= Al Lannon =

20th-century Communist Party USA leader and National Maritime Union co-founder

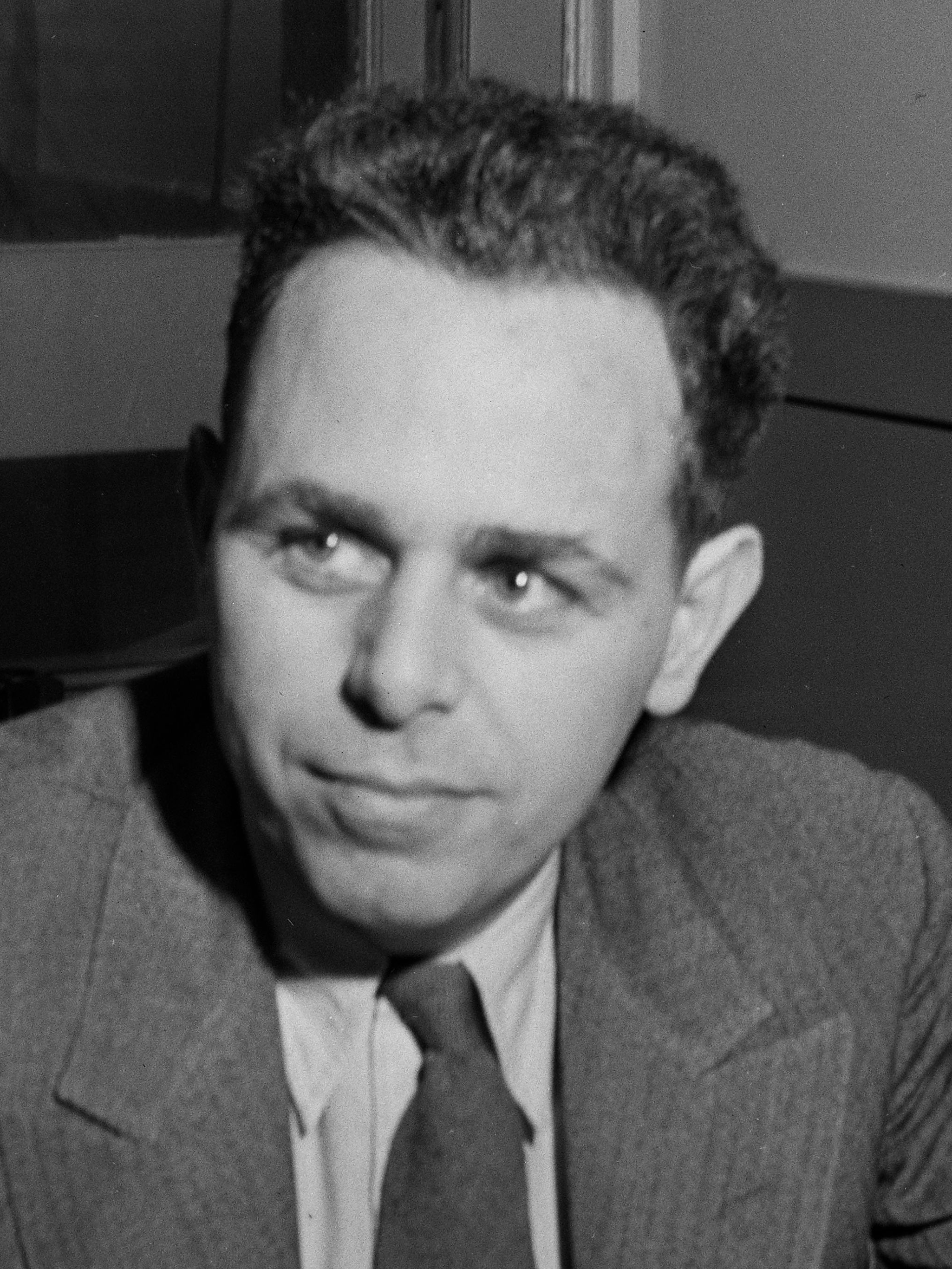
Lannon in 1943

Al Lannon (1907–1969), born Albert Vetere, was an Italian-American leader in the Communist Party USA and a co-founder of the National Maritime Union (NMU), best known for organizing and activism for American labor unions on behalf of merchant mariners and stevedores (1930–1955).

== Background ==
Albert Vetere was born in 1907 in Italy. In his teens, he ran away from home.

== Career ==
=== CPUSA ===
Lannon joined the Communist Party USA (CPUSA) and attended the International Lenin School in Moscow.

At some time during his career, Albert Vetere changed his name to Albert Francis Lannon.

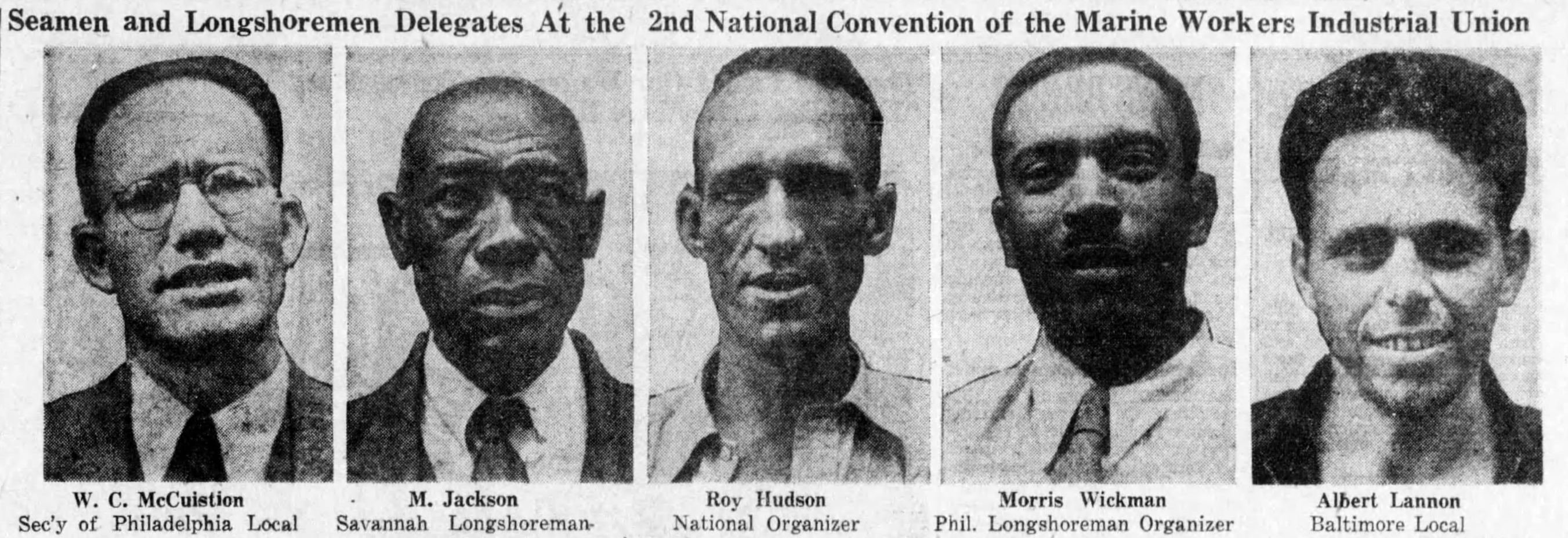
Lannon (far right) among delegates to the 2nd National Convention of the Marine Workers Industrial Union, July 1933

Lannon was an organizer for the Marine Workers Industrial Union, and Roy Hudson national MWIU secretary.

In the 1930s, Lannon worked in the waterfront sections of both the national CPUSA and for the New York State Communist Party.

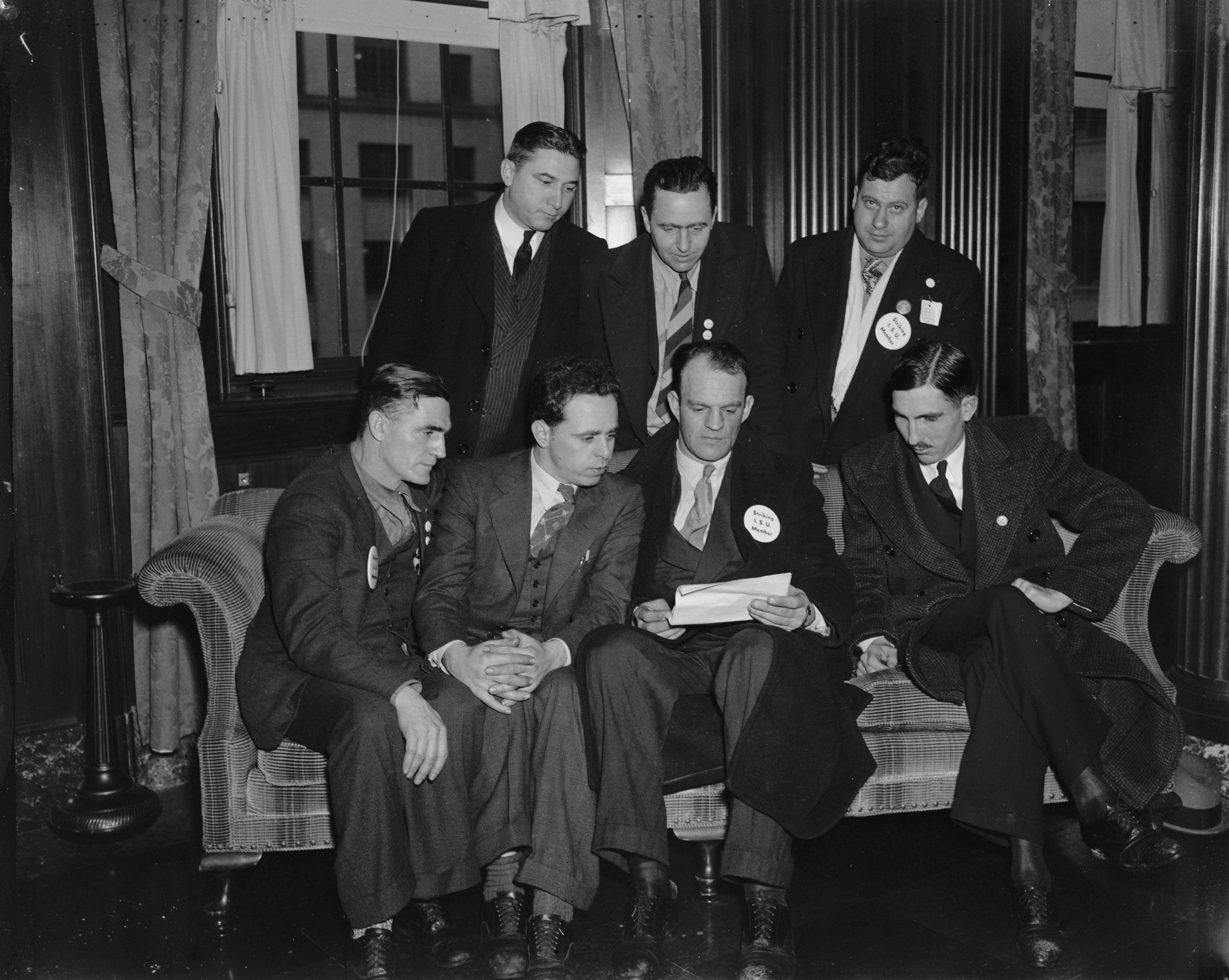
Lannon (seated, second from left) with Joseph Curran (second from right) and other striking seamen in the office of Secretary of Commerce Daniel Roper, January 18, 1937

In May 1937, Lannon became one of the founders of the National Maritime Union (NMU), representing merchant mariners on the East and Gulf coasts, and on the Great Lakes.

From 1943 to 1945 he served as district organizer of the Party's Maryland-Washington, D.C., district. During 1943, after the Tehran Conference, as Earl Browder considered reform of the CPUSA and Joseph Stalin dissolved the Comintern, Lannon advised local Maryland CP members to integrate into existing neighborhood clubs. He banned recruitment of African Americans in eastern Maryland while continuing to recruit them in western Maryland to support these policy shifts. On July 23, 1943, as District 34 Secretary, Lannon and Franklin Victor Reno met so Lannon could obtain the results of an election at Local 43 for the Bethlehem Fairfield Shipyard. On October 19, 1943, he and fellow CPUSA Roy Hudson met with Father John Francis Cronin in Baltimore to discuss the labor situation at the Bethlehem Fairfield shipyard, then the largest shipyard in America. During World War II, Lannon dispatched Corinne Shear Wood (1925-2009), at the time a shipyard worker in Baltimore, to Jacksonville, Florida to help seamen there produce their union newsletter. Lannon also recruited African-American sea captain Hugh Mulzac.

On July 21, 1947, Walter S. Steele named Lannon before the House Un-American Activities Committee (HUAC) as head of a "Coordinating Committee, National Maritime Field."

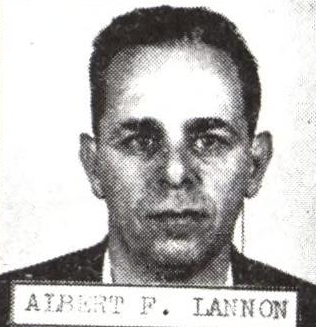
Lannon's FBI mugshot, 1951

On June 20, 1951, Lannon was among 17 second-tier CPUSA leaders arrested under the Smith Act, followed by more than 100 more party members arrested between 1951 and 1956. As CPUSA head William Z. Foster wrote in 1952:

The final conviction of the eleven top Communist Party leaders was immediately followed by further arrests: on June 20, 1951, in New York —Elizabeth Gurley Flynn, Claudia Jones, Pettis Perry, Israel Amter, Betty Gannett, Alexander Bittelman, Alexander Trachtenberg, Simon W. Gerson, V. J. Jerome, Albert Lannon, William Weinstone, Marion Bachrach, Louis Weinstock, George B. Charney, Isidore Begun, Jacob Mindel, and Arnold Johnson (four others were indicted with this group, —who did not appear in court—Fred Fine, Sid Stein, James Jackson and William Norman); on July 26th, in California-Al Richmond, P. M-Connelly, William Schneiderman, Rose Chernin, Dorothy R. Healey. H. Steinberg, E. O. Fox, R. Lambert, A. J. Lima, Oleta O'Connor Yates, Loretta S. Stack, and Bernadette Doyle; on August 8th in Maryland-Roy Wood, G. Meyers, Maurice Braverman, Philip Frankfeld, Dorothy M. Blumberg, and Regina Frankfeld; on August 17th, in Western Pennsylvania—Andrew Onda, James H. Dolsen, Benjamin Carreathers, Steve Nelson, William Albertson, and I. Weissman; on August 28th in Hawaii t W. Hall, C. K. Fugimoto, Eileen T. Fugimoto, K. Oryoshi, D. J. Freeman, J. D. Kimoto, and Dr. J. E. Reinecki; on August 31st, in California— F. Carlson, B. Dobbs, and Frank Spector. Meanwhile, Frederick V. Fields, Dashiell Hammett, Alphaeus Hunton, and Abner Green, trustees of the bail fund of the Civil Rights Congress, were thrown into jail for contempt of court because they refused to furnish names of contributors to the bail fund to federal inquisitors. In November 1951 came the trial of Dr. W. E. B. DuBois, the noted, 83-year-old scholar, Kyrle Elkin, Abbott Simon, Sylvia Soloff, and Elizabeth Moos, charged with failing to register as "foreign agents" because, in the Peace Information Center, they had circulated pledges for peace. It was so outrageous that the trial judge threw the case out of court. The F.B.I, announced that all these arrests were only the beginning, as it had 43,000 Communists under surveillance for early arrest, and also that half a million Party supporters would be thrown into concentration camps in case of war.

On July 11, 1951, FBI informant Mary Stalcup Markward named Lannon as a CPUSA leader before HUAC. Lannon went to prison in the second-string Smith Act trials in the Federal Correctional Complex, Petersburg in Petersburg, Virginia, for two years.

From 1956 to 1957, Lannon was leader of the left faction that opposed the reforms of John Gates, who had accepted Nikita Khrushchev's criticisms of Stalin and supported Howard Fast, who was quite critical of the USSR. In 1957, Lannon moved to San Francisco, California, because the FBI had killed his employment chances in New York, while the CPUSA would not help out because of Lannon's political differences. Eventually, he got a job in warehouse under ILWU Local 6.

== Personal life and death ==
In 1935, Lannon married Elva Elizabeth Lund. They had a daughter Karen and son Albert Francis Lannon Jr., also known as Albert Vetere Lannon (1938-2020), became president of ILWU Local 6 (1982-1988) and later became chair of the Labor Studies program at Laney College.

The Lannons lived in Brooklyn, the Upper West Side, East Bronx, Washington Heights, and the Lower East Side in New York City; Baltimore, Maryland; Elizabeth, New Jersey; Biloxi, Mississippi. During the late 1940s, his son later recalled:

I lived with my parents and my kid sister Karen at 212 East 12th Street, a five-story walk-up across from a paper factory. We actually lived in three apartments on the second floor that had been renovated into a single unit. To help make the rent my folks rented out a room to comrades... The first tenant I remember was Dora Lipschitz, who was deported to Poland. Next were Gerhardt and Hilde Eisler; Gerhardt was the brother of composer Hans Eisler, and reported in the press to be the Comintern’s number one spy in the U.S. Hilde was a clothes hound stuck with one small closet in the large room they occupied. I remember Gerhardt as kind, always treating Karen and me to vanilla wafers until, facing prison, he secretly stowed away on a Polish ship to make his way to East Germany and become a government official. Hilde soon followed, becoming editor of a popular magazine which had an “art” photo of a naked woman in each issue. Then came an old Russian, Boris Sklar, brother of a close comrade of Dad’s from Chicago...

== Legacy ==
In 1999, Lannon's son published a biography of his father, Second String Red.

Lannon's son gave Tamiment Library at New York University his archives about his father: 12 FBI files on Lannon, two files on his wife (also a Communist), one file on his son, an FBI report "Communist Infiltration of the Merchant Marine (1955), and a file called "Notes from Al Lannon's FBI File" from historian Harvey Klehr

Lannon was related to Frank Pinter of Baltimore.

== Works ==
During the 1940s, Lannon and Pauline Rogers served as editor of West Side Record newspaper, published by the New York State Communist Party's 3rd and 5th Assembly Districts.

Books

- The Maritime Workers and the Imperialist War (1940)
- The Communists' Message to Trade Unions (1944)
- The Mystery of 1000 "Vanished" Ships (1947)
- Let's Overthrow the Smith Act and Save the Bill of Rights (date?)
