= Roy Hudson =

20th-century Communist Party USA national executive in charge of labor

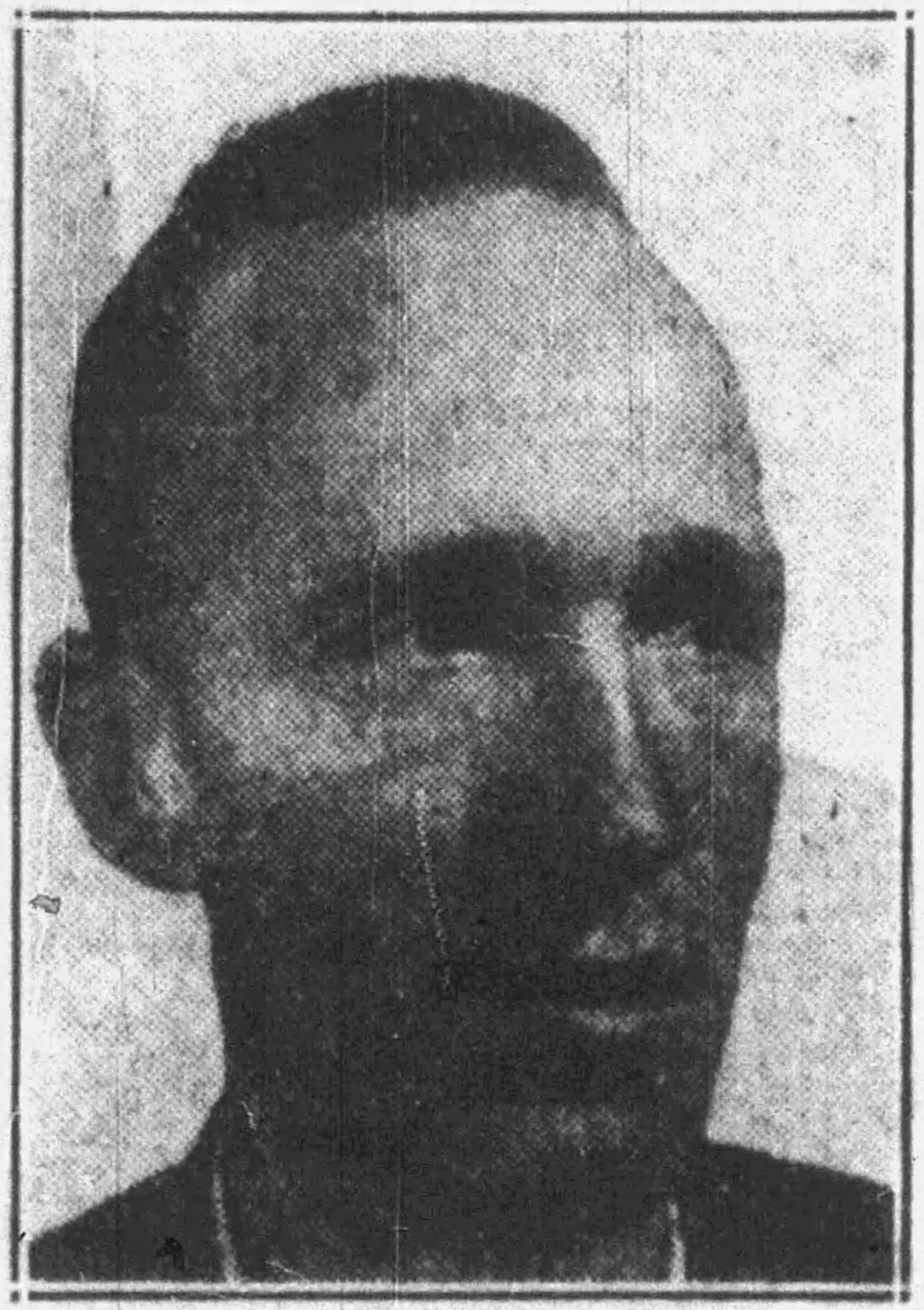
Hudson c. 1936

Roy Hudson, also known as Roy B. Hudson, served on the national executive board (also called the national committee) of the Communist Party USA and national trade union director and trade union expert.

== Career ==
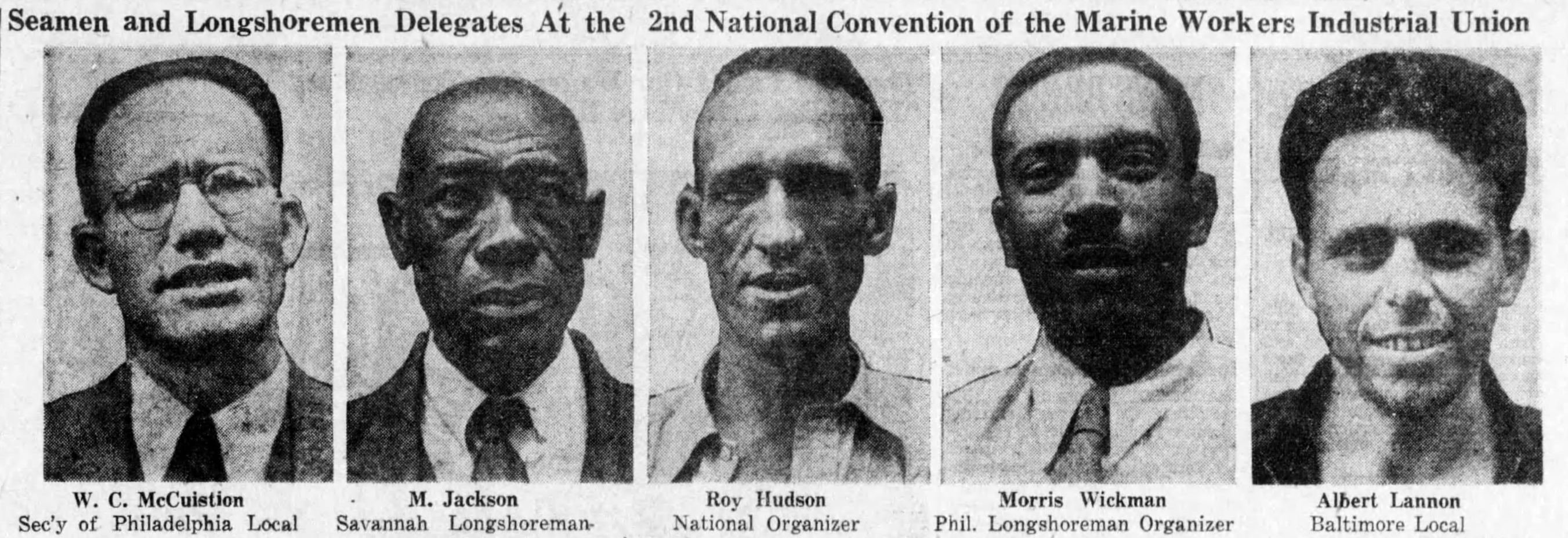
Hudson (center) among delegates to the 2nd National Convention of the Marine Workers Industrial Union, July 1933

With Al Lannon, Hudson helped found and then became national secretary of the Marine Workers Industrial Union (MWIU) at its founding in 1930. Earlier, in 1927, CPUSA member George Mink traveled to the USSR, attended the fourth congress of the Profintern, and returned to the US as the Profintern's representative of a Transport Workers International Committee for Propaganda and Agitation (TWICP&A) to organize maritime workers in the US. Working with William Z. Foster's Trade Union Educational League (TUEL). Mink established a Marine Workers Progressive League (MWPL) by 1928. During the CPUSA's factional in-fighting 1928-1929 between followers of James P. Cannon, Jay Lovestone, and Foster, Mink laid low. When Joseph Stalin appointed Foster as head of the CPUSA in 1929, Mink continued his efforts with marine workers. On April 26–27, 1930, a Marine Workers' League of New York (itself organized in 1928 by the Trade Union Unity League or "TUUL") called a convention that created the Marine Workers' Industrial Union of the USA. This national convention followed coastal conventions held during 1928–1930. The convention adopted a constitution, openly supported the USSR, and elected three delegates to attend the fifth world congress of the Red International of Labor Unions or "Profintern" (itself an arm of the Communist International or "Comintern"). The MWIU openly affiliated with TUUL. According to another source, MWIU decided against TUUL and decided instead to affiliate with the Profintern's Red International of Transport Workers via an International Seamen and Harbors Workers Union (ISH), based in Hamburg, Germany. During the 1934 West Coast waterfront strike, the International Seamen's Union and the Marine Transport Workers (MTW) of the Industrial Workers of the World (IWW) joined the strike, but the "Communist-dominated MWIU undercut the strike" by scabbing.

In June 1934, Hudson, as MWIU general secretary, toured West Coast ports. In 1935, Hudson, a ranking MWIU official, dissolved the union (then, with 14,000 members) without a vote, and the International Seamen's Union of America succeeded to it. In July 1936, Hudson spoke at the CPUSA's ninth national convention at the Manhattan Opera House on "the struggles of the seamen and the need for a maritime industrial union."

During the 1936 New York state election, Hudson ran on the CPUSA ticket for New York's at-large congressional seat. In the late 1930s, Hudson "lectured on the importance of working in trade unions" at the Los Angeles People's Education Center.

In November 1938, the Socialist Appeal characterized Hudson as the "Stalinist behind-the-scenes-men at the convention" of the United Automobile Workers of America (UAW).

In October 1939, Hudson championed the Congress of Industrial Organizations (CIO) over the American Federation of Labor (AFL) and urged US workers to keep out of the "imperialist war" (World War II), following announcement of the Hitler-Stalin Pact and the Nazi-Soviet invasion of Poland in September 1939. (In August 1941, Trotskyist David Coolidge wrote that the Hudson (a "Stalinist") had written the "party line" (i.e., the Communist Party line) for the UAW, an about-face following the 1941 Nazi invasion of Russia ("Operation Barbarossa").)

In July 1941, Hudson voiced CPUSA support for then-current UAW president R. J. Thomas and secretary George Addes.

On October 31, 1943, during a CIO convention in Philadelphia, the FBI recorded conversations of Hudson, CPUSA labor secretary. Hudson met with CIO union leaders (including Harry Bridges). On November 5, they heard identified the voice of a man whom Hudson instructed on Party demands for changes in the CIO platform: the name was Lee Pressman. Pressman's meetings continued with Hudson into September 1944.

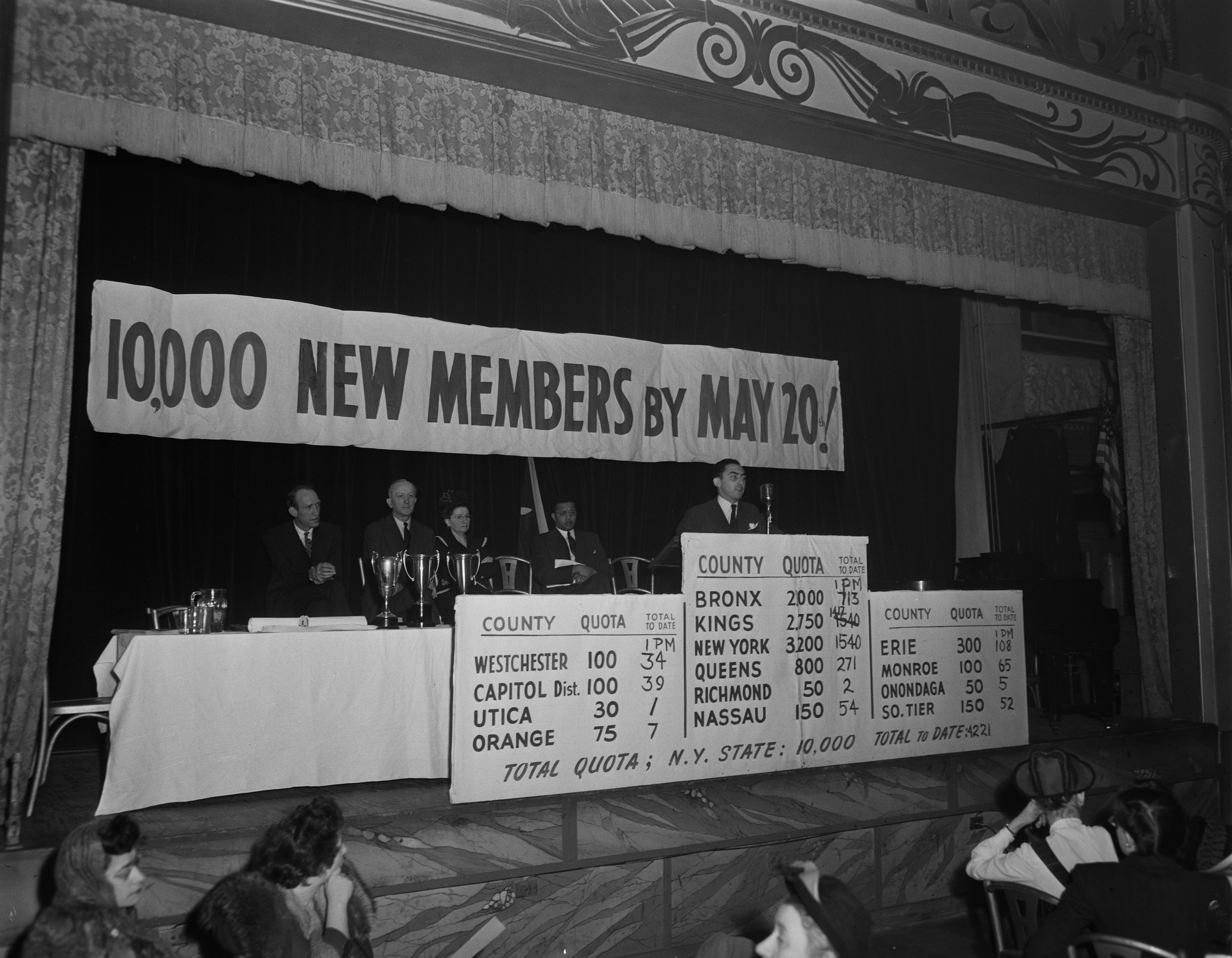
Hudson (seated, far left) at a "Party Builders Congress" at the Hotel Diplomat in New York City, April 2, 1944

In May 1944, Hudson's name appeared as a vice president among the officers of the Communist Political Association (CPA), along with Earl Browder, William Z. Foster, Robert Minor, Eugene Dennis, Elizabeth Gurley Flynn, James W. Ford, Gilbert Green, Benjamin J. Davis Jr., Morris Childs, Robert G. Thompson, William Schneiderman, John Williamson, and Charles Krumbein. On June 2, 1945, Hudson abstained from voting on the demise of the (CPA). Shortly thereafter, Hudson, who "has occupied a leading role in directing activities in various large unions" affiliated with the CIO, reversed his abstention and voted to change CPA "revolutionary" policy to adhere to "aggressive class struggle" in line with Stalinism. On June 11, Trotskyist Albert Glotzer (writing as "Albert Gates") denounced Hudson as "the party’s commissar, who enforced the Browder 'line' in the union movement." In July 1945, Hudson characterized his leadership in the CPA as follows: "I went along because, my inadequate grasp of Marxism prevented me from understanding that something was fundamentally wrong." In March 1948, ex-CPUSA publishers of The Spark published "Three Letters on Opportunism" about the fall of the CPA and quoted Hudson from a 1946 letter as writing "However, when I raise serious objections, and they are ignored or when there is no effort or when there is an inadequate effort to explain and convince, or when my motives are challenged – then I will continue to protest, although perhaps in the future, I will find a better way of doing it than abstaining from voting."

In January 1945, Hudson attacked the UAW's Walter Reuther and other "Trotskyite" leaders in their fight against a no-strike pledge.

In the 1950s, George Andersen of the San Francisco-based law firm of Gladstein, Andersen, Leonard & Sibbett represented Hudson as well as Donald Niven Wheeler, Paul Schlipf, and Paul Chown.

In 1951, Hudson's name came up during House Un-American Activities Committee (HUAC) hearings on Communist infiltration in Hollywood. Roy M. Brewer, a IATSE leader, described Irving Henschel as "lead of the Communist faction in 1944" and "member of the Rank and File Committee which attempted to set up a revolt in our organization during the 1945 strike in Hollywood." When Henschel contacted CPUSA official Max Weiss in Ohio, Weiss reported Henschel's conduct to Roy Hudson in New York.

In May 1954, during HUAC testimony, ex-Communist Elizabeth Boggs Cohen identified Hudson as "national trade union director." In July 1954, during HUAC testimony, ex-CIO press director Len De Caux refused to answer whether he was acquainted with Roy Hudson and even CIO colleague Lee Pressman.

== Personal life ==
Hudson married Edith Embrey. According to ex-Soviet spy Whittaker Chambers, Hudson's girlfriend was Andre (or Ondra) Embrey, a Hungarian-American who worked at the Bureau of Indian Affairs and whose roommate succeeded him as courier between J. Peters and Ware Group members.

In April 1934, Joseph North characterized Hudson, among other "lieutenants of revolution" as "a powerful, driving personality, steeled by years of proletarian experience and organizational activity into a dynamic leader." In 1940, North referred to him, writing "They have met men like Roy Hudson in the union halls." Hudson appears in the correspondence of fellow CPUSA member Samuel Adams Darcy. In 1972, Joseph Starobin described Hudson as "a former sailor with unimpeachable proletarian credentials."

== Works ==
Hudson wrote mostly pamphlets published by Workers Library Publishers as well as articles for the CPUSA's theoretical journal The Communist and its successor Political Affairs.

Books (Pamphlets)

- Shipowners Plot Against Spanish Democracy (1936)
- Who Are the Reds? (1937)
- True Americans: A Tribute to American Maritime Workers who Fought for World Democracy in the Trenches of Spain (1939)
- The C.I.O. Convention and National Unity (1941)
- The Growth of the Trade Unions (1941)
- Trends in the Labor Movement (1941)
- Two Questions on Winning the War (1942)
- Communists and the Trade Unions (1943)
- Shall the Communist Party Change Its Name? (1944)
- Post-war Jobs for Veterans, Negroes, Women (1944)

Articles

- "Rooting the Party on the Waterfront," The Communist (1935)
- "The Fight of the Seamen for Militant Unionism," The Communist (1936)
- "Lessons of the Maritime," The Communist (1937)
- "New Developments in Organizing the Marine Industry," The Communist (1937)
- "The Struggle for Trade Union Unity," The Communist (1938)
- "The Charter of Party Democracy," The Communist (1938)
- "Defeat the Foes of Labor Unity!" The Communist (1938)
- "The A. F. of L. Convention and Tasks for Achieving Unity" The Communist (1938)
- "The Paths of Labor's United Action," The Communist (1939)
- "For a Greater Vote and a Stronger Party!" The Communist (1940)
- "The Real Reasons for Trade Union Progress," The Communist (1941)
- "The Trend in Labor’s Ranks," The Communist (1941)
- "Browder Shows the Way Out," The Communist (1941)
- "Labor's Great Responsibilities and Possibilities," The Communist (1941)
- "Labor and the National War Effort," The Communist (1942)
- "The C.I.O. Convention," The Communist (1942)
- "The Party Recruiting Campaign in Michigan," The Communist (1943)
- "Forge World Labor Unity!" The Communist (1943)
- "Crucial Problems Before Labor Today," The Communist (1943)
- "The Auto Workers' Convention," The Communist (1943)
- "Teheran and the Wage Policy Issue," The Communist (1944)
- "Two Conventions of Labor," Political Affairs (1945)
- "Labor's Victory Wage Policies," Political Affairs (1945)
- "Speech by Roy Hudson," Political Affairs (1946)

== See also ==
- Jack Stachel
- Lee Pressman
