= Betty Gannett =

American Marxist theoretician and editor

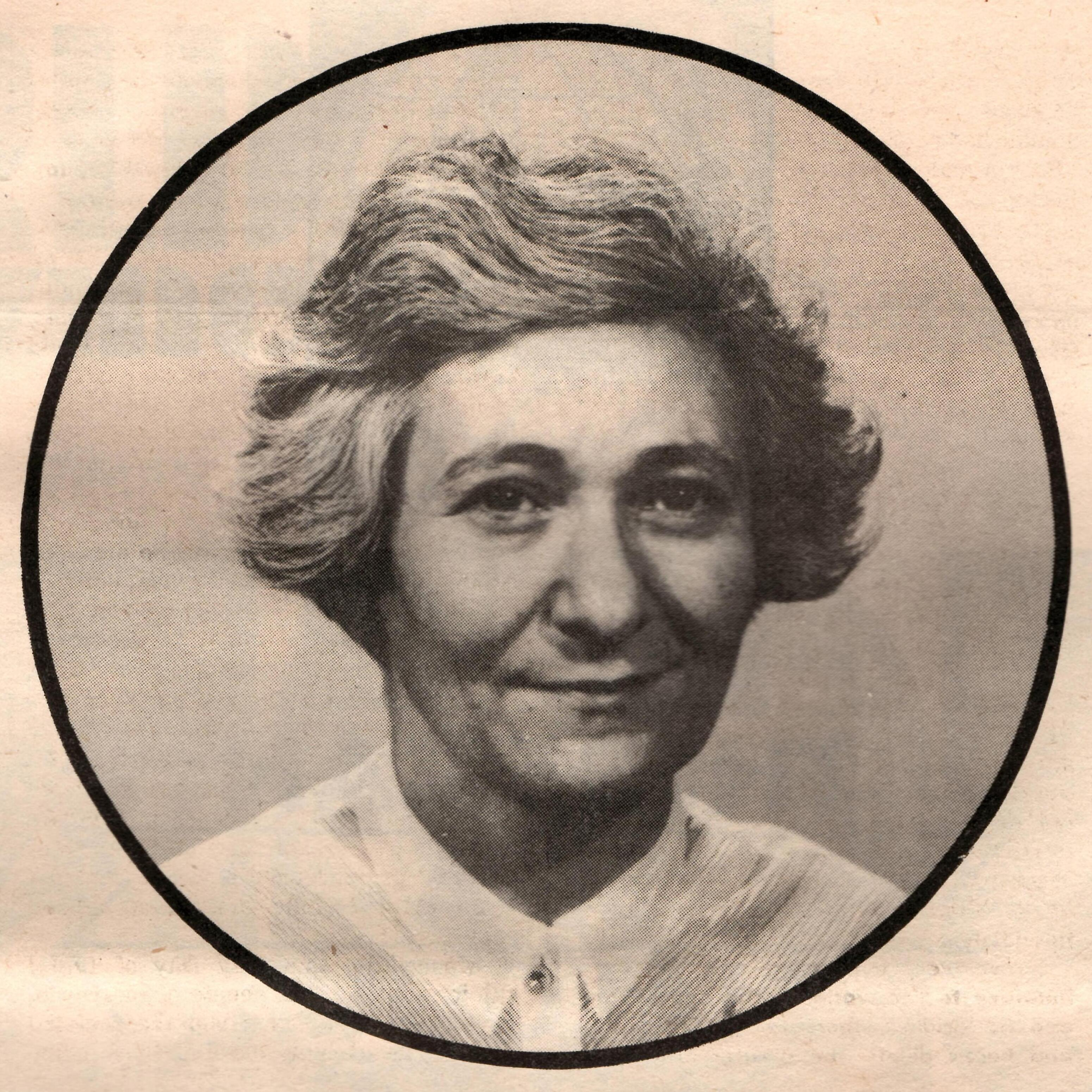
Gannett, undated

Betty Gannett (1906 – March 4, 1970) was an American Marxist theoretician and editor.

== Biography ==
She was born as Rebecca (Rifke) Yaroshefsky, in Radziwillow, in 1906 to a Jewish family in Poland. She immigrated to the United States with her family in August 1914. When she was 18, she became a member of the Young Communist League. By 1928, she was working as a district organizer for the Communist Party in Cleveland. She was arrested for the first time in 1930 and sentenced under Ohio's criminal syndicalism law, for distributing Communist literature. Her prison sentence was later overturned on appeal. She was supportive of Jacques Duclos' criticisms of the American Communist Party, saying in 1945 that they "should be grateful to him".

After the first arrests of Communist leaders under the Smith Act, Gannett and Pettis Perry were placed in charge of policy decisions for the Party. Gannett and Perry launched a campaign within the Party in 1949 to eliminate white chauvinism, a decision described by Dorothy Healey as "one of the most catastrophically stupid things we ever did".

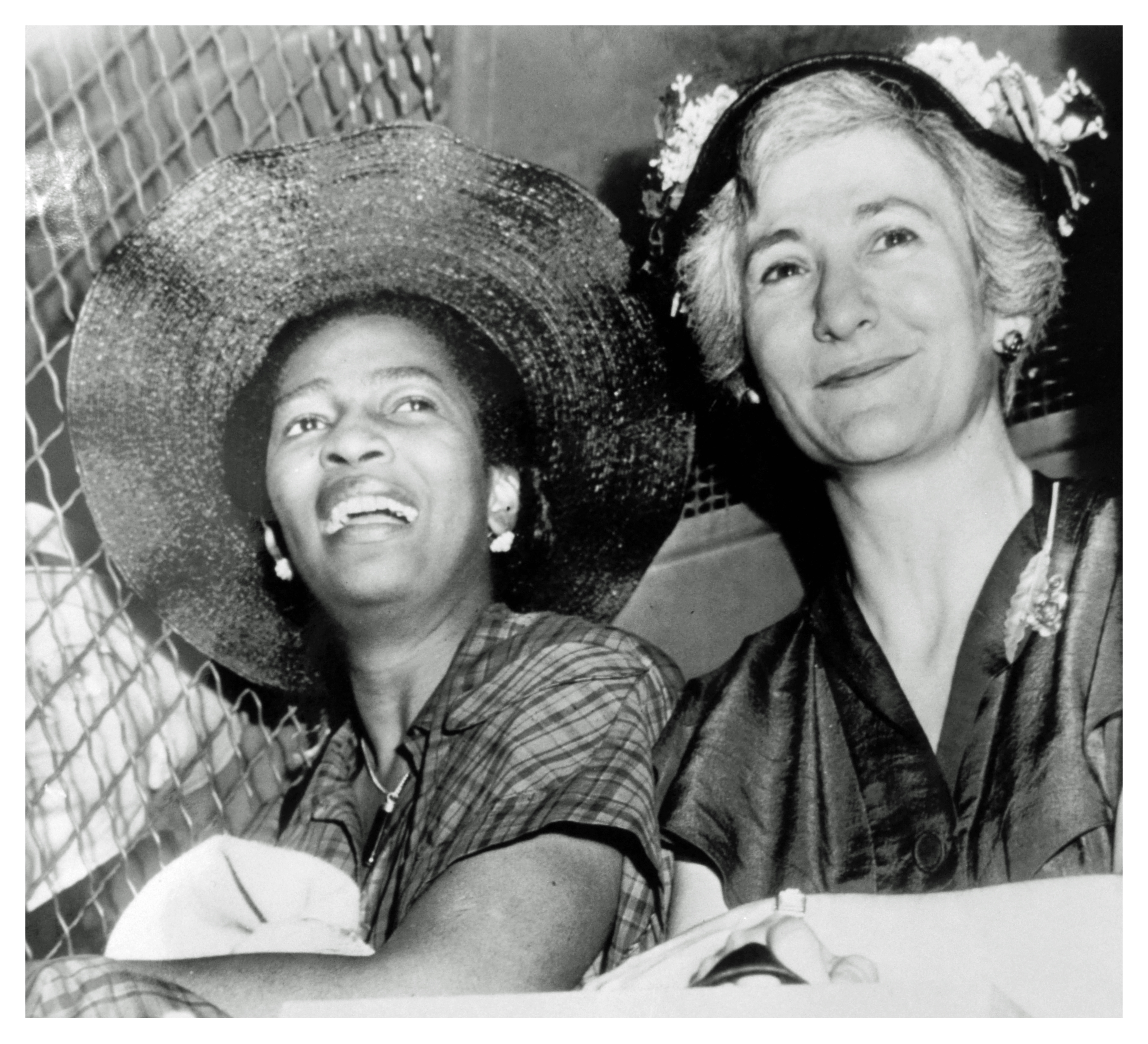
Gannett and Claudia Jones in a police wagon in New York City after their bail was revoked, July 17, 1951

At the Fifteenth National Convention of the Communist Party, in 1951, Gannett presented a report on "Ideological Tasks" for Party members, instructing the delegates to defend the "profound and pervasive democracy" in the Soviet Union against charges of dictatorship. Gannett was arrested on the morning of June 20, 1951, along with seventeen other Communist leaders under the Smith Act. She and Claudia Jones were handcuffed together and taken to the Women's House of Detention. During her trial, Gannett told the court about her childhood in Harlem and her discovery of Marxist literature in the New York Public Library. After eight months, the trial culminated with Gannett and the other defendants found guilty of advocating for the overthrow of the government. She was fined $6000 and sentenced to three years in prison. She left prison after two years, but the government unsuccessfully attempted to require her to stay within 50 miles of Times Square after her release.

In April 1953, after Stalin's death, she published a tribute to him in Political Affairs, describing him as "the beloved leader of working humanity". Despite her position in the Party, she was not elected to its National Committee at the 1957 Communist Party National Convention. She became the editor of Political Affairs in 1966.
