= Max Weiss =

Max Weiss may refer to:

- Max Weiss (chess player) (1857-1927), Austrian chess player
- Max Weiss (activist) (fl. 1920s-1940s), American activist and magazine editor
- Max Weiss (scholar) (fl. 2007-present), American scholar and translator
- Max Weiß (footballer) (born 2004), German footballer
