= George Andersen =

American lawyer (1900–1965)

- Born: George Richard Andersen; September 19, 1900; Denmark
- Died: December 29, 1965 (aged 65); San Francisco, California, U.S.
- Education: University of San Francisco
- Occupation: Lawyer
- Years active: 1930s–1960s
- Employer(s): Gladstein, Andersen, Leonard & Sibbett
- Organization(s): ILD, IJA, NLG
- Known for: Defense of Harry Bridges, ILWU

George Andersen (September 19, 1900 – December 12, 1965) was an American lawyer and partner in the San Francisco-based law firm of Gladstein, Andersen, Leonard & Sibbett. One of his clients, Harry Bridges of the International Longshore and Warehouse Union (ILWU), allegedly supported communist or pro-communist legal organizations from the 1930s to the 1960s including International Labor Defense, the International Juridical Association, and the National Lawyers Guild as well as holding stock in the communist newspaper People's World.

== Background ==
George R. Andersen was born in Denmark and immigrated with his family to San Francisco, California, U.S. He dropped out of school after sixth grade to work. Eventually, he graduated from night school classes in law at the University of San Francisco.

== Career ==
Andersen was a partner in the San Francisco law firm of the law firm of Gladstein, Andersen, Leonard & Sibbett (aka Andersen & Resner and Gladstein, Andersen, Resner & Sawyer in the 1940s), which represented the International Longshore and Warehouse Union (ILWU). Another partner Richard Gladstein defended its union leader Harry Bridges in deportation hearings three times from 1938 to 1955. In 1934, Andersen defended Ida Rothstein, an alleged communist leader of the San Francisco Bay area. In 1938, Andersen was a co-sponsor of the Schneiderman-Darcy Defense Committee, when he was serving as the attorney for the CPUSA, Carey McWilliams, and others. In 1939, Andersen defended labor rioters. In 1942, Andersen served as appellant counsel for Anita Whitney, alleged chair of the California Communist Party. In 1944, Andersen and his firm defended a "Negro" respondent on behalf of African-American workers who were members of the International Brotherhood of Boilermakers, Iron Shipbuilders and Helpers of American Union. In 1947 after the passage of the Taft-Hartley Act, Andersen and his firm advised the ILWU about how to comply with new laws. In 1948, Andersen and his law firm represented two unions in decisions made by the National Labor Relations Board (NLRB). In the 1950s, Andersen represented Roy Hudson (union liaison and executive of the CPUSA), Donald Niven Wheeler (New Deal government official and alleged Soviet spy), Paul Schlipf (legislative assistant for the California State CIO), and Paul Chown (field organizer for the United Electrical, Radio and Machine Workers of America or "UE" union). In 1954, Andersen submitted an amicus curiae in VINCENT W. HALLINAN for Disbarment of Member of State Bar of California. In 1959, Andersen served as counsel to John Dewberry in People v. Dewberry.

In January 1948, Andersen was shot by two gunmen, after he tried to stop them from robbing the office. The Federal Bureau of Investigation (FBI) closely monitored Andersen and his firm, and some speculate that the FBI was involved in this attack on his office and him.

In 1931–32, Andersen joined Carol Weiss King and others in founding the International Juridical Association (IJA), a legal bureau to help defend Communists in the USA. In 1937, when the National Lawyers Guild (NLG) was formed, he served as head of its San Francisco chapter. In 1942, he served on the IJA's national committee. In 1947, he served as local counsel in San Francisco for the American Committee for Protection of Foreign Born and was a member of its Northern California Committee for Protection of Foreign Born. In the 1950s, he was a speaker for the Civil Rights Congress (formed by a merger of International Labor Defense with the National Federation for Constitutional Liberties and the National Negro Congress).

As early as 1947, Andersen was a stockholder in People's World as well as 1949 and 1952–54.

In 1954, Andersen ran for Congress on the ticket of the Independent Progressive Party.

On April 21, 1959, Andersen served as legal counsel to Harry Bridges during a HUAC hearing. Also that year, Andersen was one of 40 lawyers who described the House Un-American Activities Committee (HUAC) report Communist Legal Subversion: The Role of the Communist Lawyer.

In 1961, HUAC alleged that Andersen was the local attorney for the Communist Party USA and noted that he had defended Archie Brown for his role in making the 45-minute documentary film Operation Abolition, which filmed the proceedings on HUAC in San Francisco on May 12–14, 1960. During the hearings, Andersen tried to disqualify the committee altogether. Also involved in the hearing was Norman Leonard, a fellow partner in Gladstein, Andersen, Leonard & Sibbett.

== Personal life and death ==
Andersen married Francis Foster (1903–2001).

The NAACP noted that Andersen's law firm was the first to hire an American-American lawyer.

George Richard Andersen died at age 65 on December 29, 1965, in San Francisco.

== Legacy ==
Andersen and his law firm Gladstein, Andersen, Leonard & Sibbett are major subjects of the 2015 book Progressive Lawyers under Siege: Moral Panic during the McCarthy Years.

== See also ==
- Harry Bridges
- International Longshore and Warehouse Union (ILWU)
- International Labor Defense
- International Juridical Association
- National Lawyers Guild
- Civil Rights Congress
