= Max Weiss (activist) =

American Communist activist and writer

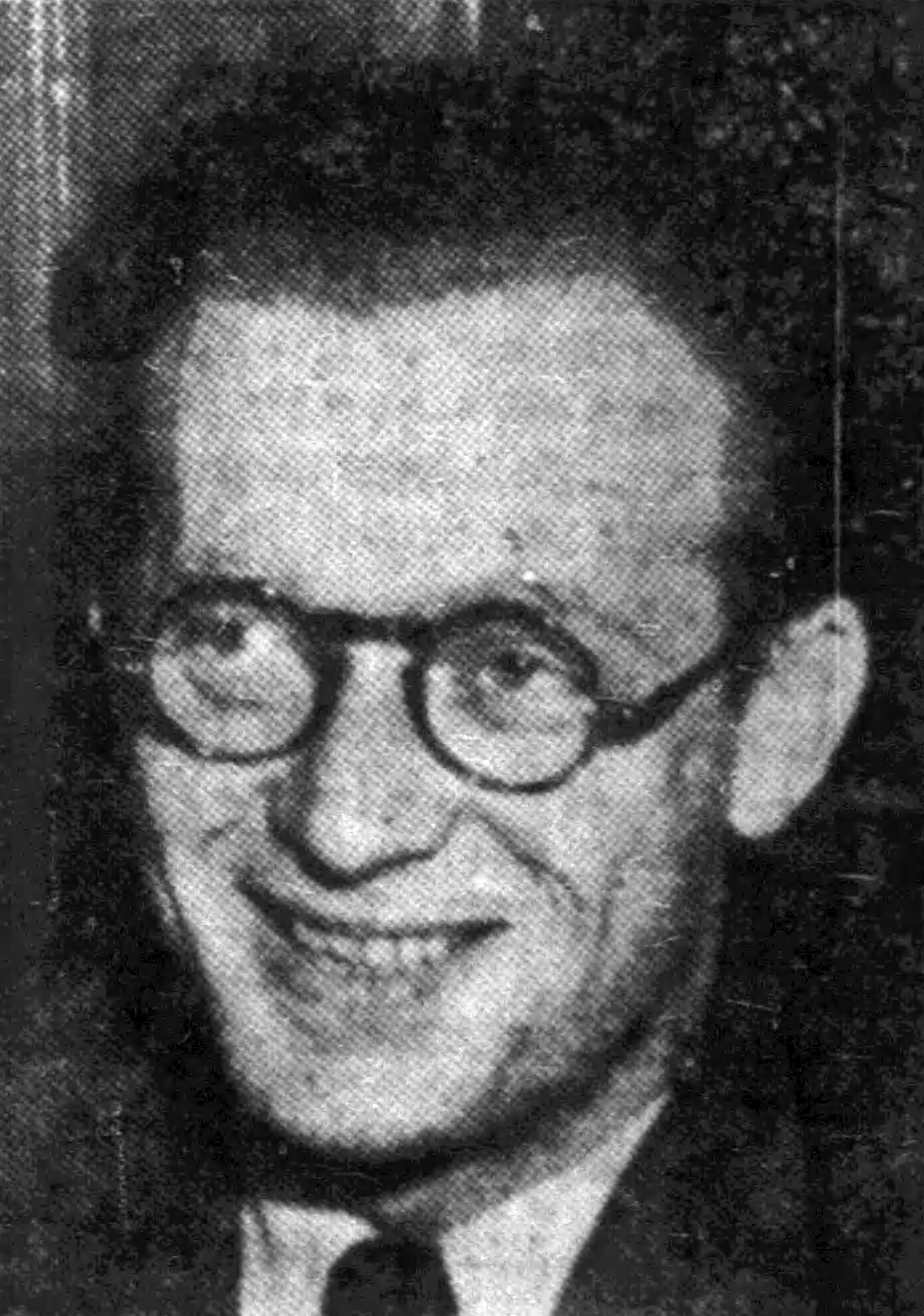
- Weiss c. 1940
- Occupations: Educational director, editor of Political Affairs
- Employer: CPUSA
- Movement: Communism

Max Weiss served as "Educational Director" and/or "Secretary of the National Education Commission" of the Communist Party USA, was a member of the Party's National Committee, edited Political Affairs, and wrote often for the Party's The Communist magazine during the 1930s and 1940s.

== Career ==
Weiss served as general secretary of the Young Communist League. In 1926, he wrote for the "Spartacist Group" of Illinois in Young Comrade: Paper for Workers' and Farmers' Children.

Weiss served as Educational Director and/or Secretary of the "National Education Commission" of the Communist Party USA and was a member of the Party's National Committee. He also edited Political Affairs.

In February 1944, Weiss's fellow members of a sub-committee of the National Committee included: William Z. Foster (chairman), Robert Minor (secretary), James W. Ford, Elizabeth Gurley Flynn, Israel Amter, Rose Wortis, Ray Hansbrough, Steve Nelson, Louis Todd, Sam Don, Alexander Trachtenberg, A. Landy, John Williamson, Mother Bloor (Ella Reeve Bloor), Anita Whitney, Charles Krumbein, Rob Hall, Pettis Perry, Alfred Wagenknecht, and V. J. Jerome.

In 1951, during HUAC hearings on Communist infiltration in Hollywood, "Max Weiss" received mention during discussion of Irving Henschel. Roy M. Brewer, a IATSE leader, described Henschel as "lead of the Communist faction in 1944" and "member of the Rank and File Committee which attempted to set up a revolt in our organization during the 1945 strike in Hollywood." When Henschel contacted CPUSA official Max Weiss in Ohio, Weiss reported Henschel's conduct to Roy Hudson in New York. The witness mentions "Weiss was at that time a Communist Party functionary in Ohio."

== Works ==
- "American Imperialism's Growing Parasitic Bureaucracy" (1932)
- "Lenin and Proletarian Internationalism" (1941)
- "Who Are the Friends of the Youth?" (1941)
- "For a National Anti-Fascist Youth Front!" (1941)
- "Earl Browder – Champion of U. S.–Soviet Collaboration" (1941)
- "On the Occasion of Dimitroff's Sixtieth Birthday" (1942)
- "Speed the Second Front" (1942) with Earl Browder, William Z. Foster, and Israel Amter
- "The Nation and the Armed Forces" (1943)
- "Youth in the Fight for Victory" (1943)
- "Fifth-Column Diversion in Detroit" (1943)
- "Toward a New Anti-Fascist Youth Organization" (1943)
- "What Price Profits?" (1947)
- "A Comment on State Capitalism" (1948)
- "The Meaning of the XXth Congress of the Communist Party of the Soviet Union" (1956)
