= Al Richmond =

20th-century American labor editor and writer

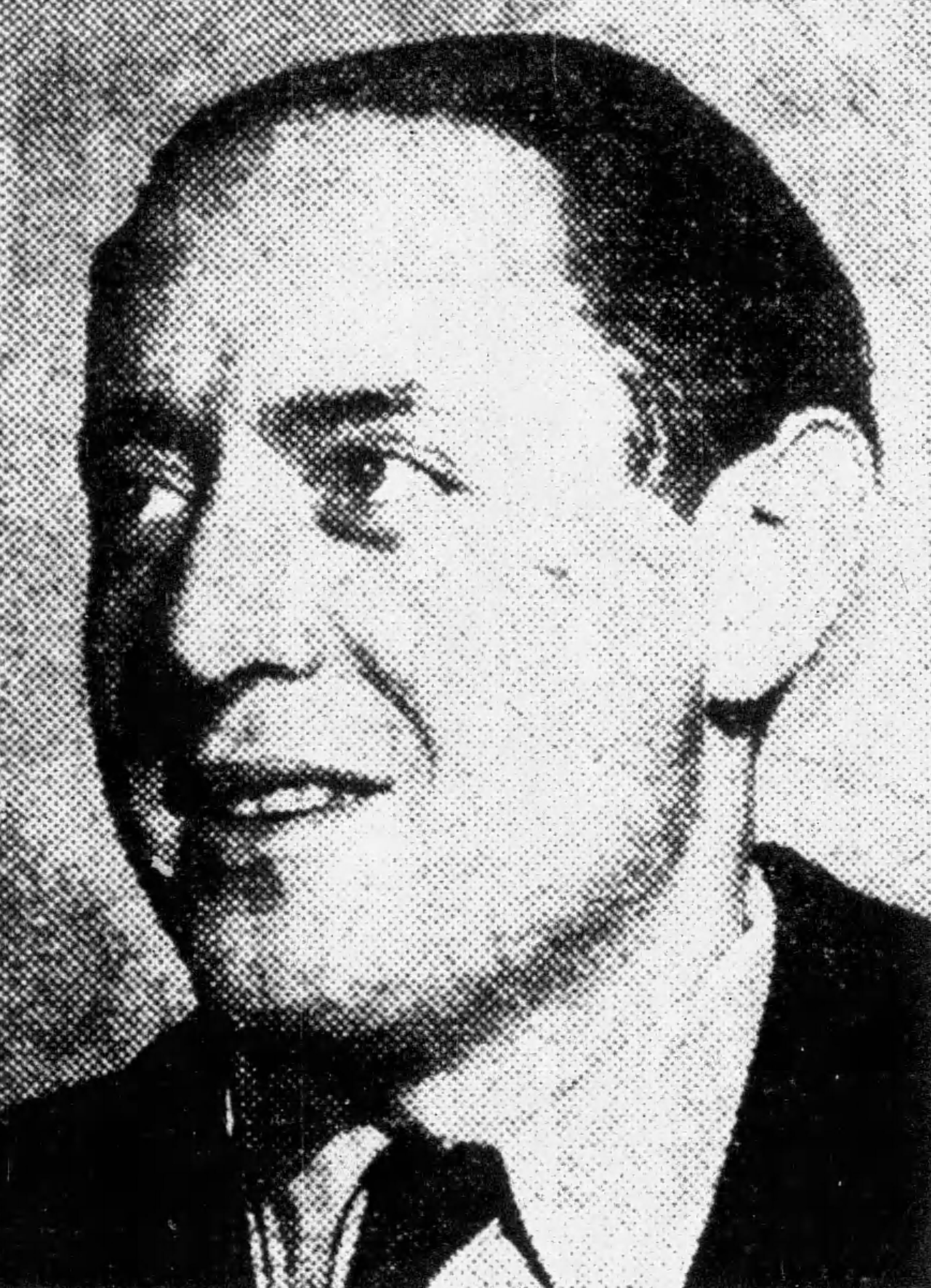
- Richmond c. 1951
- Born: November 17, 1913; London, United Kingdom
- Died: November 9, 1987 (age 73); San Francisco, California, U.S.
- Occupations: Pro-labor journalist and novelist
- Writing career
- Language: English
- Years active: 1930s-1970s
- Subject: Communism
- Notable works: People's World contributions, A Long View From the Left memoir (1973)
- Literary movement: Communist Party USA (1929–1968)

Al Richmond (November 17, 1913 – November 9, 1987) was an American writer who co-founded and served as executive editor for the People's World San Francisco.

== Background ==
Al Richmond was born on November 17, 1913, in London, England. His mother, a revolutionary left for the United States after six years in a czarist prison, returned to Russia in 1917 with her young son, to work in the cause of labor organizing. She faced arrest by German soldiers. They came back to the United States in 1922. Worked as Union Activist

== Career ==
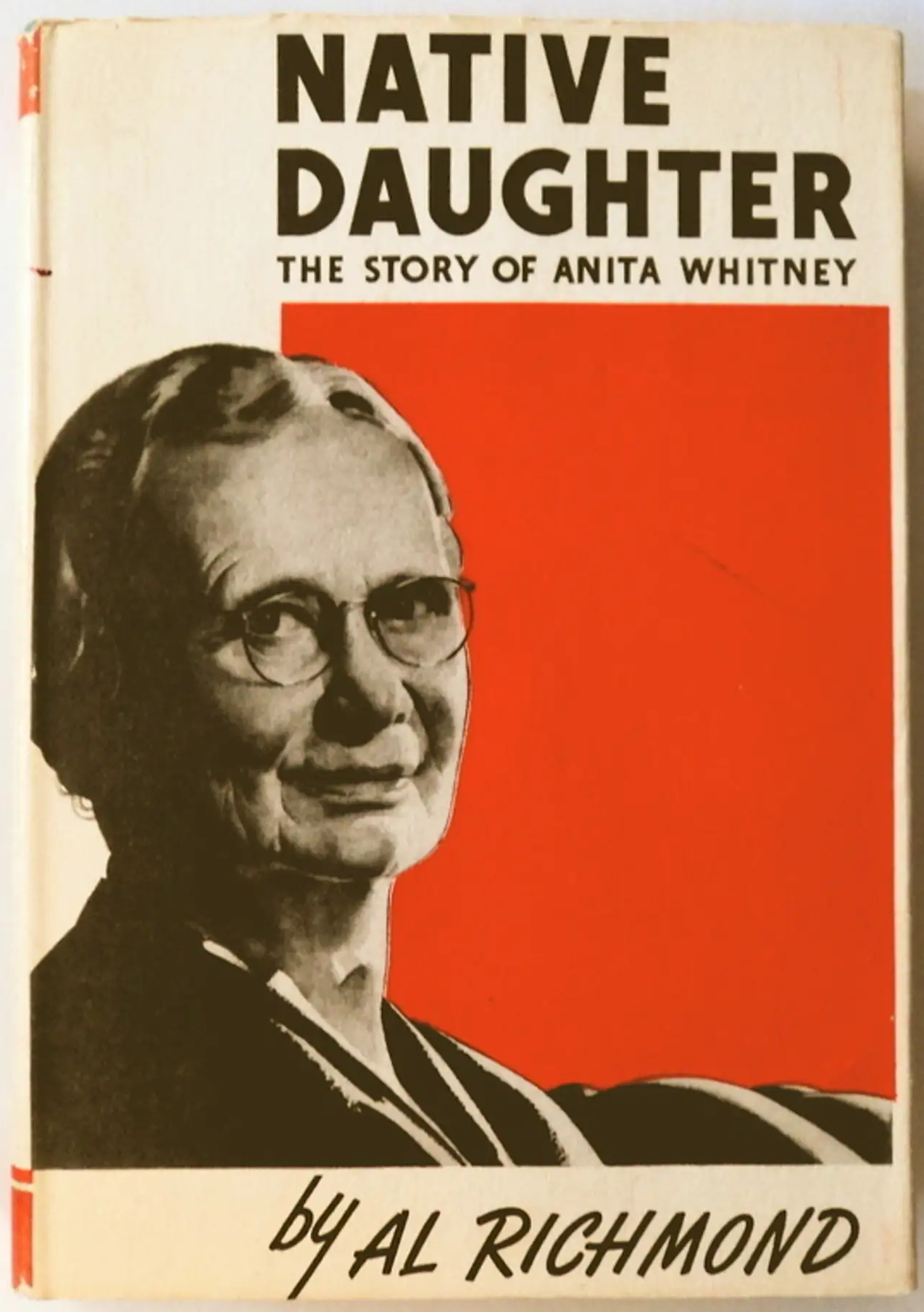
The cover of Richmond's Native Daughter: The Story of Anita Whitney (1942)

In 1929, age 15, Richmond joined the Young Communist League (YCL). After high school, he moved to Philadelphia and helped unionize factory and dock workers.

In the 1930s, he wrote for Daily Worker and then moved West to co-found what was originally the Daily People's World (now People's World) newspaper.

Richmond also edited the Sunday Worker, a weekly newspaper launched in January 1936 to try to reach more broadly than the Daily Worker, with James S. Allen as foreign editor.

After a 1951 raid by the Federal Bureau of Investigation on People's World offices, Richmond and 13 other CPUSA members in California were tried, convicted, and sentenced to five years in prison under the Smith Act for advocating violent overthrow of the US Government. Richmond served one year.

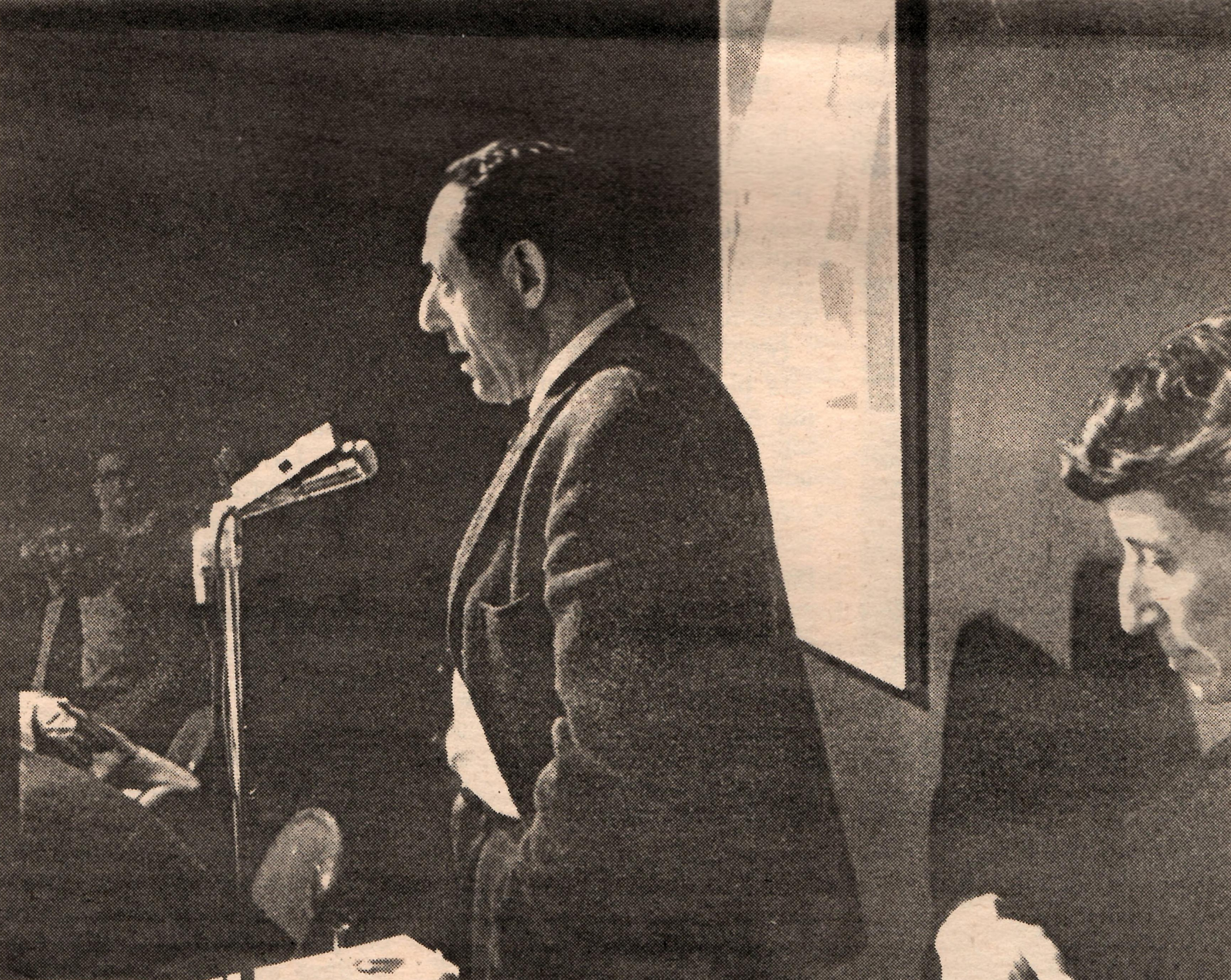
Richmond (center) at a dinner in his honor in Berkeley, California, March 7, 1970

After criticizing the USSR for invading Czechoslovakia in 1968, Richmond faced censure by CPUSA leaders and quit the Party, but remained a Marxist.

== Personal life and death ==
With wife Merle, Richmond had two children.

Al Richmond died age 73 on November 9, 1987, of pneumonia in San Francisco.

== Works ==
In his 1973 memoir A Long View From the Left, Richmond criticized the CPUSA.

- Dangerous Thoughts with Mike Quin (1940)
- A Long View From the Left (1973)
