= Marine Workers Industrial Union =

American trade union

Marine Workers Industrial Union (MWIU)
- Marine Workers' Industrial Union of the USA
- Merged: International Seamen's Union
- Founded: April 30, 1930
- Dissolved: 1935
- Headquarters: New York City
- Location: United States
- Members: 14,000
- Key people: Roy Hudson
- Affiliations: TUUL

The Marine Workers Industrial Union (MWIU) was a short-lived union (1930-1935), initiated by the Communist Party of the USA (CPUSA).

== History ==
In 1927, CPUSA member George Mink traveled to the USSR, attended the fourth congress of the Profintern, and returned to the US as the Profintern's representative of a Transport Workers International Committee for Propaganda and Agitation (TWICP&A) to organize maritime workers in the US. Working with William Z. Foster's Trade Union Educational League (TUEL), he established a Marine Workers Progressive League (MWPL) by 1928. During the CPUSA's factional in-fighting 1928-1929 between followers of James P. Cannon, Jay Lovestone, and Foster, Mink laid low. When Joseph Stalin appointed Foster as head of the CPUSA in 1929, Mink continued his efforts with marine workers.

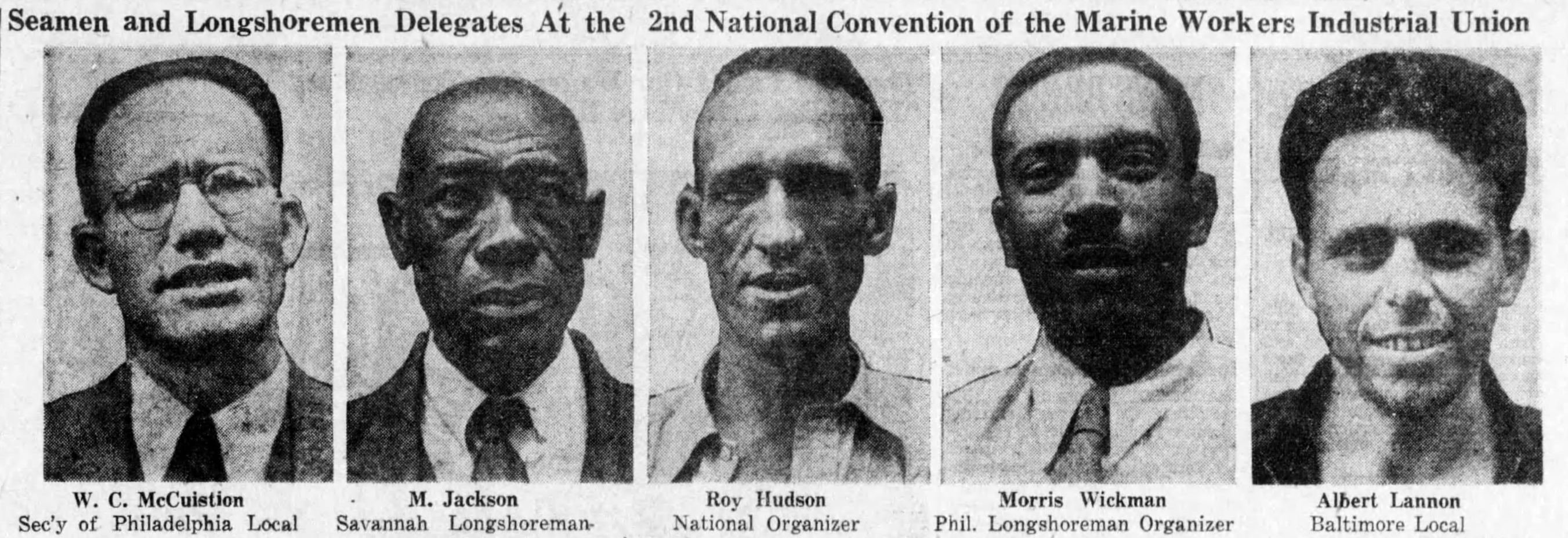
Roy Hudson (center) and Al Lannon (far right) among delegates to the 2nd National Convention of the Marine Workers Industrial Union, July 1933

On April 26–27, 1930, a Marine Workers' League of New York (itself organized in 1928 by the Trade Union Unity League or "TUUL") called a convention that created the Marine Workers' Industrial Union of the USA. This national convention followed coastal conventions held during 1928–1930. The convention adopted a constitution, openly supported the USSR, and elected three delegates to attend the fifth world congress of the Red International of Labor Unions or "Profintern" (itself an arm of the Communist International or "Comintern"). The MWIU openly affiliated with TUUL. According to another source, MWIU decided against TUUL and decided instead to affiliate with the Profintern's Red International of Transport Workers via an International Seamen and Harbors Workers Union (ISH), based in Hamburg, Germany.

During the 1934 West Coast waterfront strike, the International Seamen's Union and the Marine Transport Workers (MTW) of the Industrial Workers of the World (IWW) joined the strike.

In 1935, Roy Hudson, a ranking MWIU official, dissolved the union (then, with 14,000 members) without a vote, and the International Seamen's Union of America succeeded to it.

== Slogan ==
"Full economic, social and political equality for whites, Negroes and Asiatics!"

== Offices ==
MWIU's headquarters was at 410 Broad Street, New York City. It had US offices in Buffalo, Boston, Philadelphia, Baltimore, New Orleans, Houson, San Pedro, San Francisco, Sacramento, and Seattle. It had overseas offices in London, Newcastle, Bordeaux, Copenhagen, Antwerp, Hamburg, Bremen, Leningrad, Archangel, Vladivostok

== Members ==
- Joe Curran, future president of the National Maritime Union (NMU)
- Samuel Adams Darcy, MWIU organizer
- Roy Hudson, national MWIU secretary
- Harry Hynes, MWIU organizer who disagreed with Darcy on tactics
- Hayes Jones, later editor of the Lake, newsletter of the NMU
- Al Lannon, MWIU organizer
- George Mink, MWIU member
- Ferdinand Smith, MWIU member

== Publications ==
- Marine Workers Voice (inherited from the Marine Workers' League TUUL)

== Legacy ==
In 1963, Nelson Bruce helped found the Marine Workers Historical Association, which included records of the MWIU.

In 1980, George Morris described his recollections of the MWIU during the 1934 strike in his oral history.

Union 51 of the Industrial Workers of the World today bears almost the same name: Marine Workers Industrial Union 51.

== See also ==
- International Seamen's Union
