= Samuel Adams Darcy =

American unionist and member of the Communist Party USA

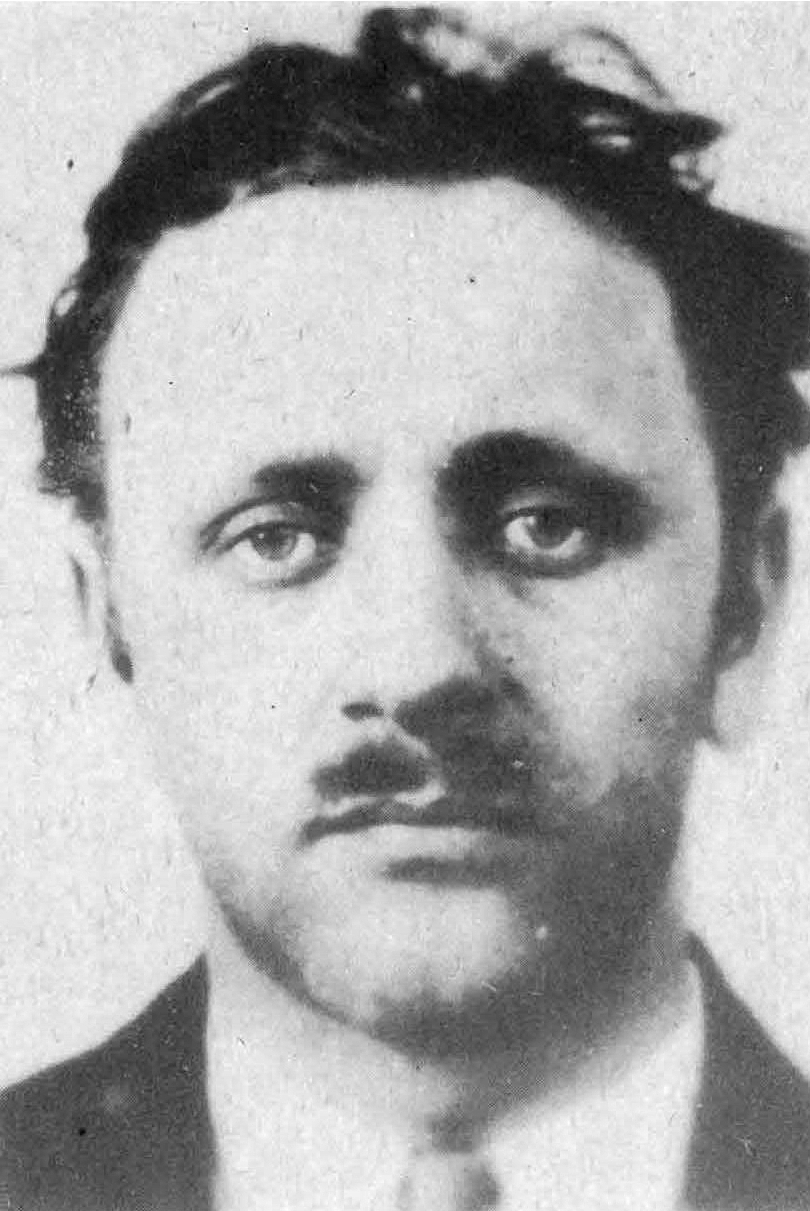
- Portland Police mugshot, 1941
- Born: Samuel Dardeck; 1905; Ukraine, Russian Empire
- Died: November 8, 2005 (aged 99–100)
- Education: New York University
- Known for: Albion Hall Group of 1934 West Coast waterfront strike with Harry Bridges
- Political party: Socialist (1917–1921); Communist (1921–1944) expelled
- Other political affiliations: Workers (1921–1929)
- Opponent: Earl Browder
- Spouse: Emma Blechschmidt (m. 1926)
- Parents: Isidor Dardeck (father); Fagella Weissbly (mother)

Signature
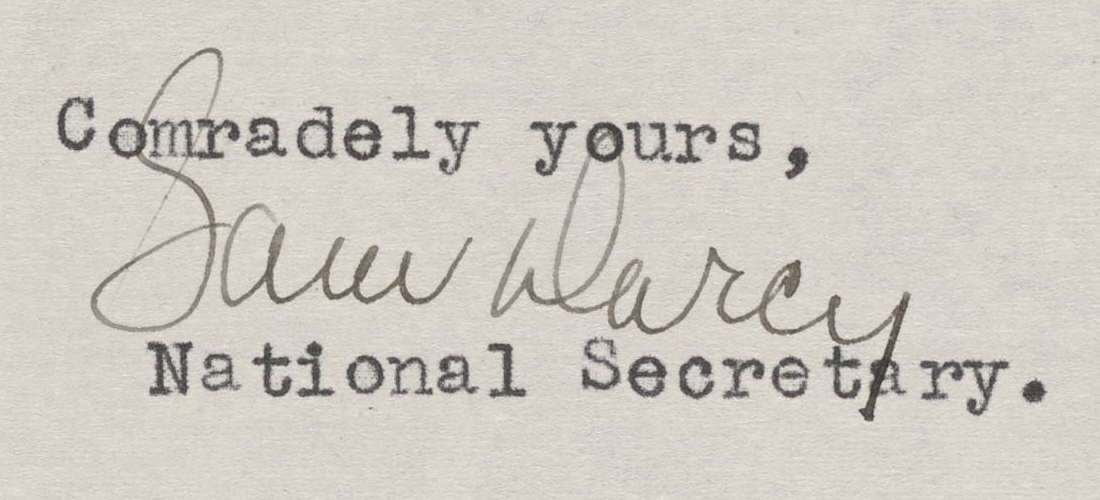

Samuel Adams Darcy (born Samuel Dardeck; 1905 – November 8, 2005) was an American political activist who was a prominent Communist leader in New York and California. He was active in the organization of New York City's unemployment march in 1930, as well as the 1934 West Coast waterfront strike. He was a supporter of Harry Bridges.

== Background ==
"Samuel Adams Darcy" was born Samuel Dardeck in the Russian Empire in 1905, the son of Ukrainian Jews Fagella Weissbly and Isidor Dardeck. In 1908 he and his family immigrated to New York. He spent his early years growing up in New York City, attending DeWitt Clinton High School in Midtown, and eventually New York University. At an early age Darcy witnessed his father, an ardent union member, severely beaten by police at a garment workers picket line. According to Darcy that was a defining moment in the development of his own political beliefs. During a 1998 radio interview, he recalled:

My father was a worker in American factories until his 79th year. He was a member of the International Ladies' Garment Workers' Union, and I was about ten years old when he started taking me to union meetings. He was in Local 35. It ignited an interest in American workers' welfare that has stayed for me to this day, in fact... We tried to organize child laborers. When I was twelve and a half years old, I worked for the O'Sullivan Rubber Heel Company in Lower Manhattan about 1917 ... From my previous couple of years in my father's union, I became interested in organizing young child laborers, who were employed illegally, against laws which prohibited children [from] working in factories below the age of sixteen. We organized something called the Young Workers League. In the YWL, we looked around for help, working out a program for improvement ... I read the findings of Darwin ... and the Communist Manifesto.

== Career ==
=== Communist years ===
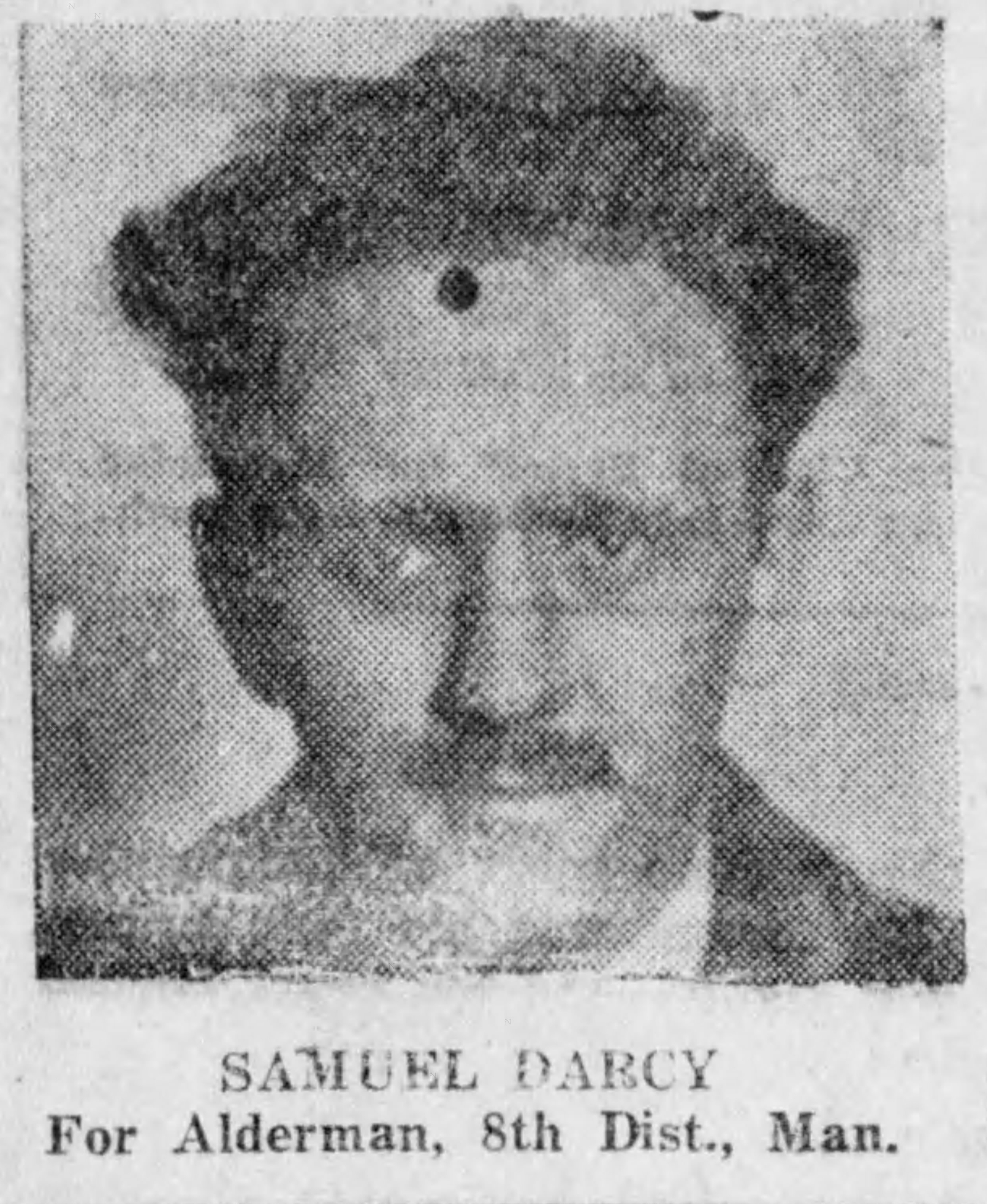
Darcy as a candidate for the New York City Board of Aldermen, 1929

In 1917, while still in high school, Darcy joined the Young People's Socialist League. In December 1921, following the Russian Revolution, Darcy joined the Communist Party USA (CPUSA—then the Workers Party of America), using his affinity for public speaking and organizing to rise in the organization's ranks.

In 1927, the Party sent a 22-year-old Darcy to Moscow. He taught American History at the Lenin School. During 1927–1928, he joined the Communist International, where he served on the executive committee of the Young Communist International (YCI), served as chair of International Children's Committee of the YCI, and traveled to China and Philippines to organize working-class movements.

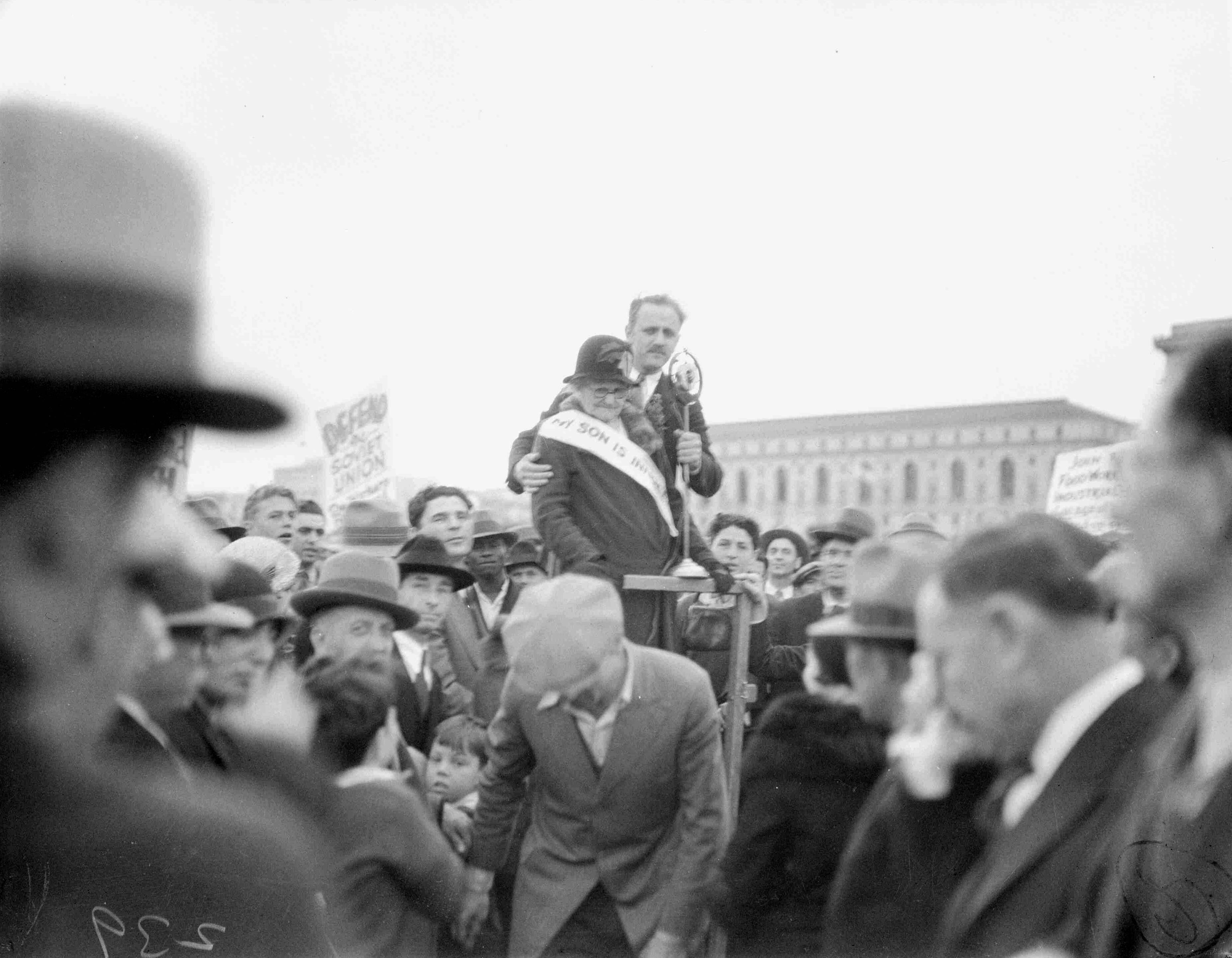
Darcy and Mary "Mother Mooney" at a May Day rally in the San Francisco Embarcadero, 1932

Darcy returned to the United States in 1929 and quickly rose to prominence within the CPUSA. When Earl Browder emerged from the Party's fighting among American factions (followers of Jay Lovestone, James P. Cannon, and William Z. Foster) in the late 1920s, Browder moved Darcy over as editor of the Daily Worker – according to Darcy, Browder hoped responsibilities at the Daily Worker would consume him and take him out of Party politics. Darcy also headed the New York Workers School (following the departure of Jay Lovestone from the Party and of Bertram Wolfe and other co-founders from the school). In 1930, he also became the head of the Party's International Labor Defense group, which (Darcy later claimed) helped make him de facto chairman of the CPUSA.

==== 1930: March 6 Protest ====
Darcy was one of the main organizers of the New York unemployment march, which took place on March 6, 1930 as part of International Unemployment Day.

Even with the massive turnout, however, internal criticism arose that the CPUSA did not reap the benefits by failing to sufficiently increase their membership. Party General Secretary Earl Browder made Darcy a scapegoat for these perceived failures by "exiling" him to San Francisco, far from the CPUSA national headquarters to a multi-state district where Party affairs were in shambles. While many in the Party anticipated Darcy would fade into oblivion, the shifting political climate put more organizing emphasis on the West Coast, essentially giving Darcy the platform he needed to do some of his most famous and influential work.

==== 1934: San Francisco Waterfront Strike ====
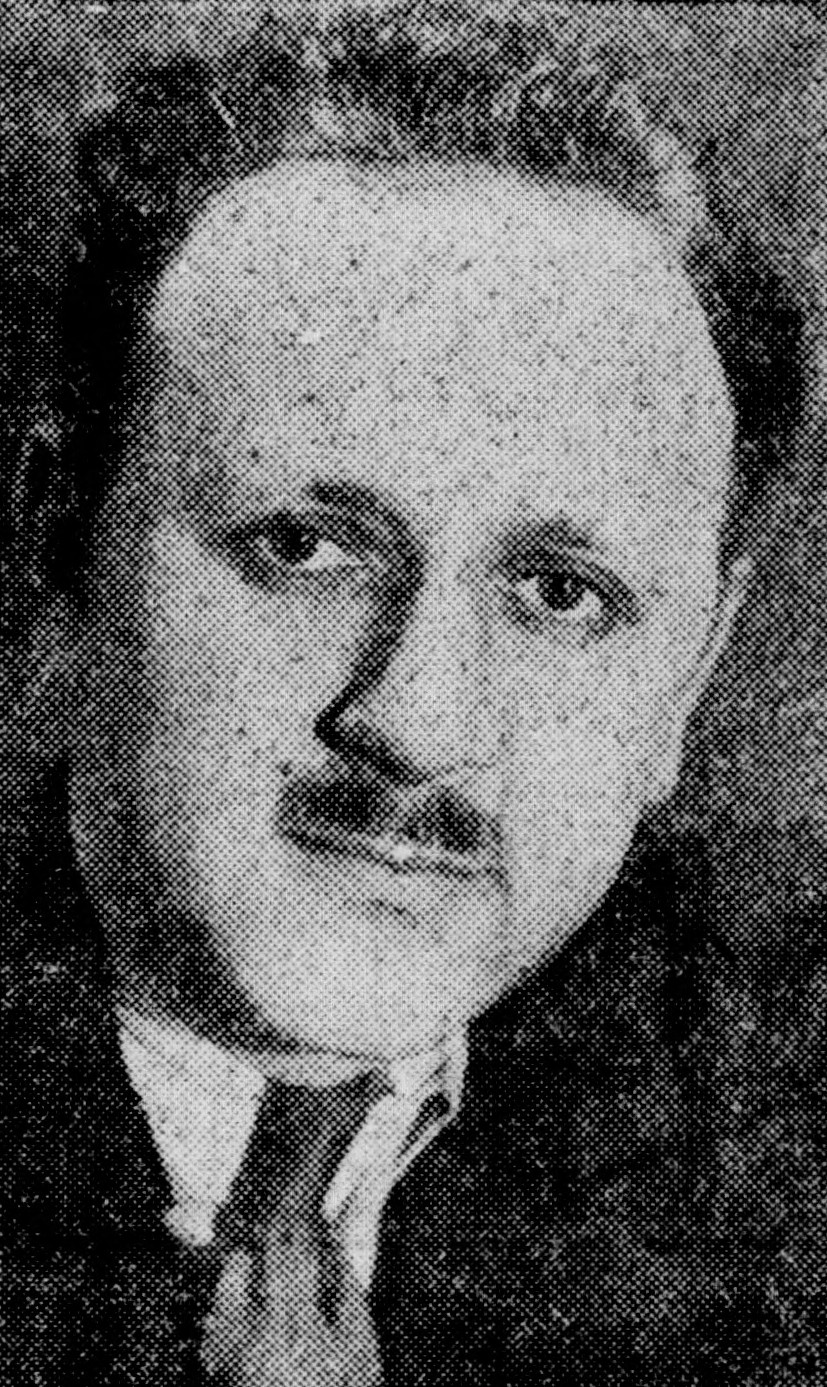
Darcy c. 1934

From 1931 to 1935, Darcy headed the CPUSA's California district (including Nevada and Arizona), then the Party's second largest district. He helped organize agricultural workers and helped fight California's criminal syndicalism law.

Darcy became involved with strategies to organize San Francisco longshoremen. In the early 1930s the Communist Party had pursued the strategy of infiltrating existing unions to elect rank and file workers to take control from what the CPUSA thought of as corrupt and conservative union officials. The CPUSA attempted to organize a separate union, the Marine Workers Industrial Union (MWIU). Darcy and the MWIU organizer, Harry Hynes, disagreed on tactics, and eventually Hynes was recalled from San Francisco. Once the International Longshoremen's Association (ILA) granted a charter to San Francisco, Darcy came to see the MWIU as an impediment to organizing longshoremen.

Darcy was supportive of Henry Schmidt and Harry Bridges who formed the Albion Hall Group as a caucus within the new ILA local. While supporters of the MWIU condemned Darcy and his "boring from within" approach, evidence suggests that the strategy was both beneficial for the Communist Party and the militants within the ILA. On the eve of the 1934 West Coast waterfront strike, ILA national President Joseph P. Ryan and Senator Robert F. Wagner, Chairman of the National Labor Board, urged the Longshoremen not to strike. The ILA Pacific Coast District leaders, who were not influenced by Darcy, ignored their requests. On May 9, 1934, some 14,000 Longshoremen went on strike throughout the West Coast.

In 1934, Darcy (who had once headed the New York Workers School) helped establish the San Francisco Workers' School (later the California Labor School), where he also served as both advisor and instructor.

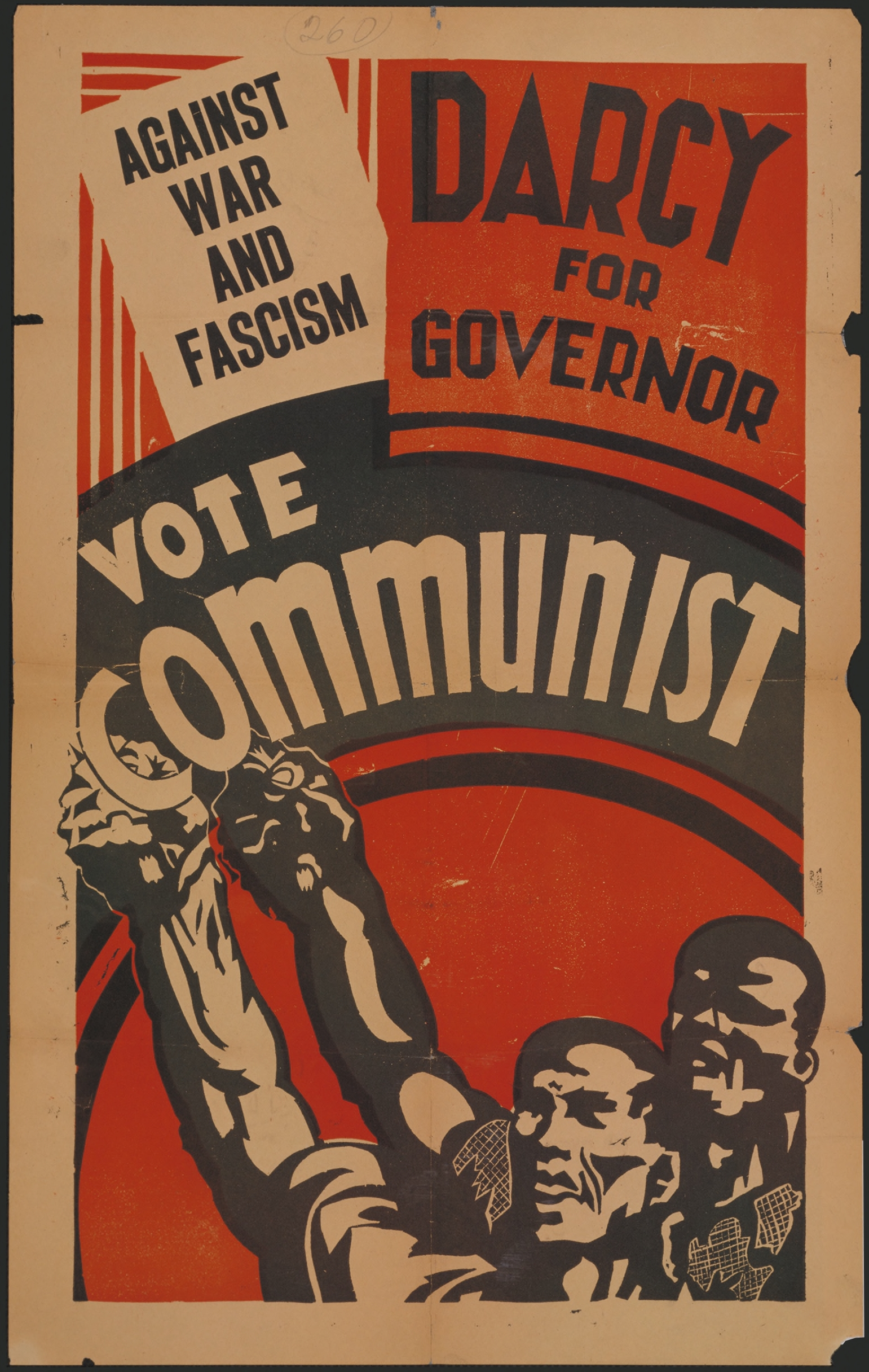
"Darcy for Governor" campaign poster, 1934

Also in 1934, Darcy argued within the Party's central committee to unite in a common front with Upton Sinclair's "End Poverty in California" (EPIC) movement. The Party refused and instead directed Darcy to run for governor of California as the Party's candidate. His wishes would later be realized with the foundation of the United Labor Party in the 1935 San Francisco mayoral election.

==== Further Party years ====
From 1935 to 1938, he traveled to Moscow, where he took part in the 7th congress Communist International then became the US party's representative on the Anglo-American Secretariat.

In 1938, he became the Party's National Education Director as well as committee representative for the Party's Minnesota-Wisconsin-Dakotas district.

In 1938–39, the Party demoted him from full Central Committee member to alternate.

From 1939 to 1944, he served as head of Eastern Pennsylvania, the Party's fourth largest district. Involved heavily in electoral work, he supported Party efforts to defeat the 1943 Democratic nominee for mayor of Philadelphia, William Christian Bullitt Jr. (Bullitt had been Roosevelt's first ambassador to the USSR, 1933–1936, by the end of which time he had become anti-communist.)

==== People vs. Darcy ====
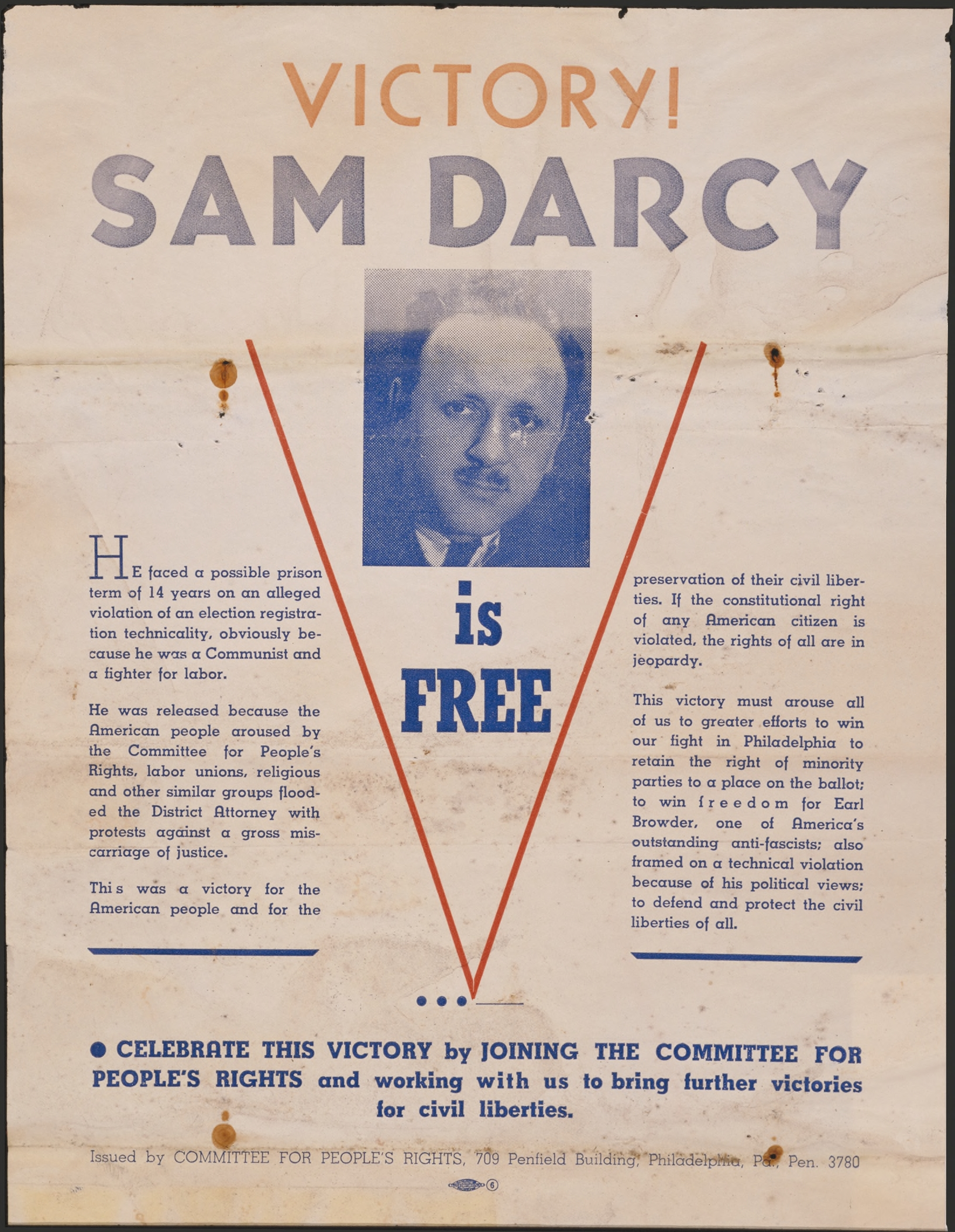
Poster issued by the "Committee for People's Rights" celebrating Darcy's release, 1941

In September 1940, Darcy was indicted on charges of perjury for (allegedly) having misstated his name and birthplace when registering to vote in California back in 1934. He spent six weeks in jail and was released in September 1941.

==== Party expulsion ====
In 1944, Darcy and William Z. Foster openly opposed Earl Browder's "estimation of the prospects for post-war American-Soviet harmony." Foster backed down, but Darcy escalated his protest by resigning from Party offices. Shortly thereafter, CPUSA leadership expelled Darcy.

=== Rest of life ===
In 1945, the Party removed Browder from leadership, but Darcy did not rejoin.

Later, he sold furniture. He partook in Democratic Party and labor issues until his death.

During a 1998 radio interview, Darcy characterized Earl Browder as the root of problems in the CPUSA in the 1930s: "Browder was really a corrupt man. Everything evil in Communism, he championed."

== Personal and death ==
Darcy was acquainted with many important non-communist progressives, including Lincoln Steffens, Yip Harburg, and Otto Nathan (of the estate of Albert Einstein). He also remained in touch with several ex-communists such as William Dunne and Charles Keith.

In 1926, Darcy married Emma Blechschmidt.

He died on November 8, 2005.

== Legacy ==
The Sam Darcy Papers at Tamiment Library show principal correspondents as: William F. Dunne, William Z. Foster, Israel Amter, Roger Baldwin, Max Bedacht, Cedric Belfrage, Earl Browder, Eugene Dennis, Leo Gallagher, Yip Harburg, Roy Hudson, Robert Minor, Tom Mooney, Otto Nathan, Scott Nearing, Mike Quin, Nat Ross, William Schneiderman, Jack Stachel, Lincoln Steffens, Peter Steffens, and Ella Winter.

His papers also include many Daily Worker cartoons by Jacob Burck (Furiers' Strike, Gastonia Strike, Organizing Workers, Peace) and a portrait of his friend William Z. Foster.

== Works ==
- Sam Darcy Archive at marxists.org

Books:

- Late Afternoon for the Nation State
- Thomas Jefferson: The Second Revolution
- The Challenge of Youth
- The Battle for Production

Articles:

- "New Documents on the Bolshevik Revolution," New Masses (1935)

Unpublished: The Sam Darcy Papers contain three unpublished works:

- The Storm Must Be Ridden (ca 1945)
- Tales of Three Worlds (ca 1960–63)
- The Second Revolution (play) (1974)
