= Mike Quin =

Pen name of American Communist writer (1906–1947)

- Quin in 1941
- Born: Paul William Ryan; July 1906; San Francisco, California, U.S.
- Died: August 14, 1947 (aged 41); San Francisco, California, U.S.
- Occupations: Pro-labor journalist and novelist
- Writing career
- Pen name: Mike Quin, Robert Finnegan
- Language: English
- Years active: 1930s–1940s
- Subject: Communism
- Notable works: New Masses and People's World contributions, The Big Strike (1949)

"Mike Quin" (July 1906 – August 14, 1947) was the pen name of the American Communist writer Paul Ryan, who also used a second pen name, "Robert Finnegan". He is best known for his posthumously published book The Big Strike (1949) about the 1934 West Coast waterfront strike.

== Background ==
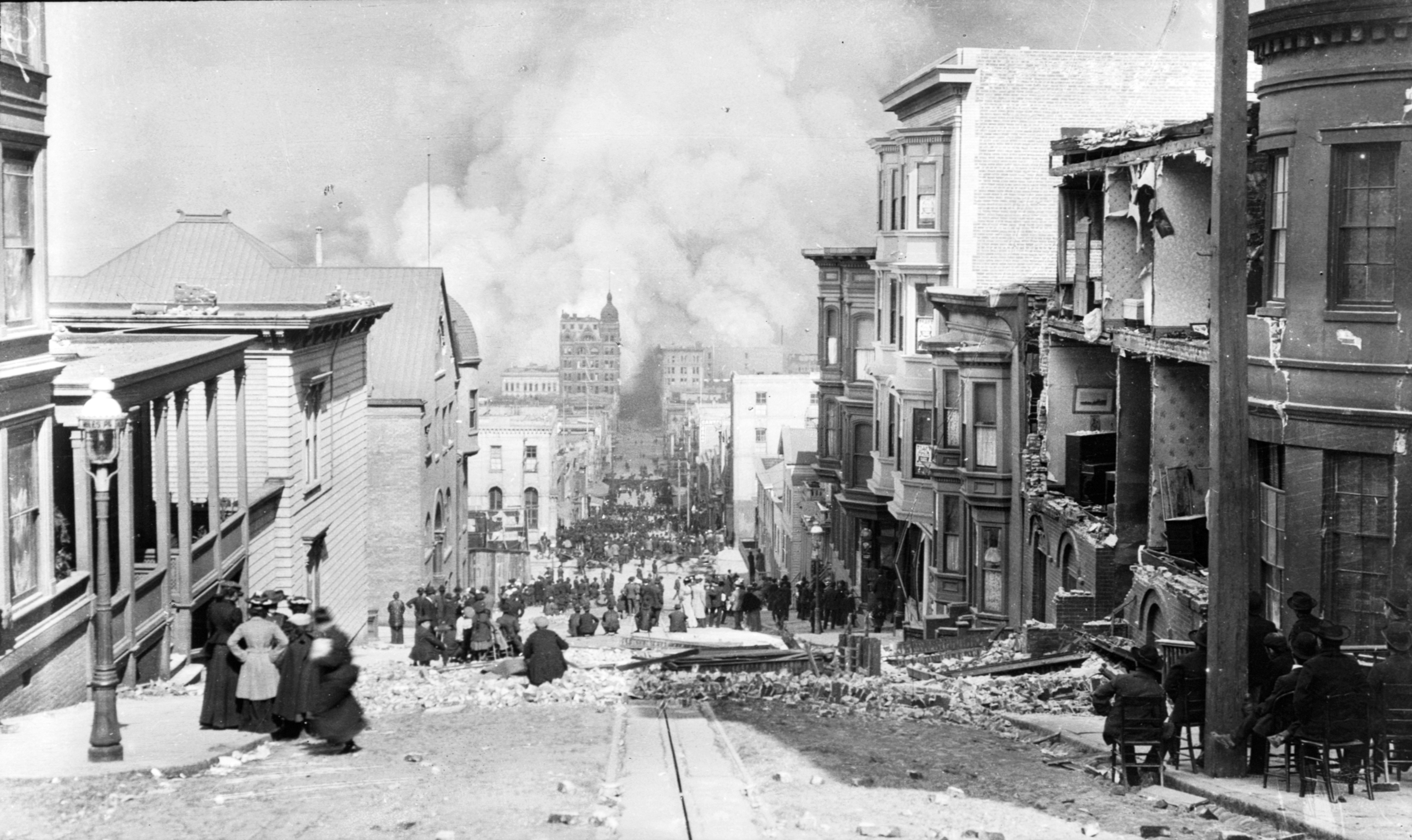
Scene from San Francisco earthquake of April 18, 1906, shortly after which Quin was born

Mike Quin was born Paul William Ryan in 1906 in the Mission District of San Francisco, California, shortly after the 1906 earthquake. His mother was an Irish-Jewish-French dressmaker. His father was an Irish-American traveling salesman "who drifted out of the family orbit" when Paul and his younger brother and sister were still children. Paul attended Pacific Heights Grammar School and Polytechnic High School. With his family struggling to make ends meet, he left school at age 15 to begin earning money.

== Career ==
Paul Ryan took various jobs until age 19, when he became a seaman and first got involved in maritime unions. In the late 1920s, he obtained a job in a Hollywood bookstore, which was frequented by local writers. One of the writers was a Marxist who helped radicalize Ryan, who then joined the John Reed Club chapter in Hollywood.

In 1933, Ryan began his lifelong pursuit of a writing career by having a short story, "The Sacred Thing", published in Scribner's Magazine. He also started contributing to the John Reed Club's Partisan magazine, as well as to New Masses and the Western Worker (predecessor of People's Daily World). It was at this time that "Mike Quin" was born. Under that pseudonym, he published a 1933 pamphlet, "And We Are Millions: The Story of Homeless Youth", a collection of testimonies from unemployed, Depression era youths convicted of vagrancy by the American justice system. The pattern he established was to use "Mike Quin" for his journalistic pieces, newspaper columns, and political essays. Then, late in life, he chose "Robert Finnegan" as his pen name for mysteries and pulp fiction.

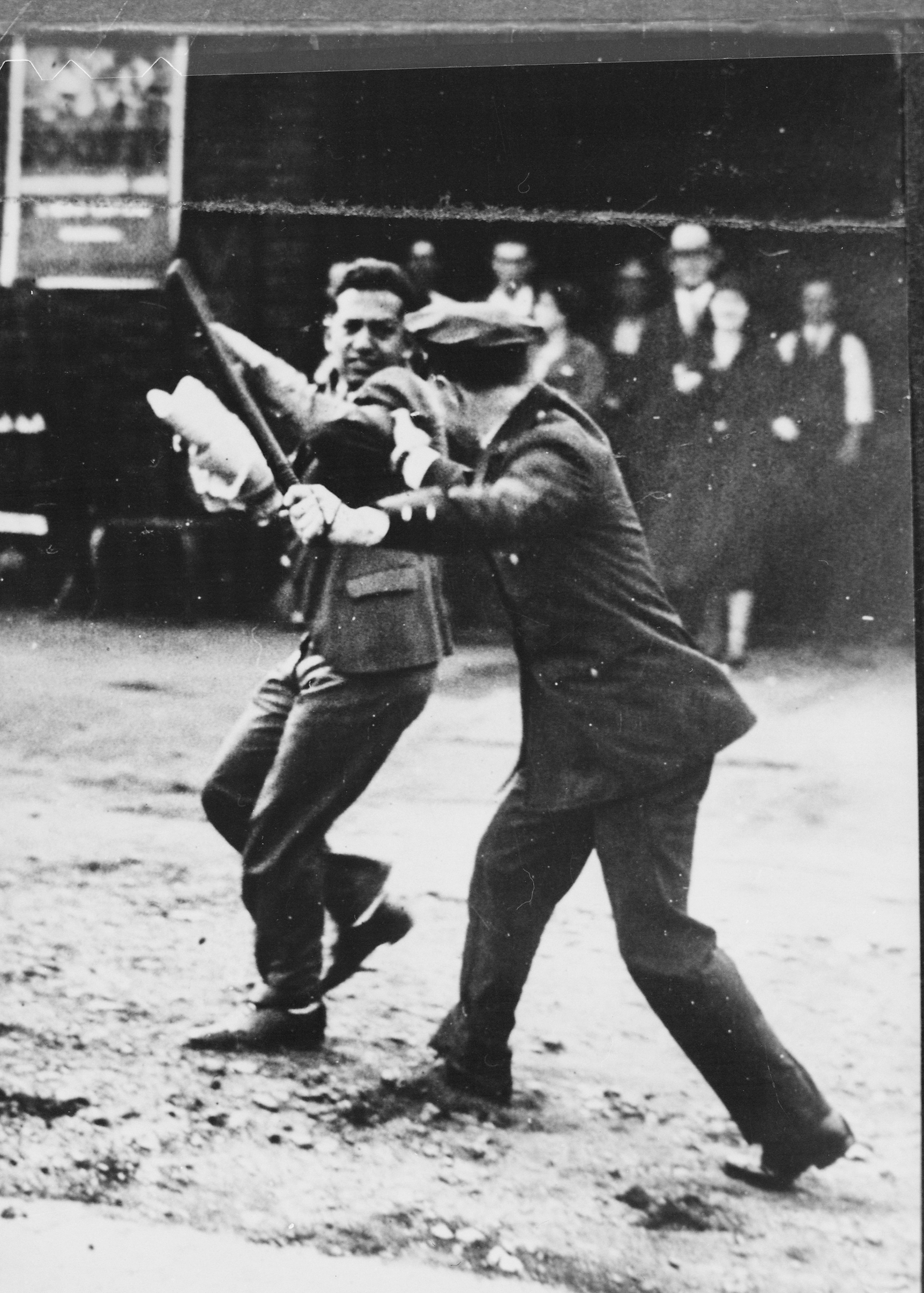
Scene from the 1934 West Coast waterfront strike, about which Quin reported and later wrote a book

Quin wrote extensively about the 1934 West Coast waterfront strike for publications such as the Dispatcher of the International Longshore and Warehouse Union (ILWU). In 1936–1937, he worked for the WPA Writers' Project, where he wrote about the history of the maritime and cotton-growing industries. In 1938, he helped launch People's Daily World (later People's World). It was the West Coast daily newspaper of the Communist Party USA (CPUSA). He served as executive editor and columnist for the paper, and remained with it for the rest of his life.

In 1940, Quin was a founding member of "The Yanks Are Not Coming" committee, which was established as a pro-neutrality group within the Maritime Federation of the Pacific. The committee's primary activity was dissemination of pamphlets urging labor union members to avoid the rising tide of "war fever". At the time, it was also the position of the CPUSA (in the wake of the Molotov–Ribbentrop Pact) for the U.S. to stay out of the European theater of World War II. Quin's pamphlet "The Yanks Are Not Coming!" (1940) "reached an enormous audience, attracting such nationwide attention that Walter Winchell referred to the author as one of America's most dangerous men." The pro-neutrality committee largely ceased to operate after the Nazi invasion of the Soviet Union in June 1941, and the December 1941 attack on Pearl Harbor.

Quin's first published anthology, Dangerous Thoughts (1940), received a congratulatory letter from Theodore Dreiser, who wrote an introduction to the follow-up anthology, More Dangerous Thoughts (1941). Also in 1941, People's World published a collection of Quin's "The Enemy Within" serials. That August, he visited New York City and was interviewed by the Daily Worker, to which he contributed poems as early as 1938 and articles as early as 1940. In 1943, the CIO hired him as a scriptwriter for a radio show entitled Facts to Fight Fascism. From 1943 to 1945, the CIO made Quin their "CIO Reporter on the Air". One of his final assignments for the CIO was to cover the United Nations Conference on International Organization, which was held in San Francisco from 25 April–26 June 1945. In the autumn of 1945, he prepared a series of radio broadcasts for the National Maritime Union, and one also for the Marine Cooks and Stewards Union.

At the conclusion of WWII, Quin's job with the CIO ended. To earn money, he tried his hand at mystery writing under the pen name "Robert Finnegan". He achieved success with three novels: The Lying Ladies (1946), The Bandaged Nude (1946), and Many a Monster (published posthumously in 1948). As Alan Wald notes, "All concern Dan Banion, an ex-soldier turned newspaper reporter who is frequently at odds with the police in his investigations." The novels, written in the noir genre, depict the post-war atmosphere. They were translated into French and attracted a following among fans of hard-boiled detective fiction.

Quin remained active in the CPUSA until his death. A comprehensive collection of his political writings, On the Drumhead, was published posthumously in 1948.

== Personal life and death ==
After an unsuccessful first marriage to a woman named Rose, Quin married Mary King O'Donnell in 1945. They had a daughter, Colin Michaela, in July 1946.

Following several months of undiagnosed illness and fatigue, Quin received the grim news in early spring 1947 that he had pancreatic cancer with only two months to live. This occurred just before he moved with Mary and Colin to Olema, California.

Mike Quin died on August 14, 1947, and was buried in San Francisco. A memorial service, presided over by Harry Bridges of the ILWU, attracted over 500 mourners.

== Works ==
Quin wrote "The Yanks Are Not Coming" originally as a pamphlet for the 1940 CIO annual conference in San Francisco. His posthumous book The Big Strike (1949) was a compilation of his journalistic work covering the 1934 West Coast waterfront strike.

Contributions to the New Masses

- "Modern Heroes: William Green and Matthew Woll" Poem (1936)
- "Did You Ever See a Dream Fighting?" (1941)
- "A Letter About Sam Darcy" (1941)
- "Investigation: A Poem"

Contributions to People's Daily World

- "Seeing Red" with song satirizing Henry Ford to the tune of "Yankee Doodle" (1938)
- "Seeing Red" with workers correspondence (1938)
- "Seeing Red" on economic slump (1938)
- "Seeing Red" on United Office and Professional Workers of America CIO (1938)
- "Seeing Red" on anti-communist journalism (1938)
- "Seeing Red" on International Longshore and Warehouse Union as example of trade union unity (1938)
- "Seeing Red" on agriculture in China and the USA (1938)
- "Seeing Red" on Jim Crow (1938)
- "Seeing Red" on mimeograph publications (1938)
- "Seeing Red" on the WPA's Federal Arts Committee and art for labor (1938)
- "Seeing Red" on free speech for labor unions on radio (1938)
- "Double Check" on benefits of unionizing (1938)
- "Double Check" on Maxwell Anderson's play Valley Forge (1938)
- "Double Check" on benefits of Big Business (1938)
- "Double Check" on Americans journeying to fight in the Lincoln Battalion during the Spanish Civil War (1938)
- "Double Check" on Americans now fighting in the Lincoln Battalion during the Spanish Civil War (1938)

Books as "Mike Quin"

- The C.S. Case Against Labor: The Story of the Sacramento Criminal Syndicalism Railroading (1935)
- Ashcan the M-Plan: The Yanks Are NOT Coming (1940)
- Dangerous Thoughts (1940)
- The Enemy Within (1941)
- More Dangerous Thoughts (1941)
- On the Drumhead: A Selection from the Writing of Mike Quin; A Memorial Volume (1948)
- The Big Strike (1949)

Books and Stories as "Robert Finnegan"

- The Lying Ladies (1946)
- The Bandaged Nude (1946)
- "Business Before Bullets" (1947)
- Many a Monster (1948)

Short Stories as Paul Ryan

- "The Sacred Thing" (1933)

== External sources ==
- The Big Strike (PDF)
