= George Blake Charney =

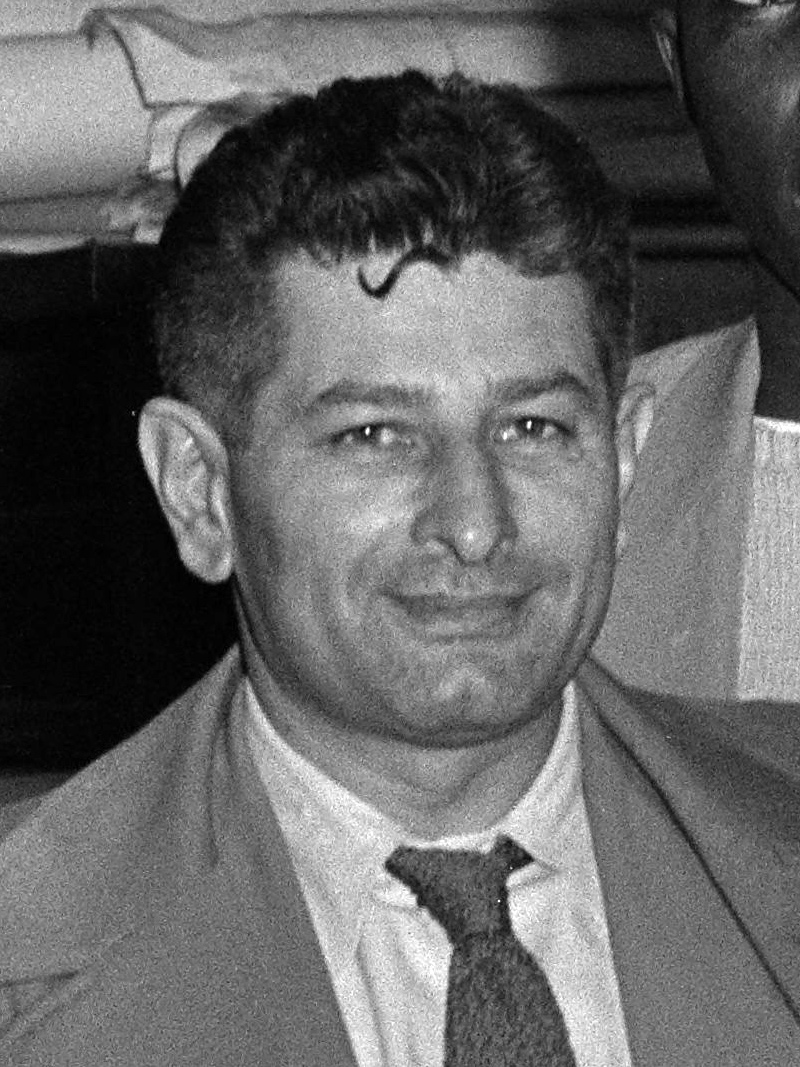
Charney in 1949

George Blake Charney (September 12, 1905 – December 13, 1975) was a Ukrainian-American lawyer and politician who served as chairman of the New York County Communist Party in the late 1940s. He was later prosecuted under the Smith Act.

== Biography ==
Charney was born in Yekaterinoslav (then a part of the Yekaterinoslav Governorate in the Russian Empire) on September 12, 1905, into a Jewish family. According to his autobiography, his family background was "petit-bourgeois", which caused some distrust among other Party leaders with working-class origins. Charney became a naturalized citizen in 1916, graduating from the Wharton School in 1927 and Harvard College in 1928. He received a law degree from New York University, was admitted to the bar in 1932, and joined the Communist Party in 1933. Charney later recalled that he had joined the Party in the 1930s because it was "positive and forward looking". In 1935 he abandoned a legal career to work as the organizational secretary of the Party in New England, then an organizer in Harlem from 1937 to 1940 and Queens thereafter. In the 1930s, Charney embraced Earl Browder's leadership of the Communist Party, and his attempts to work with liberal groups.

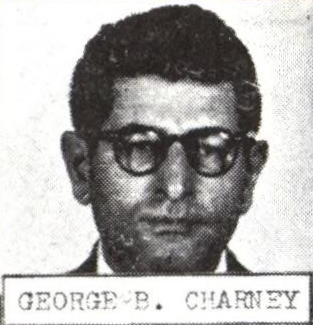
Charney's FBI mugshot, 1951

During World War II, Charney served in the 130th Infantry Regiment of the 33rd Infantry Division of the U.S. Army, enlisting in March 1942 and rising to the rank of technical sergeant by August 1945. He fought in the New Guinea, Western New Guinea and Philippines campaigns, helping to organize supply efforts during the battles of Morotai and Leyte. For this work he received the Bronze Star in February 1945. After finishing his military service, Charney was made chairman of the New York County Communist Party, serving until 1950, when he became labor secretary for the state party. Charney was one of 17 Communist Party leaders arrested in 1951 and 13 arrested in 1954 and accused under the Smith Act of advocating for the overthrowing of the government. Following his arrest, Charney approached Socialist Party leader Norman Thomas for assistance and Thomas enlisted the ACLU on his behalf. Edward C. Dimock determined that Harvey Matusow had committed perjury when he claimed that Charney supported overthrowing the government. Charney was found guilty in September 1956 and sentenced to two years in prison. The convictions of Charney and five other Smith Act defendants were overturned by the U.S. Court of Appeals in 1958.

Charney was profoundly affected by the 1956 revelations of Stalin's purges. Khrushchev's Secret Speech "destroyed forever our blind faith in dogma, creed, ideology, vanguard, and all the gods." By 1957, Charney was part of a group advocating for the reform of the Communist Party to make it more democratic. Charney supported John Gates's position that the Party should declare independence from the Soviet Union. In 1969, Charney published the memoir A Long Journey, covering his time in the Communist Party. He died of a heart attack in West Palm Beach, Florida on December 13, 1975.
