= Rudy Lambert =

American communist

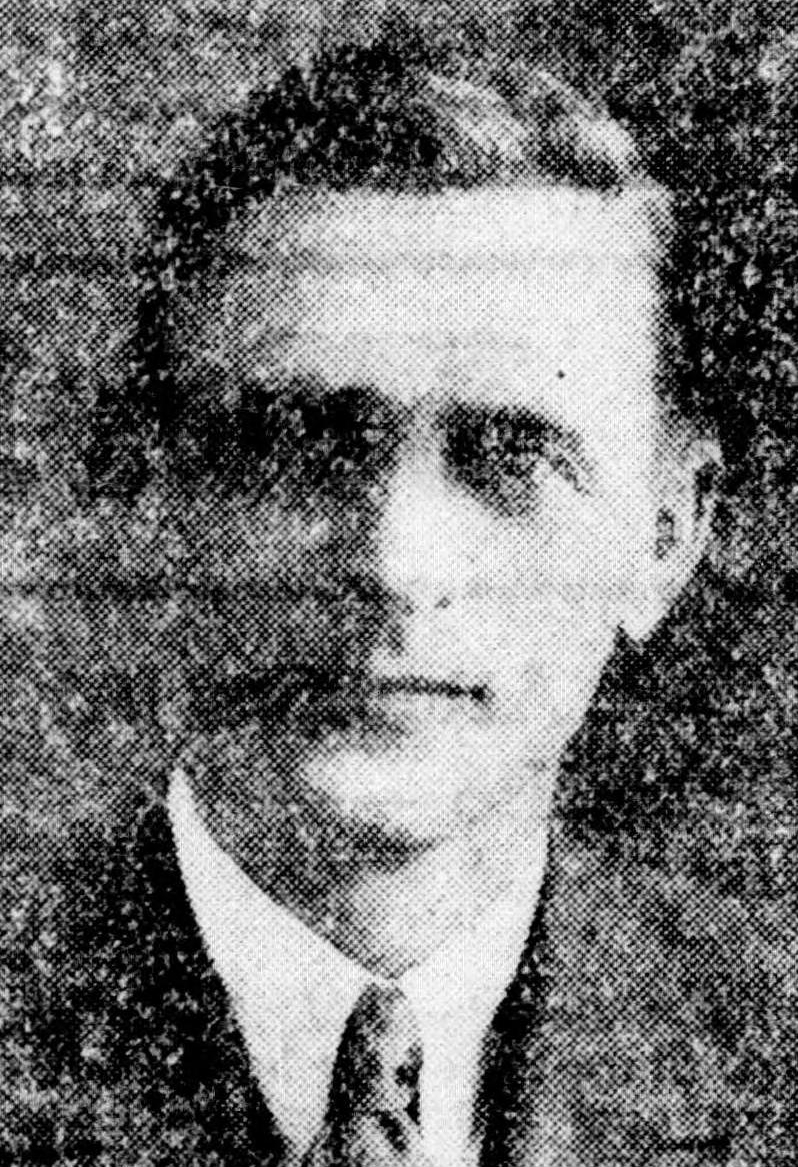
Lambert c. 1934

Rudolph Carl Lambert was an American citizen and head of the California Communist Party Labor Commission and also headed of its security section in the 1940s. Lambert first fell under FBI scrutiny in connection with its Comintern Apparatus investigation. Lambert is named in a 1945 San Francisco KGB cable intercepted and deciphered by the Venona project discussing information about uranium deposits in Western states.

Lambert figured prominently in the U.S. Atomic Energy Commission's investigation and decision to relieve Dr. J. Robert Oppenheimer, Director of the Manhattan Project at Los Alamos, of his security clearance because of documented close associations which Oppenheimer repeatedly denied, yet ultimately admitted to. In a subsection review 'As to "character"' on 29 June 1954 in the Decision in the Matter of Dr. J. Robert Oppenheimer, the Commission wrote,

(3) In 1943, Dr. Oppenheimer indicated to Colonel Lansdale that he did not know Rudy Lambert, a Communist Party functionary. In fact, Dr. Oppenheimer asked Colonel Lansdale what Lambert looked like. Now, however, Dr. Oppenheimer under oath has admitted that he knew and had seen Lambert at least half a dozen times prior to 1943; he supplied a detailed description of Lambert; he said that once or twice he had lunch with Lambert and Isaac Folkoff, another Communist Party functionary, to discuss his (Oppenheimer's) contributions to the Communist Party; and that he knew at the time that Lambert was an official in the Communist Party (Tr. pp. 139, 140, 877).

In Jessica Mitford's book A Fine Old Conflict, Lambert was called Moody Bramlett.
