= Political Affairs (magazine) =

American Marxist magazine

- Cover of August 2005 issue
- Categories: Political magazine
- Frequency: Monthly
- Publisher: Communist Party USA
- First issue: 1944
- Final issue: 2016
- Country: USA
- Based in: New York
- Language: English
- Website: www.politicalaffairs.net
- ISSN: 0032-3128

Political Affairs Magazine is a Marxist publication and the theoretical journal of the Communist Party USA, originally published in print and later online only. It aims to provide an analysis of events from a working class point of view. The magazine is a publication of the Communist Party USA and was founded in 1944 upon the closure of its predecessor, The Communist, which was founded in 1927. Well-known editors of Political Affairs Magazine included V. J. Jerome, Gus Hall, Hyman Lumer, Herbert Aptheker, Gerald Horne, and Joe Sims. Other editors included Max Weiss. Editors of Workers Monthly included Max Bedacht. In 2016, the magazine stopped publishing articles and merged with People's World. In May of 2026, Co-Chair Joe Sims announced on social media that the Communist Party USA would be re-establishing Political Affairs.

== History ==
At its founding, Political Affairs was the theoretical organ of the Communist Party USA, generally publishing articles intended almost exclusively for members of the Communist Party. In the late 1990s, that role changed. Political Affairs shed its role as an internal organ of the Communist Party and adopted a broader stance. It provides Marxist perspectives on many contemporary issues and engages in theoretical discussions relevant to Marxists and the labor movement. In addition to articles devoted to national and international politics, the magazine offers poetry, book reviews, occasional reviews of music and film, interviews, and occasional short stories.

The publication can be traced back to The Masses, the famous Greenwich Village paper of the 1910s. After being suppressed by the government, the paper continued as The Liberator. Independently of this, the Friends of Soviet Russia had established another monthly, Soviet Russia, in 1919. In 1924 the title was changed to Soviet Russia Pictorial. Finally, William Z. Foster had begun Labor Herald as the official publication of his Trade Union Educational League in March 1922. When the Workers Party of America had finally been consolidated as the unified above-ground Communist Party in the United States, it was determined that the party should have a theoretical monthly as well as a daily, in line with Lenin's guideline in What Is To Be Done?

The above three publications were combined into Workers Monthly, which debuted in November 1924. It changed its name to The Communist in 1927 and to Political Affairs in 1944.

Title	Place of publication	Duration
The Masses	New York	Vol. I #1 January 1911 - Vol. X #2 December 1917
Liberator	New York	Vol. I #1 March 1918 - Vol. VII #10 October 1924
Soviet Russia	New York	Vol. I #1 June 1919 - Vol. VII #11 December 1922
Soviet Russia Pictorial	Chicago	Vol. VIII #1 January 1923 - Vol. IX #10 October 1924
Labor Herald	Chicago	Vol. I #1 March 1922 - Vol. III #8 October 1924
Workers Monthly	New York	Vol. IV #1 November 1924 - Vol. V #16 February 1927
The Communist	New York	Vol. VI #1 March 1927 - Vol. XXIII #12 December 1944
Political Affairs	New York	Vol. XXIV #12 January 1945–present
