= V. J. Jerome =

American novelist (1896–1965)

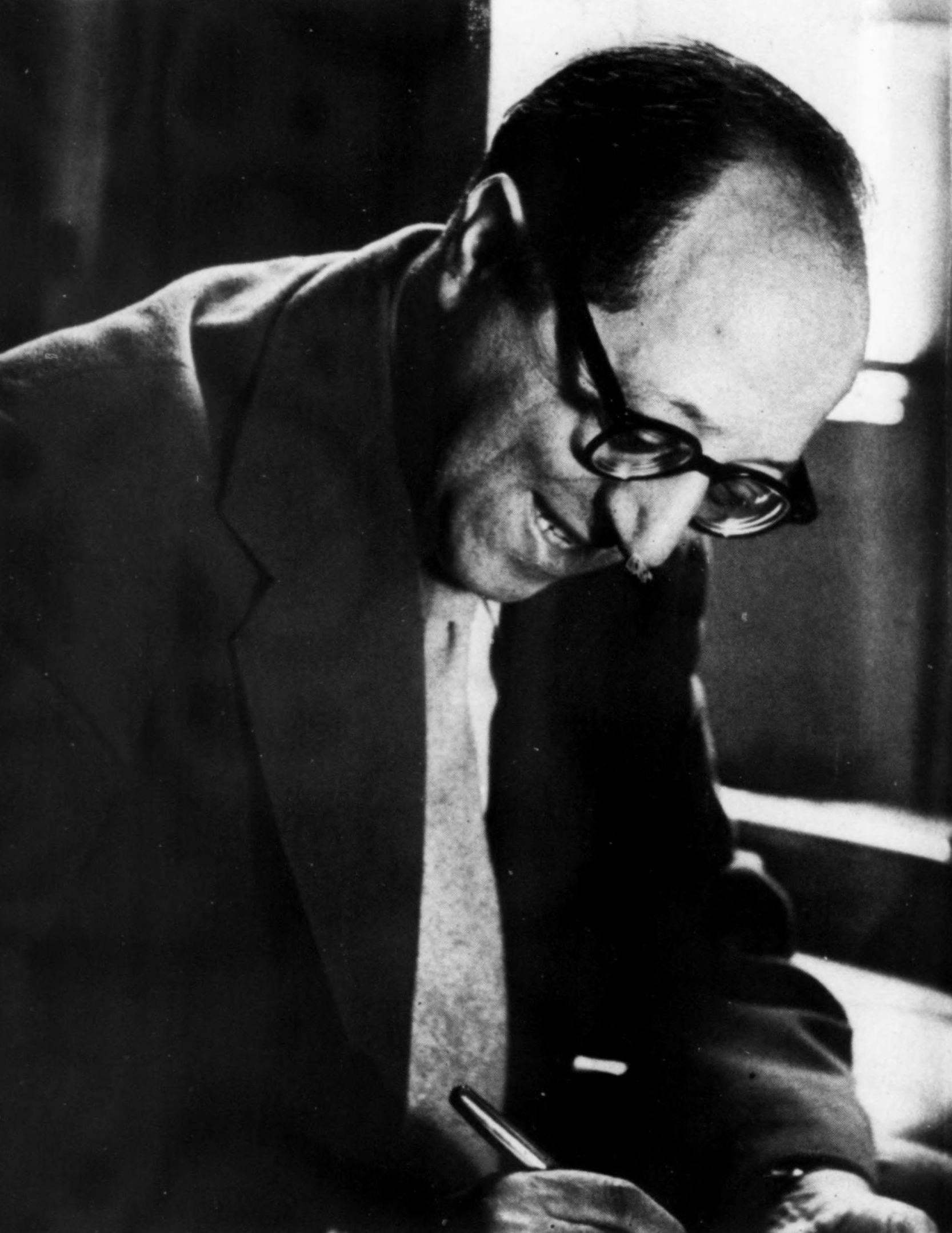
- Image of Jerome featured in Political Affairs on the occasion of his birthday, 1955
- Born: Roman Jerome Isaac; 12 October 1896; Piotrków Governorate, Congress Poland
- Died: 1965 (aged 68–69)
- Education: City College of New York; New York University
- Era: 20th century
- Employer: ILGWU
- Notable work: Grasp the Weapon of Culture!
- Political party: CPUSA
- Movement: Communism
- Spouses: Frances Winwar née Vinciguerra (divorced) Rose Pastor Stokes (m. 1925; died 1933) Alice Hamburger (m. 1937)

Victor Jeremy Jerome (1896–1965) was a Polish-American communist writer and editor based in New York City. He is best remembered as a Marxist cultural essayist and as the long-time editor of The Communist, later known as Political Affairs, the theoretical journal of the Communist Party USA (CPUSA). He was known as the chairman of the party's Cultural Commission, based in New York.

== Early years ==
(Jerome) Isaac Roman, also known by the surname Romain and better known by the pseudonym Victor Jeremy Jerome, was born into a Jewish family in Łódź or Stryków, Vistula Land, on 12 October 1896. After his parents emigrated to London, he lived with relatives in Poland until they were ready for him to join them at age nine. He lived for about ten years in England with his family. According to the 1911 Census of the United Kingdom, a 14-year-old resident Russian alien named Isaac Roman, the son of Harris and Dinah Roman, lived with his parents and brother Nathan at 52 Lucas Street, Commercial Road, Stepney, London; his father Harris Roman was a tailor (baster).

As a young man, Isaac Roman emigrated at the age of 18 to the United States, and was recorded on the passenger list of the SS St. Louis as a Hebrew (Jewish) tailor. The ship sailed from the Port of Liverpool, on 24 July 1915, and arrived at the Port of New York on 1 August 1915. He identified his next of kin as Mr. and Mrs. Roman, of 32 Oxford Street, Stepney, London. His destination was listed as a friend residing at 155 South Second Avenue, Brooklyn, New York. Roman attended City College of New York for higher education.

He left college after marrying Frances Winwar (née Vinciguerra). They had a child together before they divorced. He did not finish college then, but began work as a bookkeeper for the International Ladies' Garment Workers Union in the early 1920s. This experience with the working class helped to radicalize him. In 1928, he officially changed his name by court order from Roman Jerome Isaac to Jerome Isaac Romain.

== Political career ==
In 1924, Romain joined the CPUSA. In 1925, he married Rose Pastor Stokes, a writer and activist who was also of Polish Jewish ancestry and was seventeen years his senior. She had previously been married for 20 years to J.G. Phelps Stokes, a wealthy Episcopalian businessman in New York who supported a settlement house and other philanthropic ventures. They finally divorced over political differences; she was an advocate for birth control and political activism.

Romain returned to college and in 1930, he received a Bachelor of Science degree from New York University. Stokes died of breast cancer in 1933 at the age of 53. Romain moved to Hollywood for a year to raise money for the Spanish Loyalists, or Republicans. Returning to New York in 1935, he became editor of The Communist, writing under the pseudonym V. J. Jerome. The magazine later became known in 1944 as Political Affairs. He served as its editor until 1955. In 1937, he married Alice Hamburger.

Jerome, as he was known was among the cultural spokesmen of the CPUSA, rose in the party hierarchy in the mid-1930s. Membership grew during the economic upheaval and trials of the Great Depression.

Between 1935 and 1965, Jerome wrote constantly. He wrote two autobiographical novels, A Lantern for Jeremy (released during the Foley Square Trials in 1952), and its sequel, The Paper Bridge (published posthumously in 1966). He also published a collection of vignettes titled Unstill Waters (1964).

A prolific writer, Jerome created short stories, plays, and literary, and art criticism. But he is best known for his political and cultural essays, such as "The Intellectuals and the War" (1940), "Culture in a Changing World" (1948), and "The Negro in Hollywood Films" (1950). During this period he was chairman of the CPUSA's Cultural Commission and was "considered a bluntly dogmatic thinker," serving a role in the US similar to that of Zhdanov in the Soviet Union.

In the postwar period, Congress and local governments reacted to the Cold War with investigations of communist activity. Jerome was prosecuted and convicted under the Smith Act for committing the "overt act" of conspiracy to teach and encourage the overthrow of the US government through his pamphlet, "Grasp the Weapon of Culture", which he presented as a report to the CPUSA in 1950. He recommended that the Party consider art and entertainment part of its "mass work".

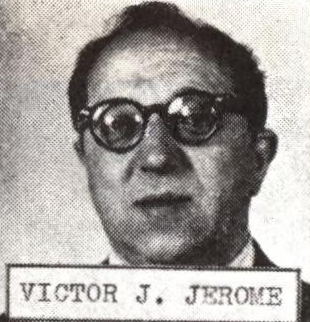
Jerome's FBI mugshot, 1951

He was indicted in 1951, together with 16 other Communist leaders, during a second wave of trials of communist leaders that took place across the country. The first trial was conducted in New York in 1947. During a nine-month trial in New York's federal Foley Square Courthouse, Jerome passed the long hours in court writing poetry and reading page proofs of his memoir, A Lantern for Jeremy. He was convicted and sentenced in 1953 to three years at Lewisburg Penitentiary, which he served between 1955 and 1957. Shortly before going to prison, he resigned from Political Affairs, complaining that the Party made decisions without him.

Following his release, Jerome spent 1958 in Poland. After which he worked for two years in Moscow as an editor of a collection of Vladimir Lenin's works. He returned to the US and began writing a novel based on the life of Spinoza.

== Death ==
He died in 1965, at the age of 68.

== Bibliography ==
- Leninism, the Only Marxism Today: A Discussion of the Characteristics of Declining Capitalism. With Alexander Bittelman. New York: Workers Library Publishers, 1934.
- Social-Democracy and the War. New York: Workers Library Publishers, 1940.
- Intellectuals and the War. New York: Workers Library Publishers, 1940.
- The Path Dimitroff Charted, New York, Workers Library Publishers, 1943.
- The Treatment of Defeated Germany. New York: New Century Publishers, 1945.
- A World "Christian Front"? What is Behind the Alliance between the Vatican and Finance Capital? The Anti-Social Ethics of Red-Baiters: A Reply to Clare Boothe Luce. New York: New Masses, 1947.
- Culture in a Changing World, a Marxist approach. New York: New Century Publishers, 1947.
- The Negro in Hollywood Films. New York: Masses & Mainstream, 1950.
- Grasp the Weapon of Culture! New York: New Century Publishers, 1951.
- A Lantern for Jeremy: A Novel. New York: New Century Publishers, 1952. (Juvenile audience)
- The Paper Bridge: A Novel. New York: Citadel Press, 1966.
