= Pettis Perry =

American Communist Party leader (1897–1965)

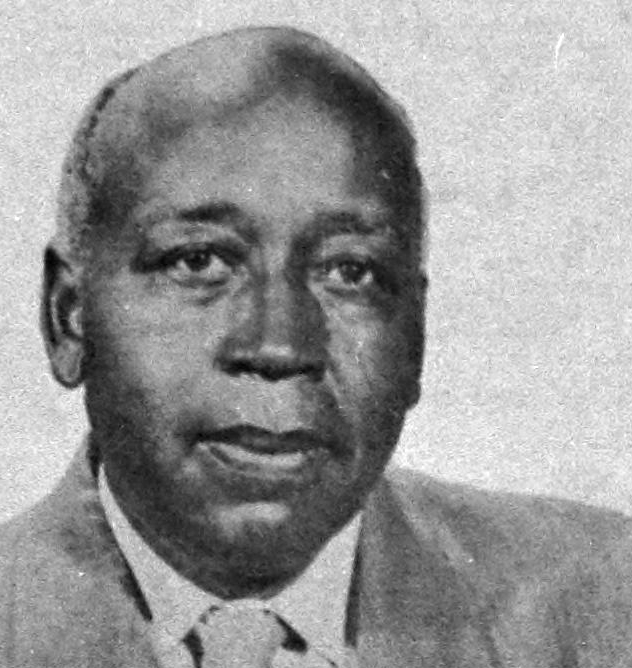
Perry c. 1952

Pettis Perry (January 4, 1897 – July 24, 1965) was an American Communist Party official.

== Biography ==
Perry was born on a tenant farm near Marion, Alabama. He moved to Los Angeles in the 1920s, where he worked as a farm laborer in the Imperial Valley. Perry was inspired to join the Communist Party because of its work on behalf of the Scottsboro Boys. In 1933, Perry became the first African-American candidate for Lieutenant Governor of California, running on the Communist Party ticket.

Perry moved from California to New York City in 1948. In New York, Perry directed the Party's National Negro Commission until 1954. In 1949, Perry began a campaign to eliminate white chauvinism and racism in the Party, traveling to Party branches around the country to discuss the issue. While acknowledging the validity of Perry's concerns, Steve Nelson and Joseph Starobin argued that the campaign had been divisive and harmful to the Party.

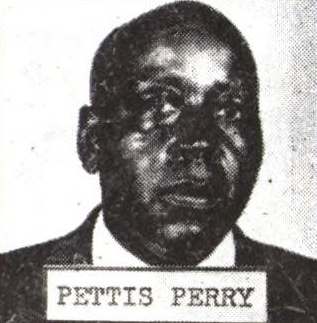
Perry's FBI mugshot, 1951

Perry was arrested on June 20, 1951, with twenty other Communist Party leaders, under the Smith Act. During the trial, Perry argued that the proceedings were unfair, describing them as "a frameup so enormous as to resemble the Reichstag Fire trial". He and seven of the other defendants were sentenced to three years in jail and fined $5000. After his release from prison in 1957, Perry continued working in the Party and died in Moscow in 1965.

Perry was the inspiration for the character of Bart, a Black Communist leader, in Chester Himes' novel Lonely Crusade.
