= Abraham J. Isserman =

American communist lawyer (1900–1988)

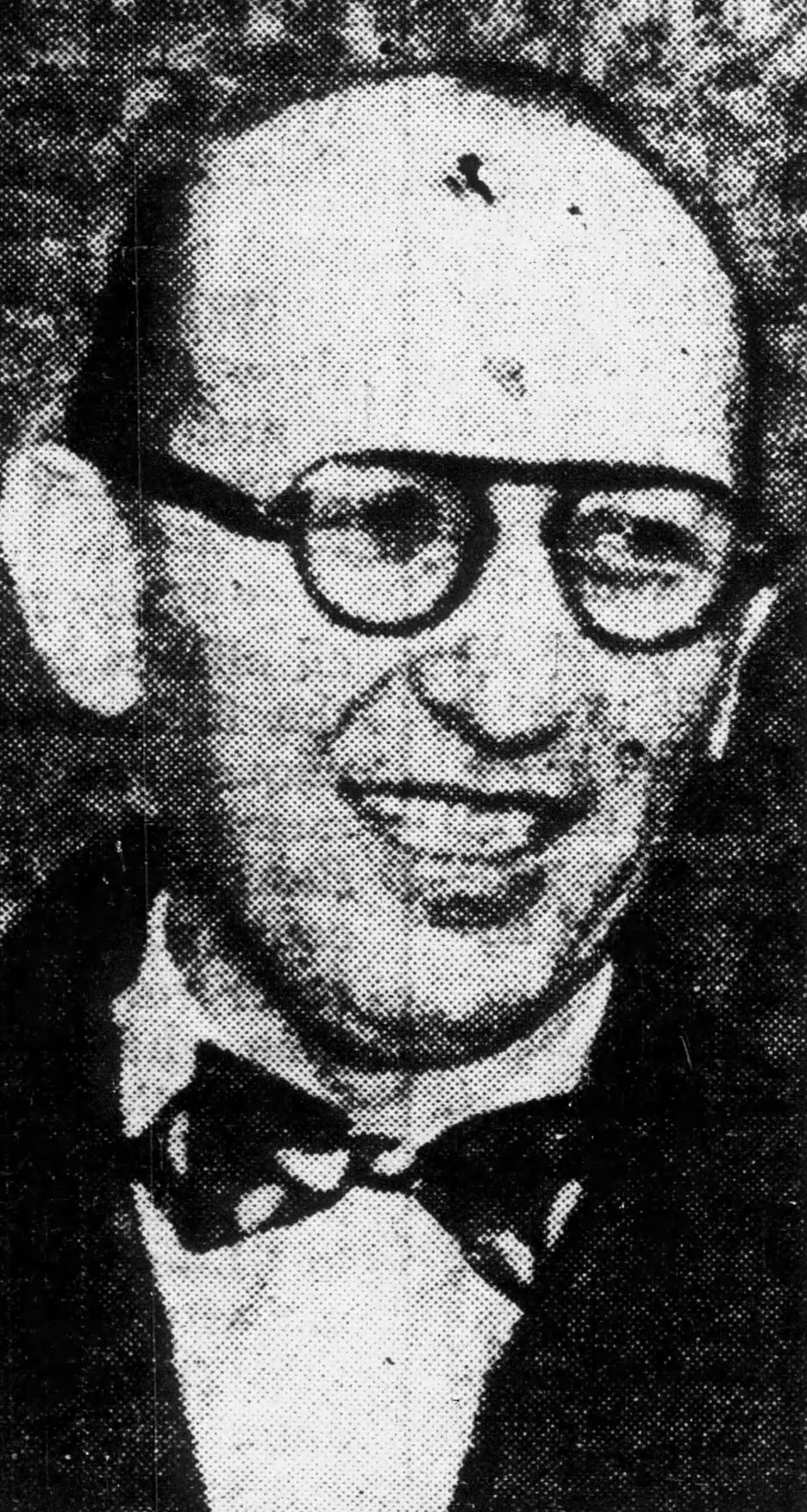
- Isserman c. 1949
- Born: Abraham J. Isserman; May 11, 1900; Belgium
- Died: April 22, 1988 (aged 87); New York City, U.S.
- Other names: A.J. Isserman, Abraham Isserman, Abe Isserman
- Occupation: Labor lawyer
- Known for: Defended Gerhart Eisler (1947) and CPUSA leaders in Foley Square trial (1949)
- Children: 1
- Relatives: Maurice Isserman (nephew)

Abraham J. Isserman (May 11, 1900 – April 22, 1988) was an American lawyer and activist who defended Gerhart Eisler in 1947, and leaders of the CPUSA in the 1949 Foley Square trial. Isserman was found in contempt of court by Judge Harold Medina, sentenced to four months in jail in 1952, and was disbarred.

== Background ==
Isserman was born on May 11, 1900, in Belgium.

== Career ==
Abraham J. Isserman and Morris Isserman were private attorneys at Isserman & Isserman, 24 Commerce Street, Newark, New Jersey.

His clients included Edith Berkman, the New Jersey chapter of the Congress of Industrial Organizations, and the American Newspaper Guild.

In the 1930s through 1941, he served as counsel for the American Civil Liberties Union.

=== "Communist lawyer" ===
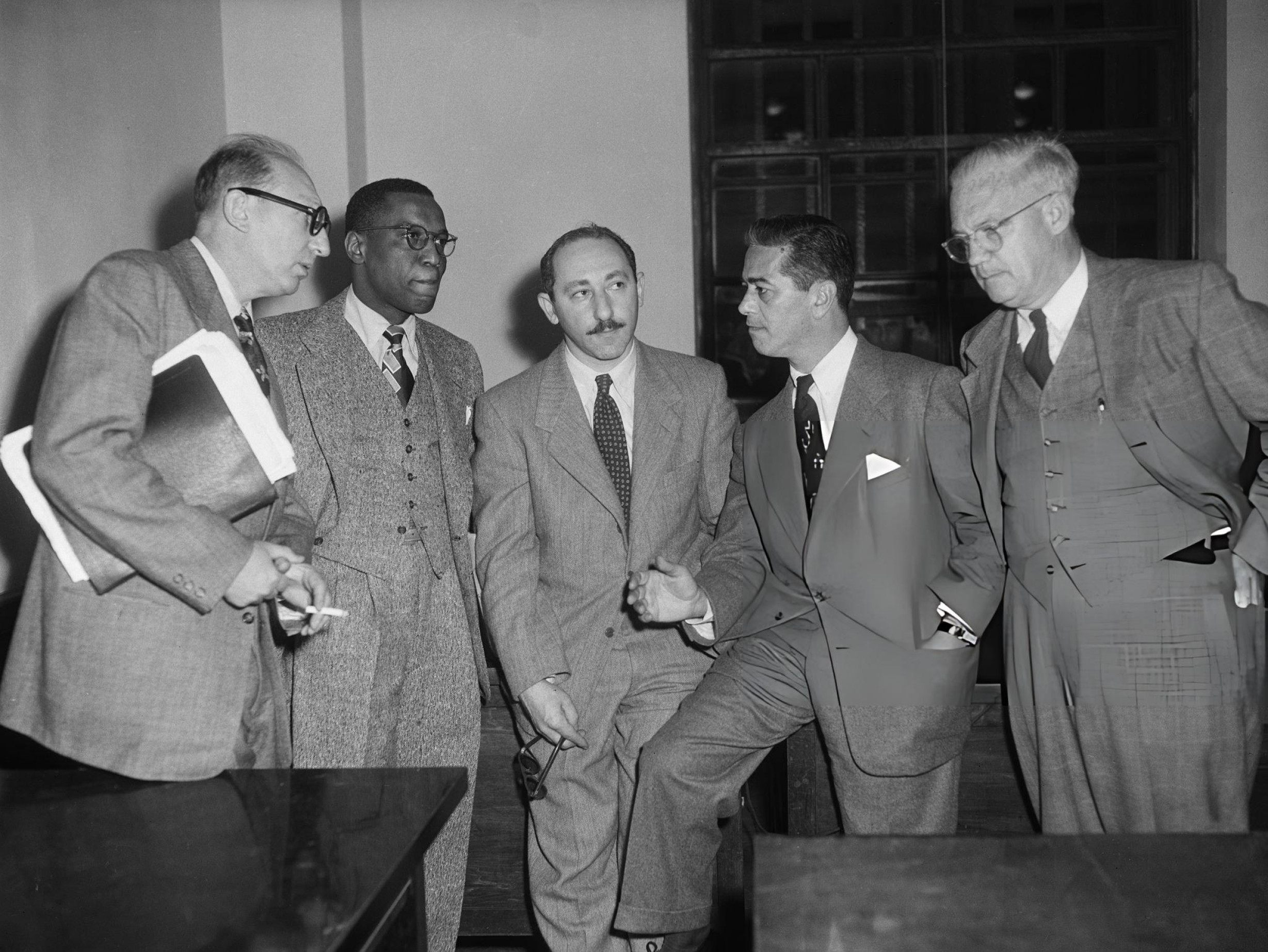
The five defense attorneys sent to jail for contempt of court during the Smith Act trials: Abraham Isserman, George W. Crockett Jr., Richard Gladstein, Harry Sacher, and Louis F. McCabe.

Isserman was a member of the Communist Party, and had been identified by the Federal government as one of several "communist lawyers."

In 1939, the House Un-American Activities Committee (HUAC) reported that Isserman was a member of the national committee of the International Juridical Association, a communist-leaning group co-founded by Carol Weiss King and Shad Polier among others.

In 1939, ACLU chief Roger Nash Baldwin asked Isserman to prepare a legal brief on whether witnesses called before the Dies Committee (predecessor to HUAC) could invoke the Fifth Amendment. The memo stalled due to internal ACLU issues. Isserman quit the ACLU, and National Federation for Constitutional Liberties published his memo in 1941 as Investigating Committees and Civil Rights.

In April 1943, Walter Gellhorn, then New York Regional Attorney and Assistant General Counsel (later professor of law at Columbia University) testified before HUAC as follows:

Mr. MATTHEWS: Do you know Abraham J. Isserman?
Mr. GELLHORN: Yes.
Mr. MATTHEWS: Do you have any personal views on whether Mr. Isserman is a Communist or a communist sympathizer?
Mr. GELLHORN: I imagine the latter. I have no information on the former. I know him to be a competent attorney. I have consulted with him on one or two labor matters.

=== Gerhart Eisler trial ===
In 1947, with Carol Weiss King, Isserman defended Gerhart Eisler in a trial over a fraudulent passport. (The Federal government believed that the full "Eisler defense committee included: Max Bedacht, Dr. Felix Boenheim, Charles Collins, Eugene P. Connolly, Gustav Faber, Ida Guggenheimer, Isserman, King, Albert Maltz, and Walter Mueller.)

In the press, Eisler had been accused of being a mastermind for Soviet spies in the United States. On February 17, 1947, Life (magazine) magazine ran "The Career of Gerhart Eisler as a Comintern Agent" whose subtext read "Prototyp of a professional, Moscow-schooled revolutionary, he is now charged with conspiracy against the government of the U.S."

During proceedings, Isserman stated, "I charge that this whole procedure is in bad faith and savors to me of something more."

Eisler skipped bail and left the country by means of a Polish freighter.

In 1949, the court removed Eisler v. United States, 338 U.S. 189, from the docket, pending return of the fugitive Eisler.

=== Foley Square trial ===
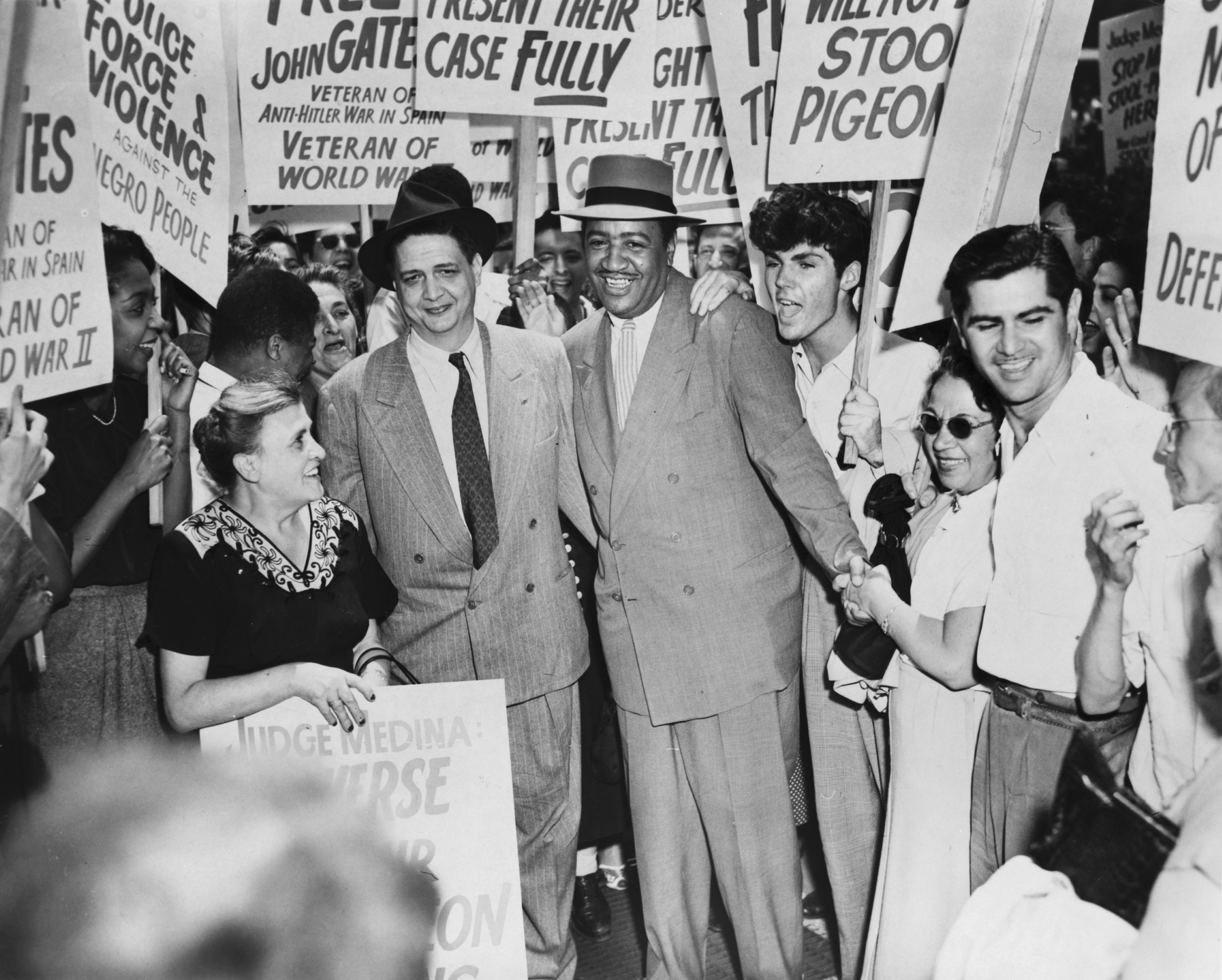
Defendants Robert Thompson and Benjamin J. Davis during Foley Square trial, which Isserman helped defend

In 1949, Isserman served as one of five attorneys led by Harry Sacher as lead counsel to represent 11 members of the CPUSA's national board, accused of conspiring to teach and advocate the violent overthrow of the Government. The other three attorneys were Richard Gladstein, Louis F. McCabe, and George W. Crockett, Jr. (Sometimes, Isserman is cited as chief counsel.) Isserman was representing Gil Green and John Williamson.

During an appeal of the conviction, Isserman and colleagues accused trial judge Harold R. Medina of improperly favoring the prosecution. The defendants lost their appeal and went to prison.

==== Contempt, disbarment ====
Further, Isserman and Crockett among other defense attorneys was found in contempt of court. In 1952, Isserman went to jail for four months, despite support from groups like the National Lawyers Guild.

In 1954, he was disbarred from law practice in the State of New Jersey.

Following a 1953 order, he was also disbarred from the U.S. Supreme Court (In re Isserman, 348 U.S. 1 1954).

==== Restoration ====
In 1961, the New Jersey's Supreme Court voided the disbarment and had his license restored.

== Personal and death ==
On April 22, 1988, Isserman died in a nursing home in New York City after several strokes.

Maurice Isserman is his nephew.

== See also ==
- International Juridical Association
- American Civil Liberties Union
- Gerhart Eisler
- Foley Square trial
