= Irving Potash =

American trade unionist (1902–1976)

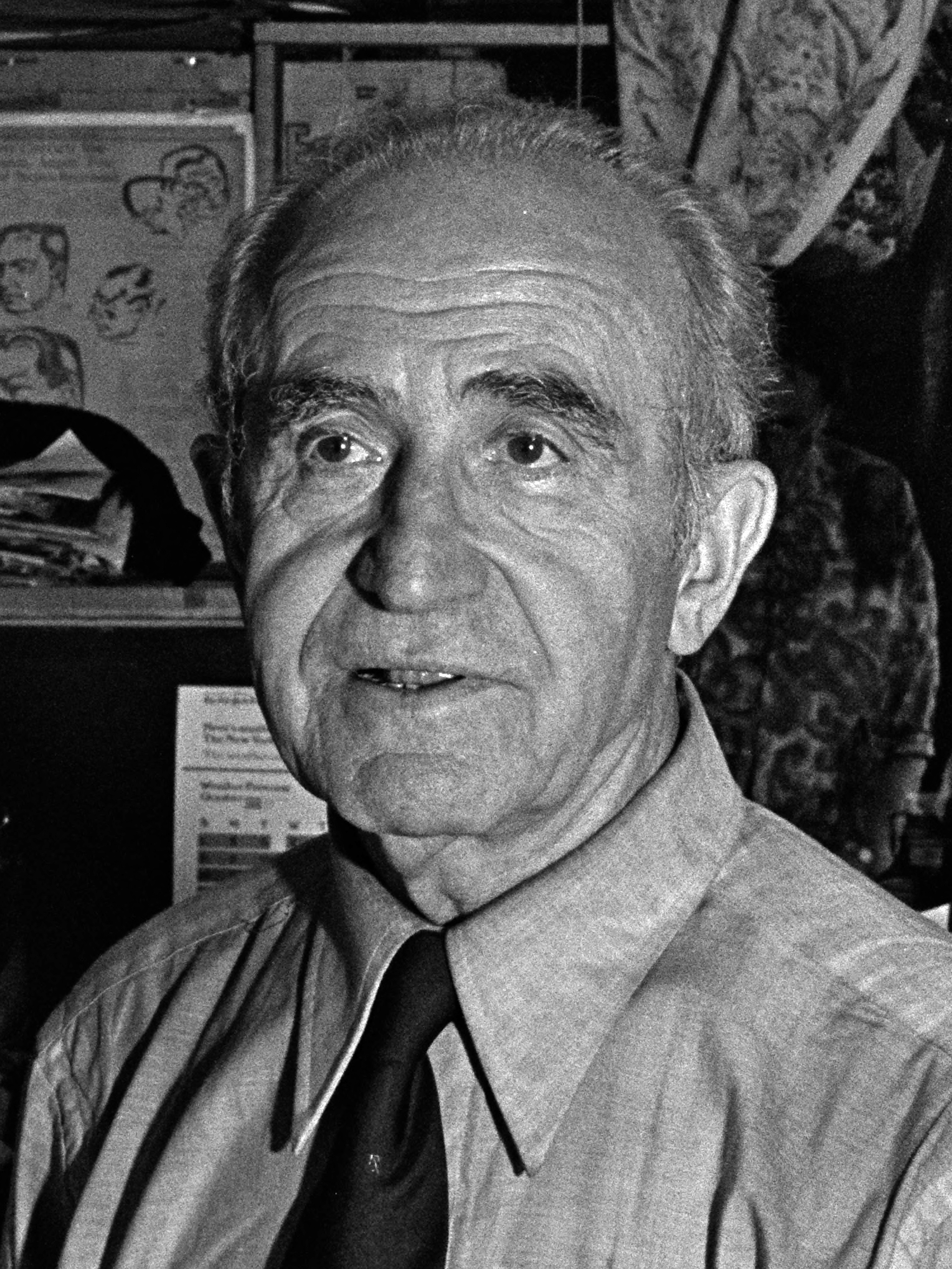
- Potash in 1972
- Born: December 15, 1902; Starokostiantyniv, Volhynia Governorate, Russian Empire
- Died: August 16, 1976 (aged 73); Moscow, Soviet Union
- Occupation: Trade union leader
- Years active: 1920–1955
- Organization: International Fur and Leather Workers Union
- Known for: One of twelve defendants in the 1949 Foley Square trial
- Political party: Socialist (1916–1919); Communist (after 1919)

Irving Potash (December 15, 1902 – August, 16, 1976) was a Ukrainian-born American Communist and leader in the International Fur and Leather Workers Union. He was one of twelve defendants in the 1949 Foley Square trial held at the height of the Second Red Scare.

== Background ==
Potash was born in Starokostiantyniv, Russia in 1902. He immigrated to the United States with his family when he was 10.

== Career ==
=== Union activities ===
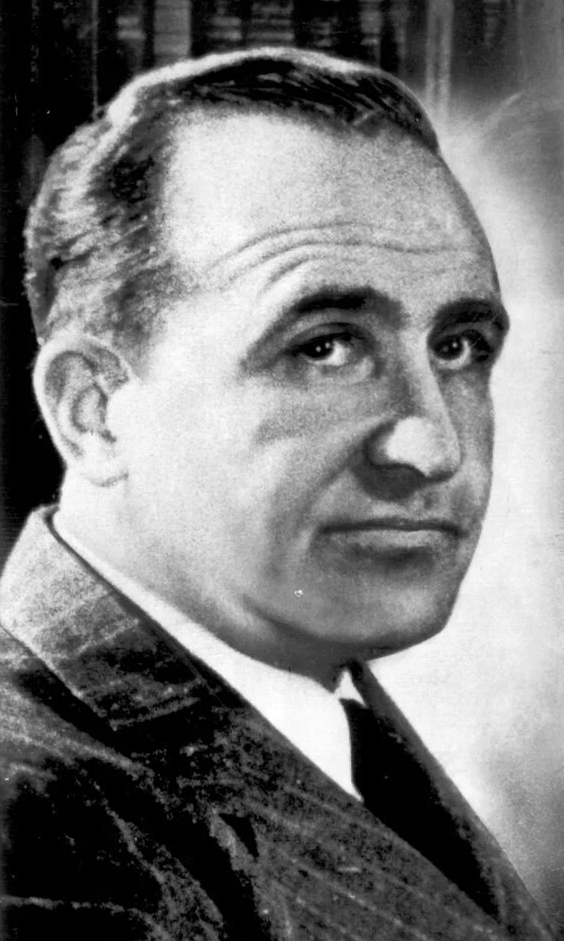
Potash earlier in his career

In 1916, Potash joined a branch of the Socialist Party in Williamsburg, eventually leaving the Party with the other Williamsburg socialists to enter the Communist Party around 1919. His involvement in the International Fur and Leather Workers Union originated while he was a student at City College, when he asked Ben Gold if the Union could get him a job in a fur shop. In 1920, Potash was sentenced to three years for criminal anarchy in a Brooklyn court.

While working for the Union, Potash helped to reduce the influence of mobsters like Jacob Shapiro and Lepke Buchalter over the IFLWU. Potash and Samuel Burt testified against the two mobsters in court, securing a conviction. Their testimony on October 29, 1937, linked Shapiro and Buchalter to violent intimidation tactics. Around this time, Potash was elected to be the manager of the Furrier's Joint Council, CIO, and he would be re-elected to this position in the following six consecutive elections until 1949.

=== Second Red Scare ===
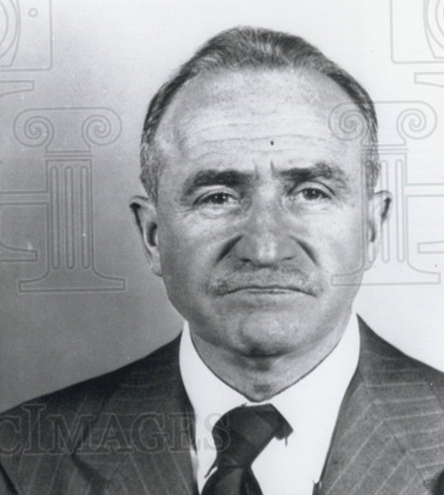
Potash's FBI mugshot, 1948

In July, 1948 Potash was indicted with 12 other members of the Communist Party on charges of plotting to overthrow the government.

During the 1949 Peekskill riots, Potash was traveling in the same car as Paul Robeson when they were attacked by a mob. He was struck by a stone thrown through his windshield and lost sight in one eye.

While on Ellis Island awaiting trial, he participated in a hunger strike that lasted until he and four other detainees were granted bail.

=== Smith Act trials ===
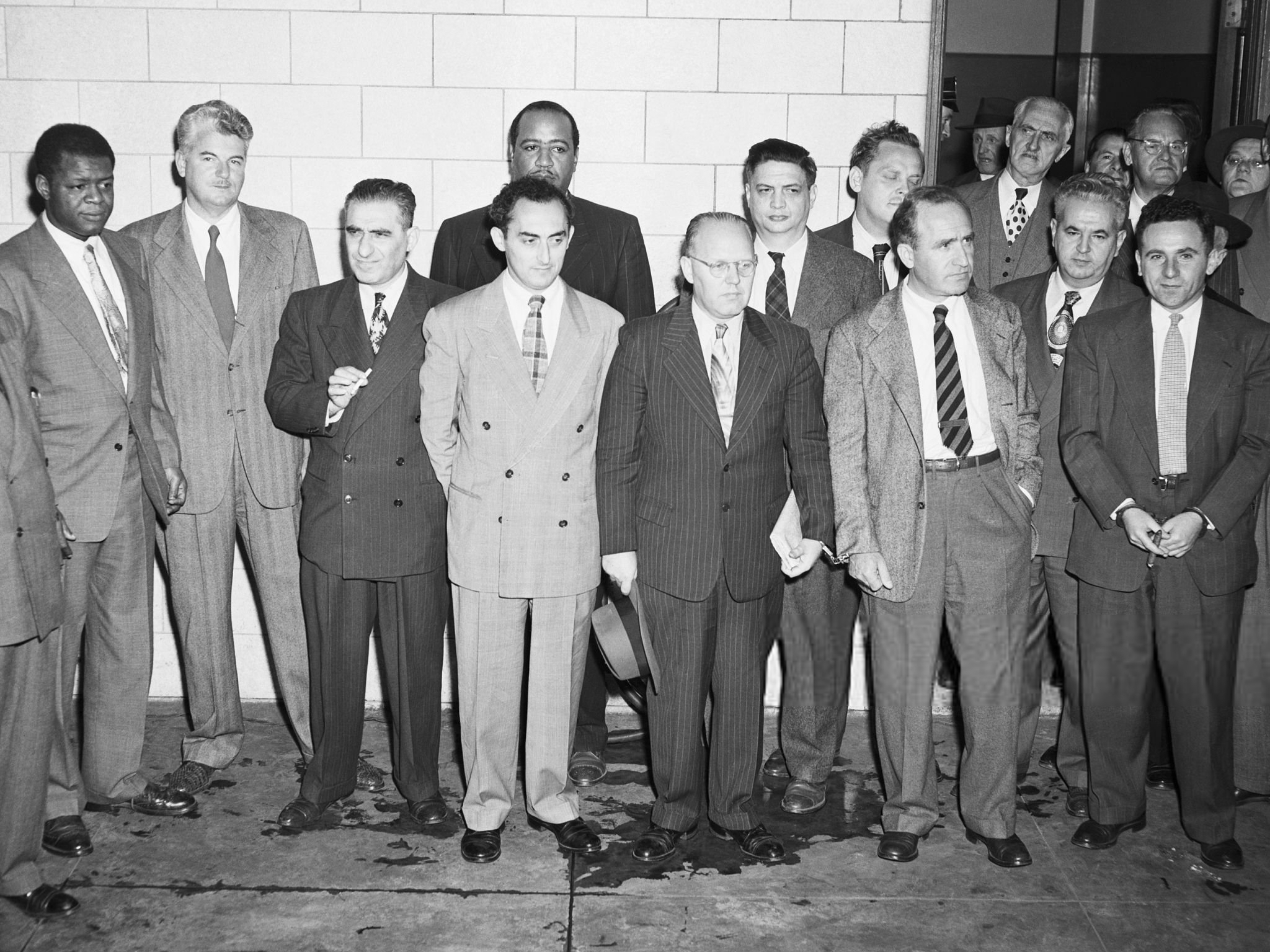
The Communists convicted in the Smith Act trials stand outside Foley Square Courthouse following the verdict, December 6, 1949. (L-R): Henry Winston, Eugene Dennis, Jack Stachel, Gil Green, Benjamin J. Davis Jr., John Williamson, Robert G. Thompson, Gus Hall, Irving Potash, Carl Winter and John Gates.

After the case went to trial, Potash and the other defendants received sentences of five years in federal prison. While serving his sentence at Leavenworth Penitentiary, Potash worked in the bakery and tried to teach other inmates about Communism. He was released from Leavenworth on December 9, 1954. Immediately after his release, he was indicted on the charge of being a member of the Communist Party. Potash left the United States in 1955 for Poland, avoiding a second trial under the Smith Act on these charges.

=== Later life ===
He returned to the United States and while eating in a Bronxville restaurant on the night of January 4, 1957, he was arrested by the FBI for illegally re-entering the country. He was sentenced to two years in prison.

== Death ==
Potash died on August 16, 1976 in Moscow, while he was visiting the Soviet Union for medical care.
