= Harry Sacher (lawyer) =

Communist lawyer

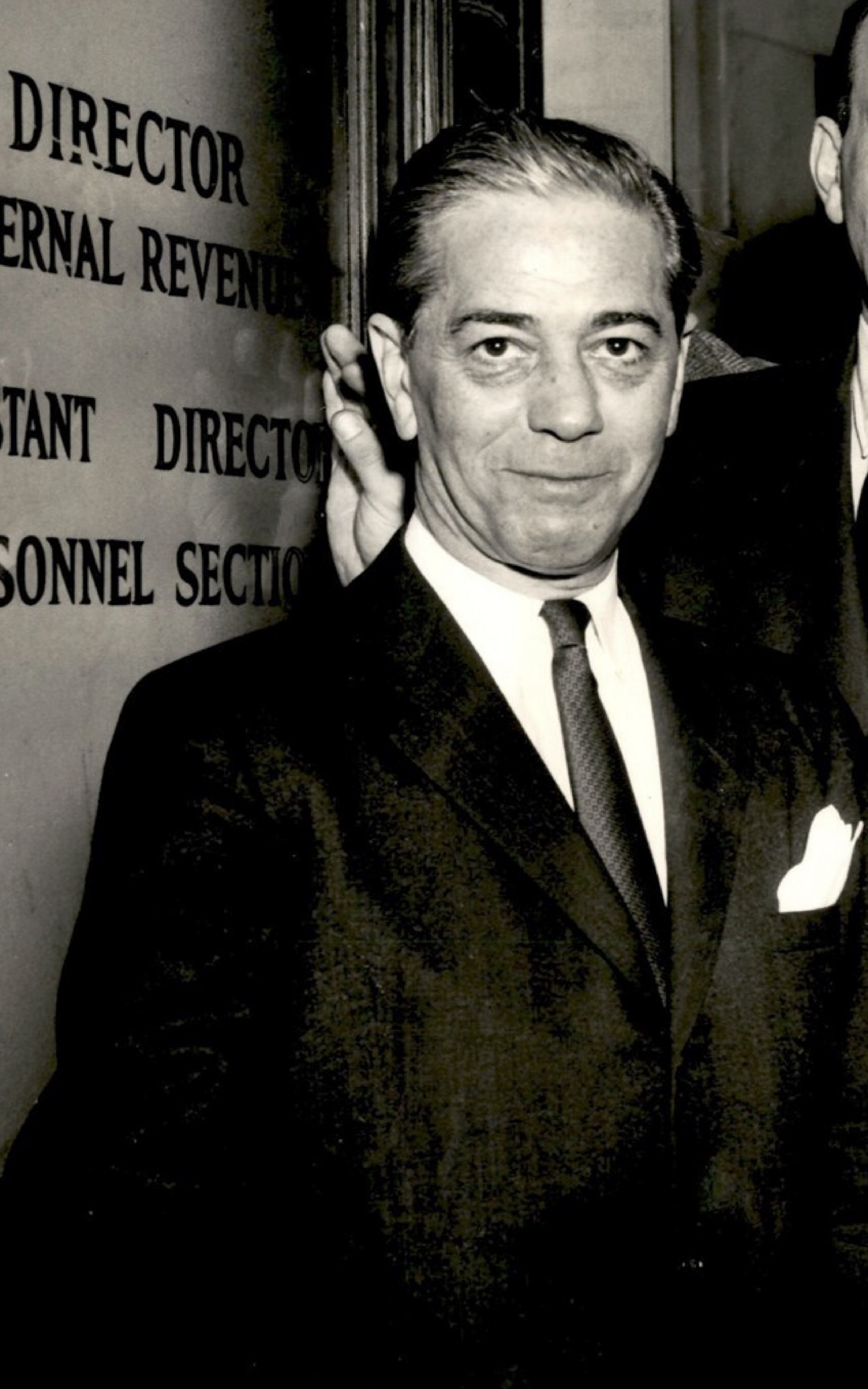
Sacher in 1956

Harry Sacher (August 22, 1902– May 22, 1963) was an American attorney best known for his work on behalf of Communist political figures. Sacher was the named petitioner in three United States Supreme Court cases. He also worked as an attorney and organizer with the Transport Workers Union of America

== Significant cases ==
=== Communist Trials ===
See Smith Act trials of Communist Party leaders.

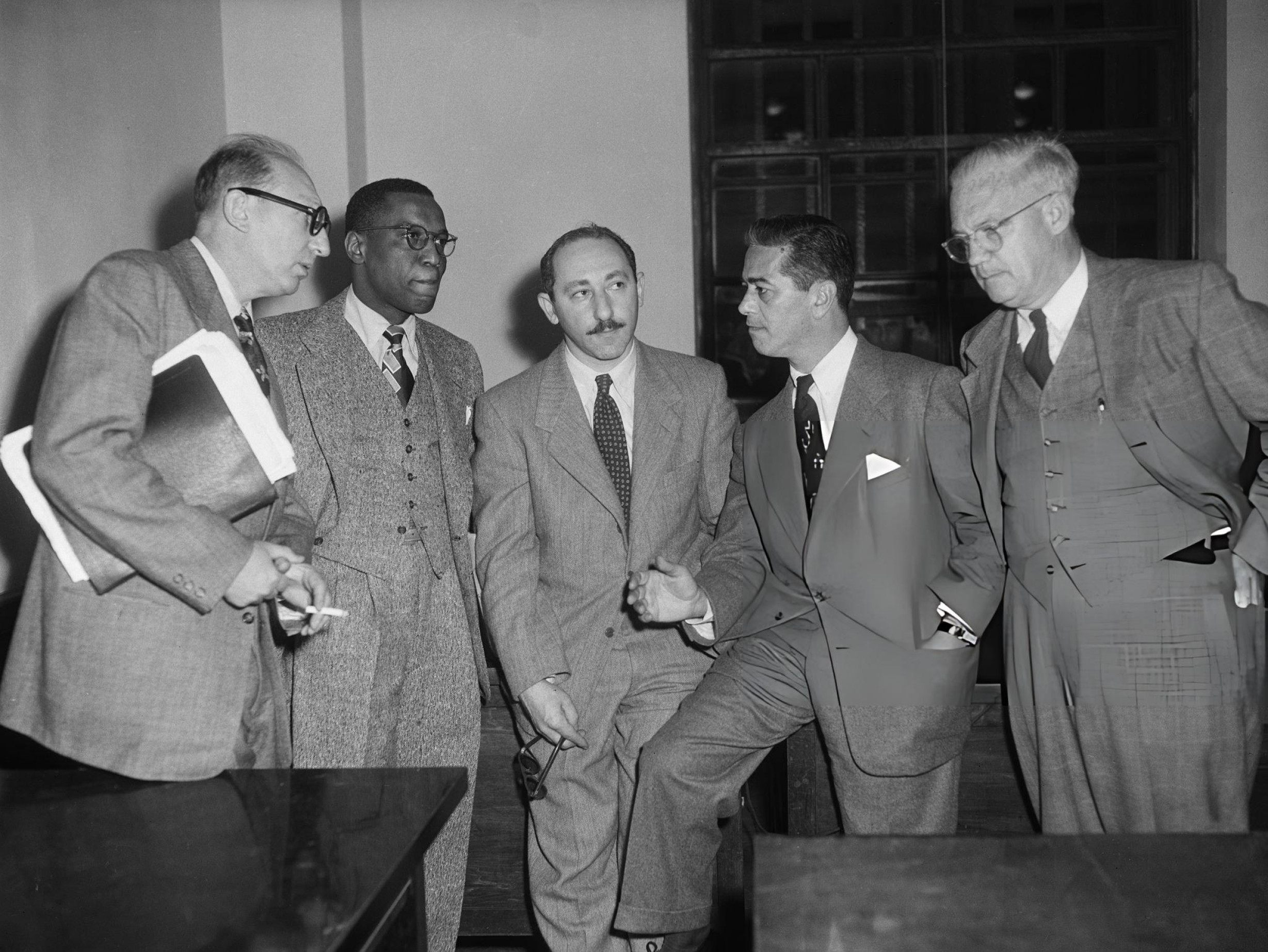
The five defense attorneys sent to jail for contempt of court during the Smith Act trials: Abraham Isserman, George W. Crockett Jr., Richard Gladstein, Harry Sacher, and Louis F. McCabe.

Sacher represented Irving Potash, Benjamin J. Davis Jr., and John Gates in a 1949 trial for charges of conspiring to overthrow the United States Time wrote that Sacher "looked like a Dead End Kid" and "insinuated at one point that Judge Medina was prejudicing the trial".

=== Sacher v. United States (1952) ===
See Sacher v. United States Sacher was convicted of Contempt of Court by Judge Harold Medina and sentenced to six months in jail. He appealed Judge Medina's action, leading to a 5-3 decision by the Supreme Court to uphold the sanction. His six month sentence was, along with Richard Gladstein's, the longest sentence handed down for Contempt in the trial.

=== Sacher v. Association of the Bar of the City of New York (1954) ===
Sacher was disbarred after his representation of Potash, Davis Jr., and Gates. He sued, and the Supreme Court held that his disbarment was an abuse of discretion.

=== Sacher v. United States (1958) ===
Sacher was one of several suspected Communists subpoenaed by the United States Senate Subcommittee on Internal Security. He answered questions, but was convicted of contempt nonetheless. The Supreme Court held in a 6-2 per curiam opinion that Sacher's indictment for contempt of Congress did not meet the minimum pleading requirements under 2 U.S.C. § 192. Justices Clark and Whittaker dissented.

== Personal life ==
Sacher was married to Tolbie Sacher, a musician and collaborator of Abel Meeropol.
