= Robert G. Thompson =

American politician (1915–1965)

- Thompson in 1946

Chairman of the Communist Party of New York
- In office August 19, 1945 – c. July 1954
- Preceded by: Gil Green

Personal details
- Born: June 21, 1915 Grants Pass, Oregon, U.S.
- Died: October 16, 1965 (aged 50) New York City, New York, U.S.
- Resting place: Arlington National Cemetery
- Party: Communist
- Spouse: Sylvia
- Children: Ellen; James
- Nickname: Bob

Military service
- Allegiance: Spanish Republic; United States
- Branch/service: International Brigades; United States Army
- Years of service: 1937–1938; 1942–1943
- Rank: Battalion Commander; Staff Sergeant
- Unit: The "Abraham Lincoln" XV International Brigade; 32nd Infantry Division
- Commands: Mackenzie–Papineau Battalion
- Battles/wars: Spanish Civil War; Battle of Jarama (WIA); Battle of Fuentes de Ebro; World War II; Pacific Theater; Battle of Buna–Gona
- Awards: Distinguished Service Cross

Robert George Thompson (June 21, 1915 – October 16, 1965) was an American Communist who fought in the Spanish Civil War and World War II. He was awarded the Distinguished Service Cross during the New Guinea campaign, but was later imprisoned for several years due to his communist sympathies.

== Early life ==
Thompson was born in Grants Pass, Oregon on June 21, 1915. In his youth he worked as a machinist and lumberjack. He joined the Communist Party in the early 1930s, rising to become secretary of the Young Communist League in Ohio. By 1935, he was a resident of Oakland, California.

== Career ==
=== Spanish Civil War ===
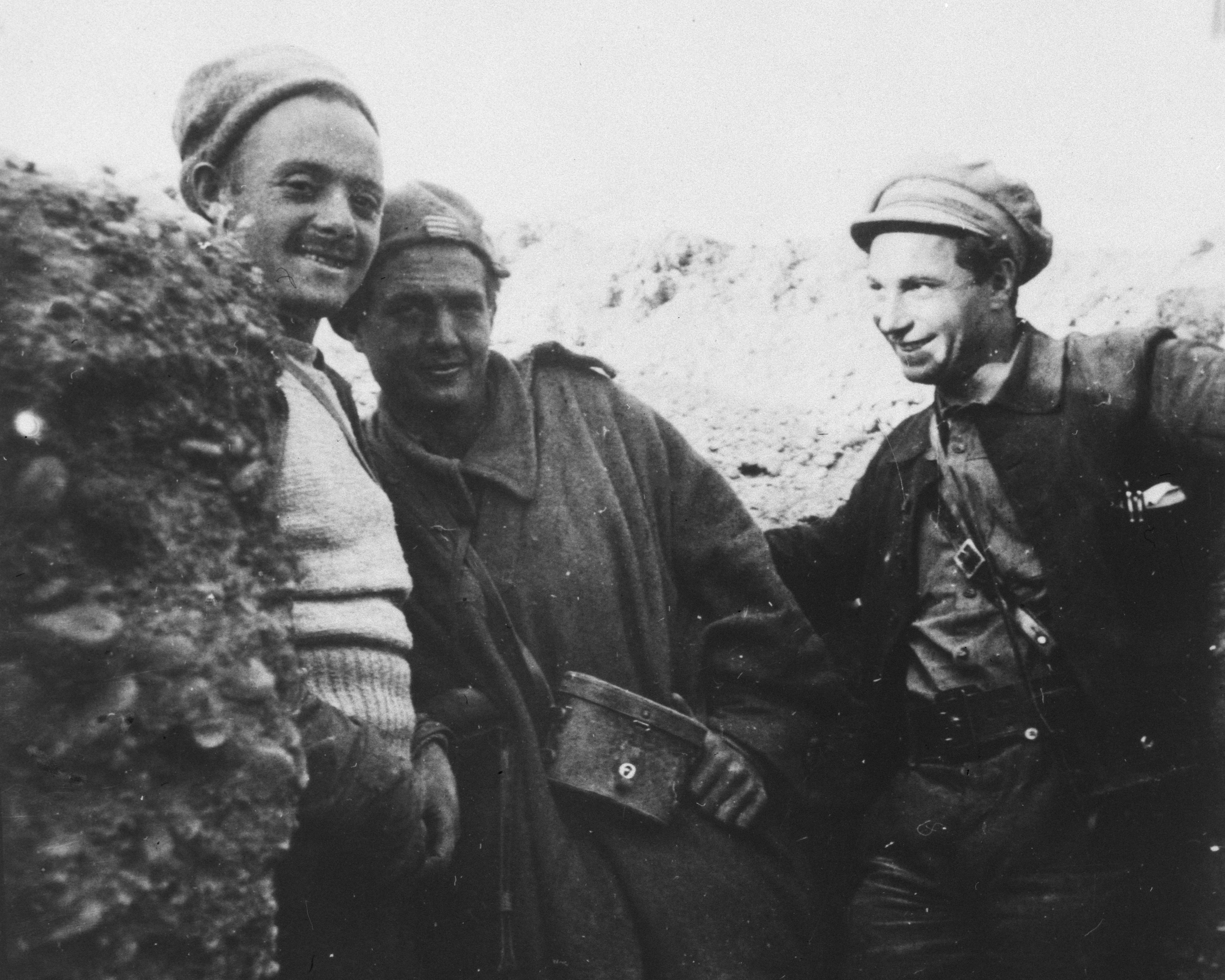
Thompson (middle) with fellow YCL leaders Saul Wellman (left) and Dave Doran (right) c. fall 1937

Thompson's first foray into war came in February 1937, when he volunteered in the Abraham Lincoln Brigade to fight for the Republicans in the Spanish Civil War against General Francisco Franco and the Nationalists. Thompson first served in the predominantly-American Lincoln Battalion and was wounded in action at the Battle of Jarama. He then attended officer training school and took over as commander of the predominantly-Canadian Mackenzie–Papineau Battalion, leading it during the Battle of Fuentes de Ebro. He returned to the United States in August 1938.

=== World War II ===
Following the outbreak of World War II, Thompson was "eager to take another crack at the Axis," enlisting in the U.S. Army in 1942. He was sent to the Pacific Theater and saw action in the New Guinea Campaign. During the Battle of Buna–Gona, he was cited for extraordinary heroism and was awarded the Distinguished Service Cross. The citation read:

For extraordinary heroism in action near Tarakena, New Guinea, on January 11, 1943. Volunteering to lead a small patrol in an attempt to establish a foothold on the opposite shore, Staff Sergeant Thompson swam the swollen and rapid Konembi River in broad daylight and under heavy enemy fire. Armed only with a pistol and hand grenades, he assisted in towing a rope to the other shore where he remained under cover of the bank and directed the crossing of his platoon. Staff Sergeant Thompson then led the platoon against two enemy machine-gun emplacements which dominated the crossing, and wiped them out. The success of this action permitted the advance of the entire company and secured a bridge-head for the advance of the following units.

Although he was approved for a battlefield commission as a captain, Thompson was hospitalized for malaria and tuberculosis and received an honorable discharge later that year.

=== Communist Party ===
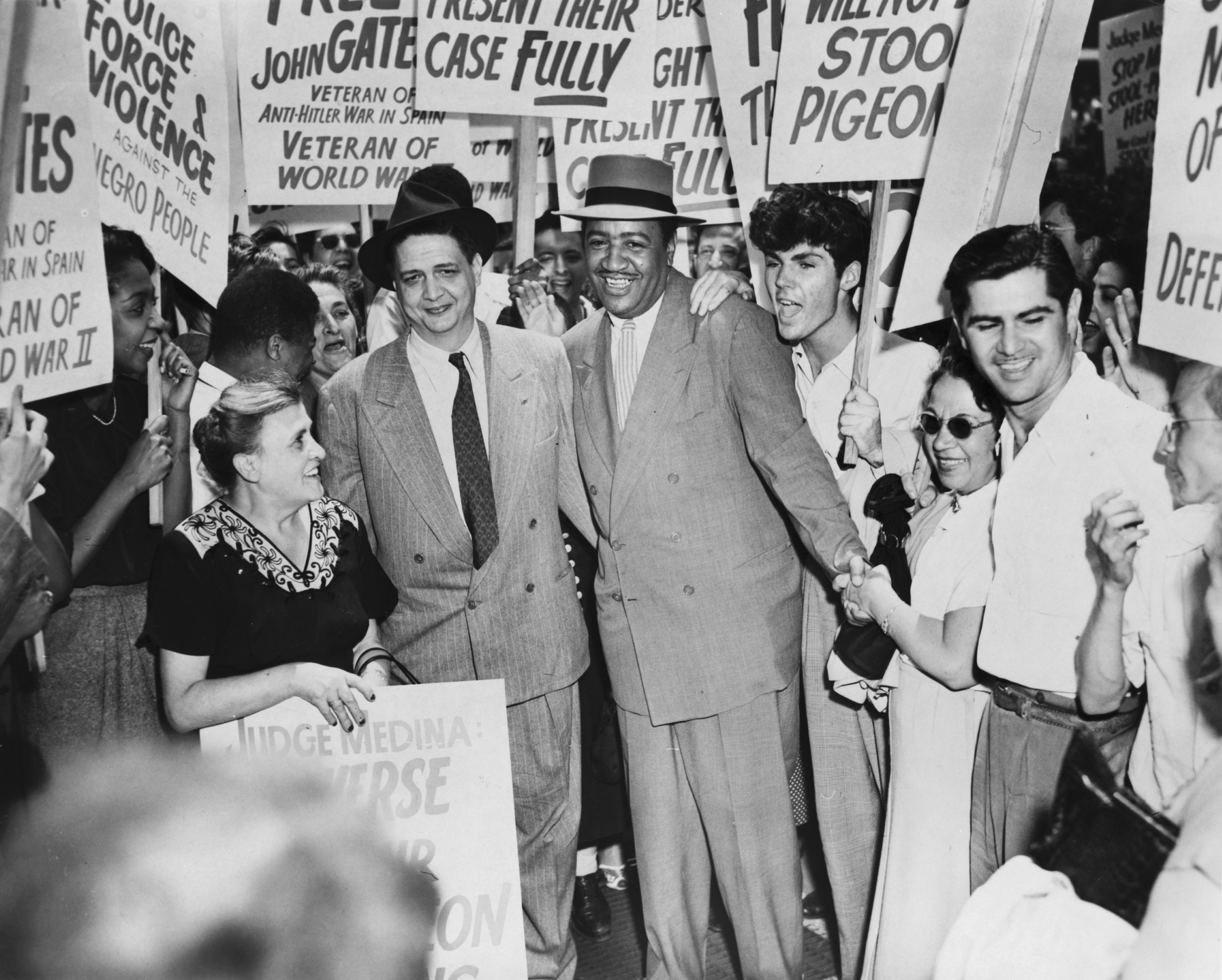
Thompson and Benjamin J. Davis Jr. leaving the Federal Courthouse in New York City during the Smith Act trials, 1949

After the war's end, Thompson was involved with the leadership of the Communist Party USA, and on August 19, 1945 was elected state chairman of the Communist Party of New York. He was the party's candidate for New York State Comptroller in the 1946 elections, earning roughly 2% of the vote.

In 1949, Thompson was convicted in the Foley Square trial, alongside the rest of the party leadership, for violating the Smith Act. He was sentenced to imprisonment for three years. After the Supreme Court affirmed his conviction, he absconded, and for this he was convicted of criminal contempt and ordered to serve an additional four-year sentence. While serving his sentence, Thompson was assaulted by a group of Serbian anti-communist Chetniks who had jumped ship in the United States, one of whom cracked Thompson's skull with a metal pipe while standing on a lunch line.

Thompson was finally released from prison on June 20, 1957 after federal judge Edmund Louis Palmieri decided that Thompson's remaining sentence may have been invalid, and that he was not a flight risk due to his injuries. Following his release, Thompson continued with the Communist Party, including organizing protests against the Vietnam War.

== Death ==
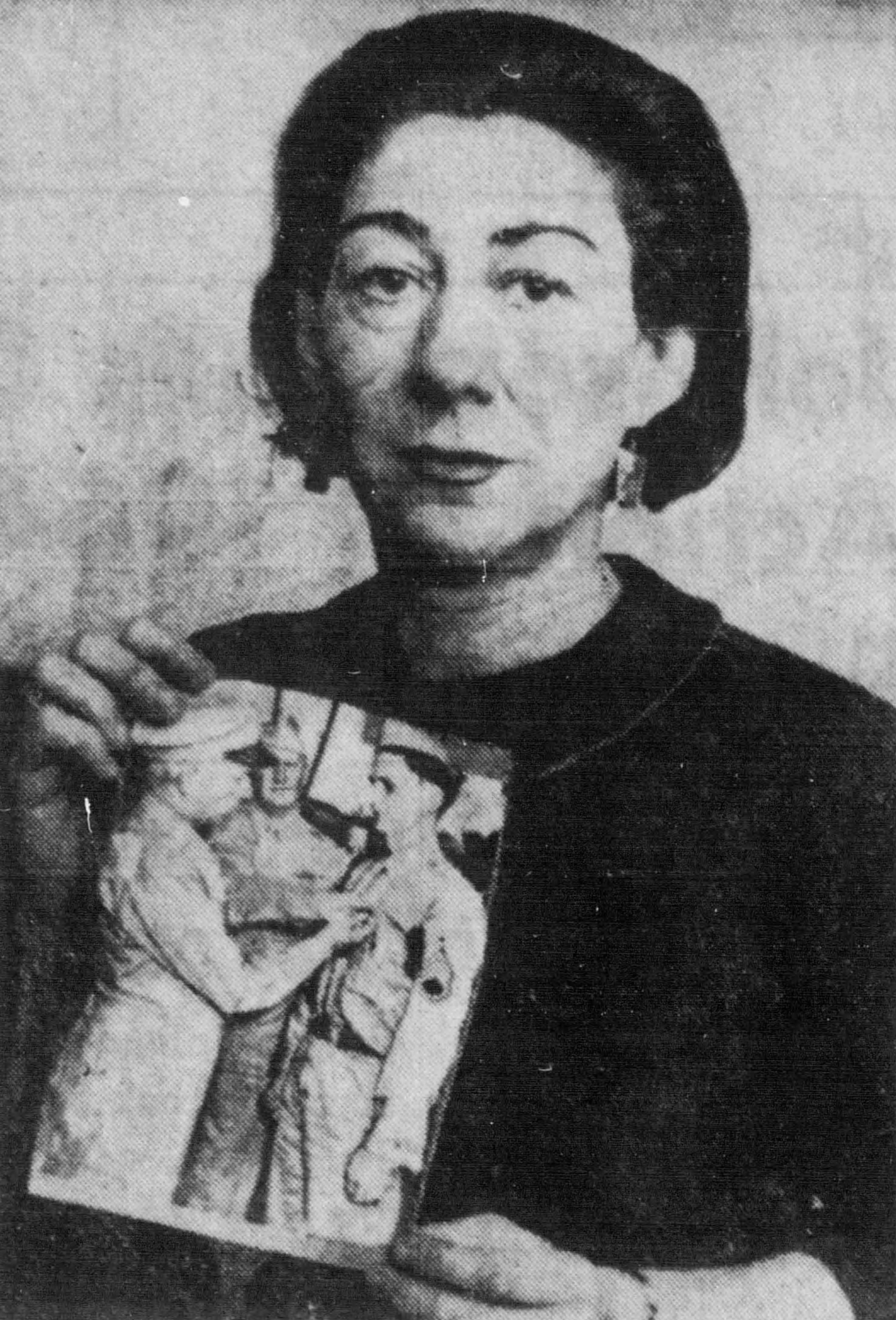
Thompson's wife Sylvia holds a picture of him receiving the Distinguished Service Cross, 1966

Thompson suffered a fatal heart attack in New York City on October 16, 1965. As controversial in death as in life, after initially granted burial at Arlington National Cemetery, his post-service activities led the Army, under pressure from Congress, to rescind its permission. Subsequently, after his wife Sylvia appealed the decision, the Army was ordered by the United States Court of Appeals for the District of Columbia Circuit to permit the interment.

== Legacy ==
Striking a dissenting chord days after his death, Pulitzer Prize-winning journalist Murray Kempton wrote:

And so, an American who was brave has been judged and disposed of by Americans who are cowards of the least excusable sort, cowards who have very little to fear. Yesterday the Army called Robert Thompson's widow and said that it would send his ashes wherever she wished. Wherever those ashes go, the glory of America goes with them.

== Works ==
- The Path of a Renegade: why Earl Browder was expelled from the Communist Party. New York: New Century. 1946.
