= John Williamson (communist) =

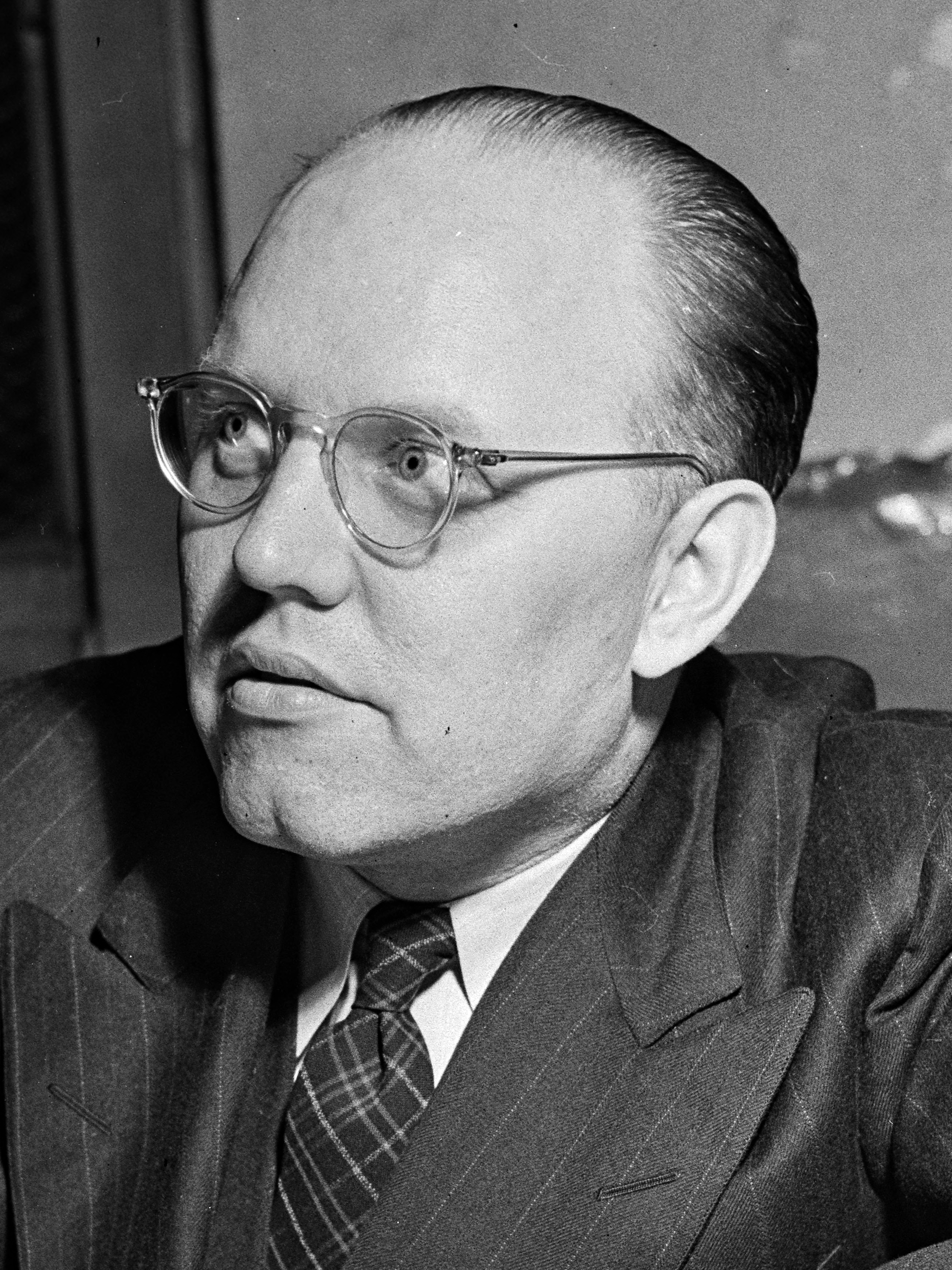
Williamson in 1944

John Williamson (1903–1974) was a Scottish-born radical best remembered as a top leader of the Communist youth movement in the 1920s in the United States.

== Biography ==
=== Early years ===
John Williamson was born on June 23, 1903, in Glasgow, Scotland, the son of a marine engineer who was severely injured in an accident at sea shortly after his child was born. A woodworker and shipbuilder by trade, Williamson only had 8 years of formal education, later attending high school at night. He came to the United States in July 1913, settling in Seattle.

=== Political career ===
Influenced by a Scottish co-worker, Williamson joined the Socialist Labor Party of America (SLP) in August 1918. He was the SLP's State Secretary for Washington from 1921 to 1922.

In his memoirs, Williamson recalls that he was deeply influenced by the move of the 1922 convention of the underground Communist Party of America to move towards legality and mass work and he joined that group in November or December 1922. He was active in the party's youth section, the Young Workers League (YWL) and was active as an organizer for the league in Seattle and was a member of the movement's "Legal Political Party," the Workers Party of America (WPA) from the time of its formation at the end of 1922.

Williamson was elected a delegate to the 2nd National Convention of the YWL in May 1923 and he made the long trip to New York for the gathering. He was there elected to the governing National Executive Committee of the YWL, moving to the headquarters city of Chicago after the convention at the NEC's request. The NEC named Williamson its "National Industrial Organizer," attempting to build a mass movement of young communists among unionized workers. During this interval of organizational poverty, Williamson worked at various day jobs to make ends meet, conducting his political activities at night. Williamson was a delegate of the YWL to the 3rd National Convention of the WPA at the end of 1923 and was there voted to be one of two delegates to the 4th World Congress of the Young Communist International in Moscow. Throughout the 1920s, Williamson was a loyalist of the Chicago-centered majority faction of Foster-Cannon-Lore.

After the 4th World Congress, Williamson returned home to Chicago, where he joined a 3-person Secretariat of the YWL, along with Martin Abern and Oliver Carlson. In 1924 he was made the YWL's representative to the YCI in Moscow. His time there was short, as he returned in September 1924 to assume the role of head of the YWL, a job which he maintained until August 1928, when he was replaced by Sam Darcy for factional reasons. After his removal as Secretary of the YWL, Williamson was again named Industrial Organizer for the group.

Williamson was a delegate to the 5th Enlarged Plenum of the Executive Committee of the Communist International (ECCI), held in April 1925.

In the fall of 1926, Williamson married Lenore Sarney, a Polish émigré who was active in the Young Communist movement. In 1930 their marriage came to an end, they remained friendly and Lenore remarried and subsequently settled in the Soviet Union.

From 1933 to 1940, Williamson was the CPUSA's District Organizer in Ohio, during which the membership of the district grew from 600 to 3,500.

In 1935 Williamson met Mae Kuperman and in March 1936 they married. They would go on to have two boys, Robert (Bob) and Neil, and would remain together until his death.

Williamson was a supporter of James P. Cannon's faction during the period in which Cannon and William Z. Foster were at odds, but he managed to remain in the Communist Party after Cannon's expulsion for Trotskyism in 1928. That same year he spent 9 months in the Soviet Union with his wife. He was released by the Young Communist League (successor to the YWL) for work in the adult party after the 5th National Convention of that organization, held in April 1929. From 1930, Williamson sat as a member of the governing Central Committee of the Communist Party.

=== Smith Act Conviction ===
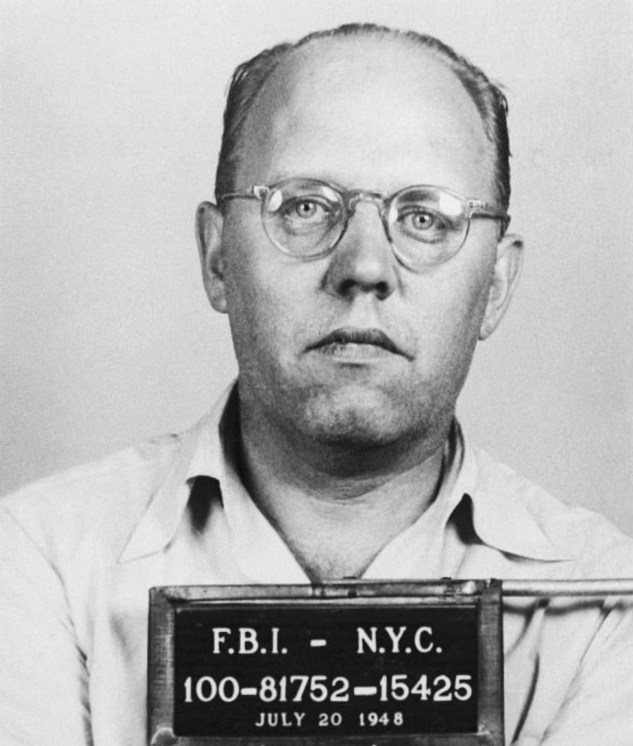
Williamson's FBI mugshot, 1948

In 1949, John Williamson was convicted under the Smith Act in an attempt by the US Department of Justice to "decapitate" the leadership of the Communist Party USA. He served five years in prison and was promptly deported to the UK upon his release in 1955. There he was active in the Communist Party of Great Britain.

Williamson suffered a serious heart attack in April 1963 and wrote a memoir of his life in the radical movement in 1965, a book eventually published by the Communist Party's International Publishers in 1969.

== Sources ==
- The Young Worker (1922-1927)
- The Worker/Daily Worker (1922-1938)
- Early American Marxism website ( http://www.marxisthistory.org )
