= Carl Winter (activist) =

American political official and newspaperman

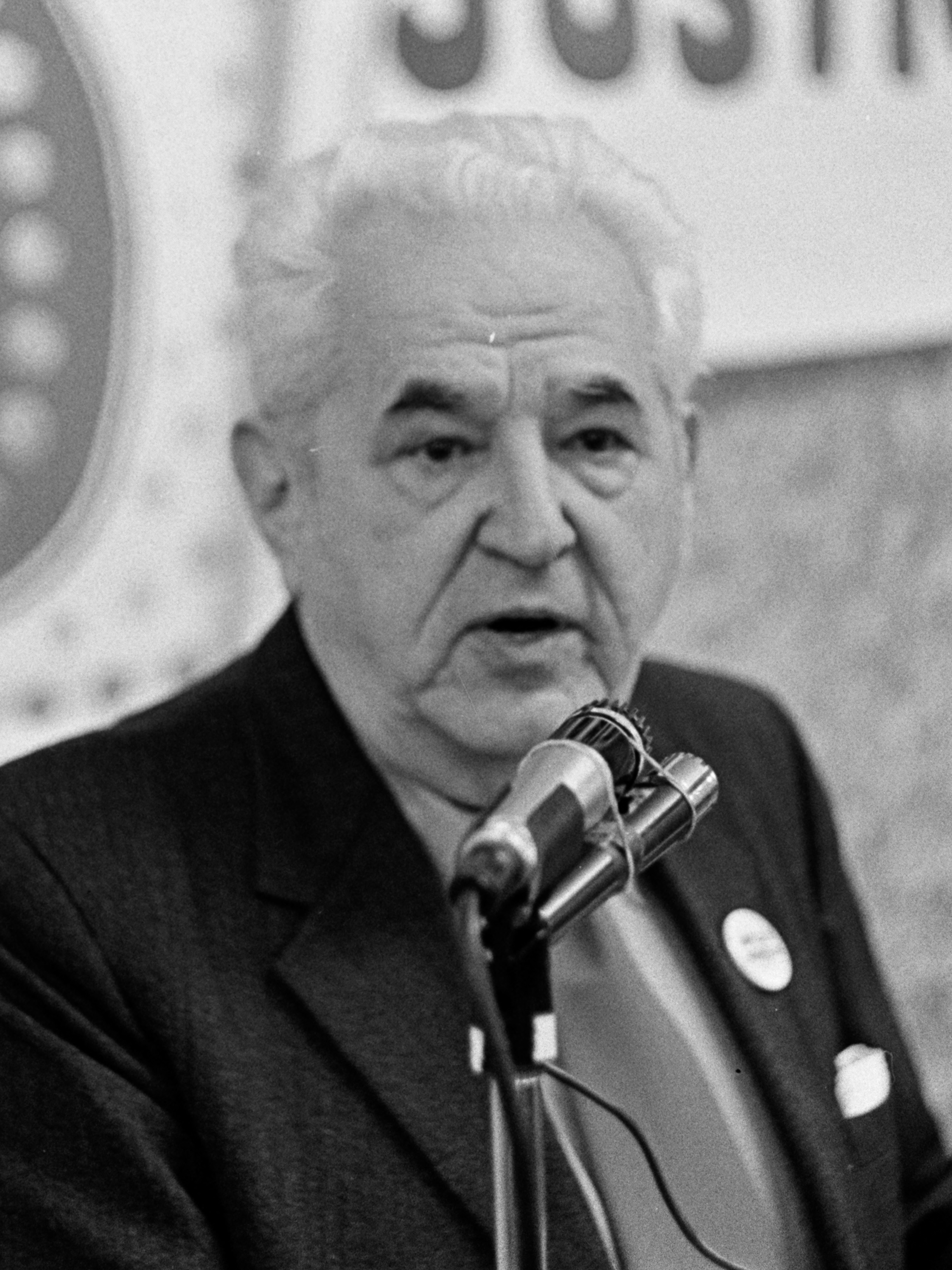
- Winter in 1974
- Born: Philip Carl Weisberg; September 25, 1906; Cleveland, Ohio, US
- Died: November 16, 1991 (aged 85); Manhattan, New York, US
- Occupations: Political official, newspaper editor
- Political party: Communist Party USA
- Spouse: Helen Wagenknecht (m. 1927)
- Relatives: Alfred Wagenknecht (father-in-law)

Carl Winter (born Philip Carl Weisberg; September 25, 1906 – November 16, 1991) was an American political official and newspaper editor. A member of the Communist Party USA, he was convicted under the Smith Act in 1949.

== Biography ==
Winter was born Philip Carl Weisberg on September 25, 1906, in Cleveland. He was the son of Jewish parents involved in radical politics, his father worked for the Jewish Daily Forward and his mother was a member of the communist party in Cleveland. Winter joined the Young Communist League in 1922 and became a member of the Communist Party in 1925. In 1927, Winter married Helen Allison Wagenknecht, another member of the Communist Party and the daughter of Alfred Wagenknecht. Winter served as the educational director of the Ohio Communist Party before he was made chairman of the Party in Michigan. He travelled to the Soviet Union eight times between 1933 and 1935.

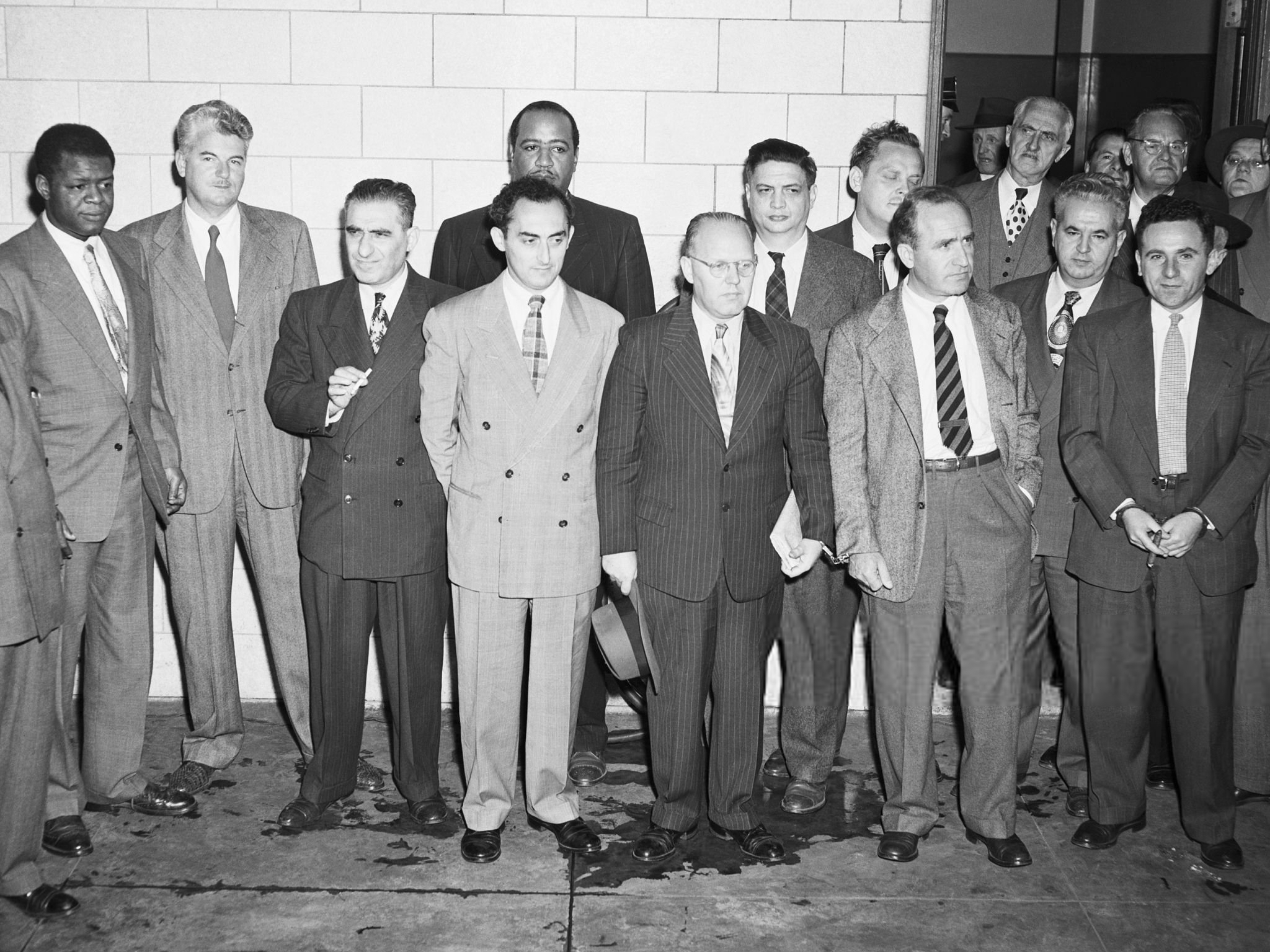
The Communists convicted in the Smith Act trials stand outside Foley Square Courthouse following the verdict, December 6, 1949. (L-R): Henry Winston, Eugene Dennis, Jack Stachel, Gil Green, Benjamin J. Davis Jr., John Williamson, Robert G. Thompson, Gus Hall, Irving Potash, Carl Winter and John Gates.

On July 20, 1948, Winter was indicted along with eleven other members of the Communist Party's national board and charged under the Smith Act with advocating for "the overthrow and destruction of the Government". He was arrested in Detroit while driving home with his wife. Winter had supported the government's use of the Smith Act in 1941 against members of the Trotskyist Socialist Workers Party. The Smith Act, according to Winter, would not be used to convict "genuine progressive individuals and organizations". George Crockett acted as Winter's defense lawyer during the trial. Winter and the other defendants received a sentence of five years in federal prison. Winter served his sentence at Lewisburg Penitentiary, where he discussed legal issues with fellow inmate Alger Hiss.

In 1966, Winter became the editor of The Worker, replacing James E. Jackson. Winter died on November 16, 1991, in Manhattan, from a heart attack, after giving a speech at the Party's Manhattan headquarters.
