= Unemployed Councils =

American Communist Party organization

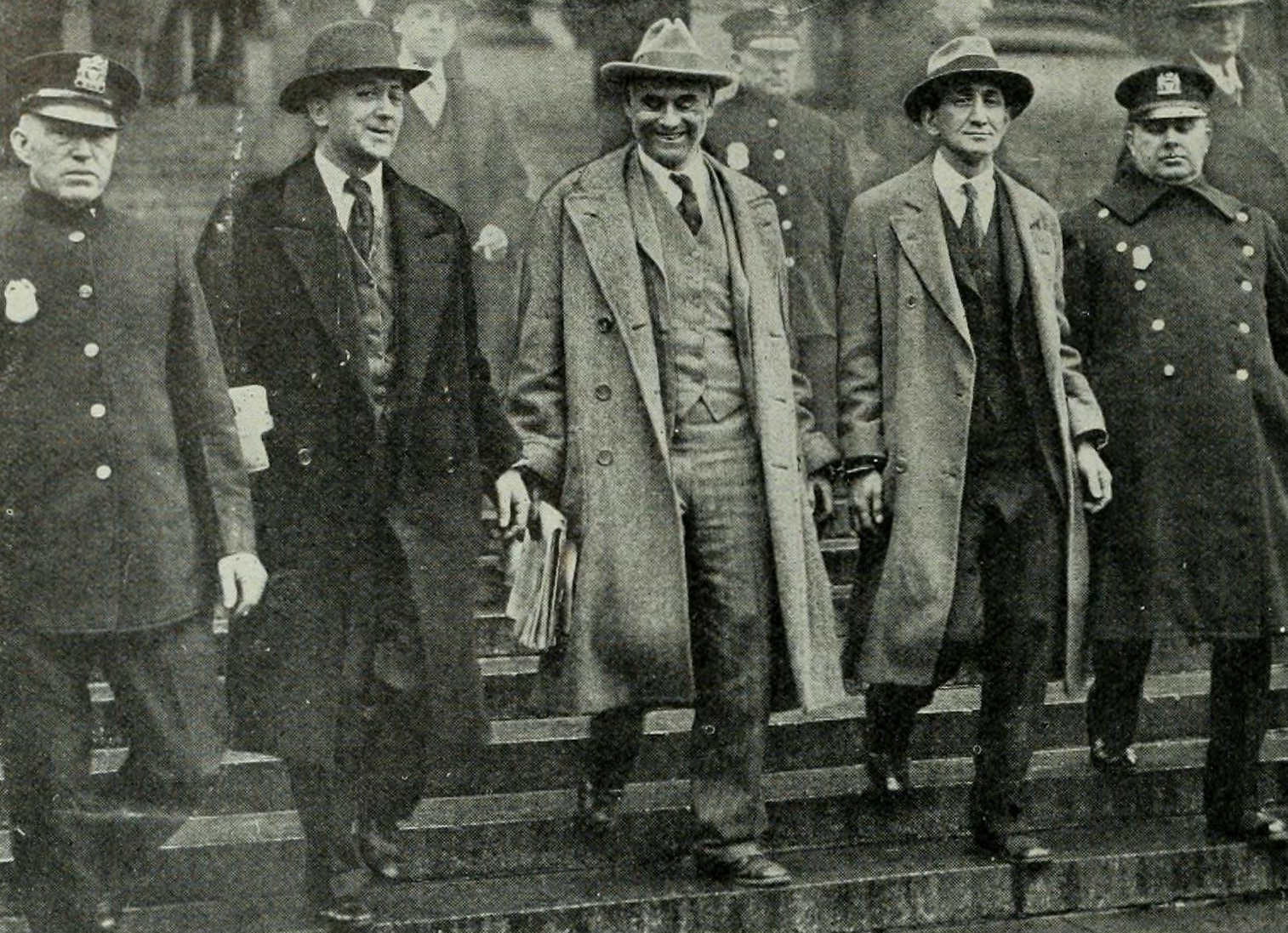
Unemployed Councils activists William Z. Foster, Robert Minor, and Israel Amter are led down the steps of the New York County Courthouse in Manhattan, New York following their arrests on International Unemployment Day, March 1930

The Unemployed Councils of the USA (UC) was a mass organization of the Communist Party, USA established in 1930 in an effort to organize and mobilize unemployed workers.

The UC was the organizational successor of the Unemployment Council of New York, a broad-based organization established by various trade unions in New York City in the spring of 1921, during the economic downturn which followed the termination of the First World War. The organization was dissolved through merger into the Workers Alliance of America, a parallel organization affiliated with the Socialist Party of America, in April 1936.

== Organizational history ==
=== Forerunners ===
In March 1921 a conference was held in New York City to address the unemployment question. This effort was widely supported by the local agencies of organized labor, with some 35 independent or associated locals of the American Federation of Labor and the Industrial Workers of the World sending delegates.

This Unemployment Conference of Greater New York elected Israel Amter, a member of the underground United Communist Party of America (UCP), as the secretary of a new organization, the Unemployment Council of New York.

Shortly after the conference, Amter was embroiled in a raid on UCP headquarters in New York City, in which he was arrested and charged with having committed the crime of criminal anarchy under New York state law. Following his release on bail, Amter threw himself into unemployment work, launching a small newspaper called Jobless and agitating on street corners to crowds of passersby.

Meetings of the Unemployment Council of New York were held at which the slogan "Fight and Live! Work or Compensation!" was advanced and an organizational agenda calling for unemployment relief, employment through public works, and the establishment of subsidized low-cost housing was cobbled together. The group attempted to expand at the local level through the establishment of neighborhood units called "Councils of Action." A national organization was envisioned, to be known as the Worker's Unemployed Council of America.

The Harding administration was moved to action on the issue by Secretary of Commerce Herbert Hoover, who drew up the blueprint for a President's Conference on Unemployment, which brought together leaders of industry and labor to further discuss the issue. The conference envisioned a city-based solution to the problem. By the end of 1921 some 209 localities had established Mayor's Committees on Unemployment to deal with the issue locally, making use of voluntarism.

This activity proved to be largely inadequate to the scope of the problem, with some minor progress made in some localities establishing emergency housing or setting up local employment bureaus to aid in matching up unemployed workers with prospective employers. These efforts did also undercut the radical New York movement as well, with the Communist-backed Unemployment Council of New York rapidly running out of organizational energy.

By the end of 1922 the post-war depression more or less had come to an end as the economy stabilized and businesses slowly began to hire more workers again to expand production. The New York-based Unemployed Council movement rapidly faded into obscurity with the improvement of business conditions.

Despite the failure of the 1921 launch of a mass movement of unemployed workers to gain traction, the Communist Party continued to pursue the issue, reiterating in 1923 its desire to bring about "the organization of groups of unemployed" in order to "force resolute action for the improvement of their position." Such proclaimed intentions were met with no practical success throughout the rest of the comparatively prosperous decade of the 1920s, however.

=== Depression era reorganization ===
The global crisis of capitalist economies remembered to history as the Great Depression which began in the 4th Quarter of 1929 accelerated the efforts of American Communists to organize unemployed workers. The party conducted its initial organizational work under the auspices of its radical trade union subsidiary, the Trade Union Unity League, advancing the slogan "Fight—Don't Starve!" and seeking to build a new network of so-called Unemployed Councils.

As one pioneer scholar of the topic has observed, these Unemployed Councils were conceived as an adaptation of the St. Petersburg Councils of the Unemployed, soviets of unemployed workers which emerged during the Russian Revolution of 1905 and which helped to organize opposition to the Tsarist regime of Nikolai II. The American Communists hoped to establish the Unemployed Council movement as a similar mechanism to turn isolated and atomized unemployed workers towards mass action in the advance of revolutionary objectives.

Paid organizers for the Unemployed Councils were set to work attempting to build the organization, searching out potential members in breadlines or queueing for soup kitchens, loitering at factory gates or near employment agency offices, or sitting around near cheap hotels. Organizers sought to form local Councils at the neighborhood level, sometimes down to the level of one or two large apartment buildings. In addition to the prevailing method of organizing on a geographic basis, in some cases Councils were alternatively organized on the basis of language, including, for example, Yiddish-language locals in New York City.

Historian Daniel Leab indicates that the early Unemployed Councils were far from a rigidly directed and monolithic movement:

"During this embryonic period the Councils existed on an extremely unstable basis. No real interaction existed between the separate components. Rarely did one Council act in unison with another. Indeed, the only points they had in common were their demands for more relief and more public works, their emphasis on the philosophy of class struggle, and their overall Communist sponsorship."

Over the course of three years, 1930-1932, the Unemployed Councils organized or participated in more than 700 protest actions in 138 cities and towns, nearly half occurring in 1932.

=== International Unemployment Day ===
The Unemployed Councils were thrust into the public limelight in connection with the coordinated mass demonstrations organized by the Communist Party on March 6, 1930, deemed International Day for Struggle against Worldwide Unemployment by the Communist International. Under the slogan "Work or Wages" hundreds of thousands of often ill-organized protestors turned out across the United States to protest against unemployment and to demand government relief. The network of Unemployed Councils was used by the Communist Party as one of the primary mechanisms for building attendance at these public demonstrations.

While the majority of these International Unemployment Day demonstrations passed without notable incident, violence erupted in several locals, including scores of injuries resulting from a full scale police riot in New York City, lesser police-protestor violence in Boston, and the use of tear gas to disrupt rallies in Washington, D.C., and Seattle. The demonstrations and so-called "riots" associated with them served to publicize the existence and activities of the Unemployed Councils, as the March 6 events gained widespread attention in the press as the first large scale protests resulting from the recent economic downturn.

The tiny Communist Party, which counted only about 10,000 members at this time, was anxious to capitalize upon the massive publicity generated as a result of the March 6 action and rapidly conducted a "First Preliminary Conference on Unemployment" in New York City on March 29–30, 1930. This gathering was addressed by a number of prominent Communist Party worthies, including head of the TUUL William Z. Foster, long time Unemployed Council activist Israel Amter, and editor of the Daily Worker Robert Minor. The gathering determined to call another convention, larger and more formal, to establish a new national organization which would exist in its own right, independent of Trade Union Unity League auspices. TUUL leader Pat Devine was elected National Secretary of the Unemployed Leagues on an interim basis. Divine's tenure as head of the UC was brief, as by the middle of May he had been "called away from the country by personal affairs" and replaced by George Siskind.

=== Establishment and early activity ===
On July 4 and 5, 1930 this founding convention met in Chicago. The gathering was attended by an impressive 1,320 delegates and established for the first time a new independent organization called the Unemployed Councils of the USA. The composition of the gathering was less astounding, however, with some 468 delegates hailing from the Communist Party or its youth section and another 723 connected with the party-sponsored TUUL. The gathering elected Communist Party leader Bill Mathieson as National Secretary of the new organization and named a governing National Committee of 38. Minor, Amter, and Foster — all of whom had begun serving 6-month jail terms in connection with the International Unemployment Day riot in New York City, were named as honorary members of the organization.

The primary organs of the new Unemployed Councils of the USA were again called "Committees of Action," these to be organized at the electoral precinct or ward level and combined to form a "City Unemployed Council." The City Unemployed Councils of smaller towns were to be additionally combined to form County Councils. City and County Councils were to elect delegates to state and national Unemployed Council bodies. No formal size requirements were set for Committees of Action until 1934, at which time a minimum of 25 members was established.

In August 1930 the Unemployed Councils attempted to give better form to their demands when the group's leaders composed a so-called "Workers Unemployment Insurance Bill." This legislative proposal called for the payment of $35 per week for each unemployed worker plus an additional $5 per week per dependent and the creation of a "National Unemployment Insurance Fund" to be generated through a tax on all property valued in excess of $25,000 and incomes of more than $5,000. These monies were to be distributed by a new Workers' Commission elected solely by employed and unemployed workers under the New York Conference's plan.

The tactic of mass demonstrations was continued, marked by an October 16, 1930, demonstration in front of City Hall in New York. Protestors demanded the city provide unemployment relief, chanting the party slogan "We Want Work or Wages" and singing the revolutionary anthem "The Internationale." The gathering of between 500 and 1,000 people was disbursed by mounted police, causing a melee to ensue in which plate glass windows of nearby businesses were shattered.

While protesters and police did battle in the street, inside City Hall a regularly scheduled meeting was being disrupted. The young secretary of the New York Unemployed Councils, Sam Nessin, took to the floor to call the chair of the meeting, Mayor Jimmy Walker, "a grafting politician and a crook." Nessin's aggressive accusation provoked the mayor to throw down his gavel and scream, "You dirty Red! In about two minutes I'll jump down there and smash you in the face!"

Police restored decorum to the meeting by forcibly ejecting Nessin and four Communist companions. The five were thrown down stairs before being beaten with nightsticks and blackjacks, leaving spatter on the walls and puddles of blood on the floor. Nessin was hospitalized from the assault, only to be formally charged later with "inciting to riot." Despite its one-sided violence the Communist gambit was not wholly unsuccessful, however, as the next day the New York City Board of Estimate suddenly appropriated $1 million for unemployment relief—the first time that such an expenditure had been made.

The Communist Party published its own program for work among the unemployed on December 9, 1930, issuing a set of 13 specific demands. These demands included a call for unemployment insurance providing for payment of full wages, the 7-hour workday, payment of emergency winter relief benefits, and diplomatic recognition by the United States government of the Soviet Union.

On December 19, 1930, a conference on unemployment relief was held in New York City, bringing together some 600 delegates, including Communist Party functionaries, members of local unemployed organizations and tenants' organizations, and representatives of the trade union movement. This gathering issued a convention call for a more formal New York Conference on Unemployment Relief, which was held on January 13, 1931.

The January 1931 gathering decided to descend upon Washington, D.C., with a massive petition demanding Congressional passage of a Federal Unemployment Insurance bill. A door-to-door canvassing campaign was launched to garner petition signatures.

=== Hunger marches ===
Another new organization was established under Communist Party auspices early in 1931, the Unemployed Committee for the National Hunger March, headquartered in the offices of the CP's trade union affiliate, the Trade Union Unity League in New York City. This paper organization was established to coordinate a "First National Hunger March" on the nation's capital to demand federal unemployment insurance and to keep Congress focused upon the unemployment issue. This march was also to demand the granting of emergency winter relief for the unemployed in the form of a lump-sum payment of $150 per unemployed worker, with an additional $50 for each dependent. Other programmatic objectives which the Communist organizers of the march sought to advance included enactment of a 7-hour workday, establishment of a union wage pay scale for unemployed workers, payment of a soldiers' bonus to veterans of World War I, and an end to discrimination against black American and foreign-born workers. The first National Hunger March took place in November 1931, as unemployed workers marched to the capitol from as far as Seattle, Portland, and San Francisco. They arrived in Washington, D.C., on December 6, 1931, and attempted to present their demands in the Senate and House chambers, but were not permitted to enter. Another National Hunger March took place again in November of the following year, this time with a total of 3,000 delegates from across the country arriving in the capitol to present their demands for winter relief and unemployment insurance to individual congressmen and senators.

=== Protests spread ===
In 1930, the CP and Unemployed Councils organized or participated in 107 protests in 47 cities, with multiple demonstrations in New York (16), Detroit, Chicago, and Philadelphia, Cleveland, and San Francisco, according to the Mapping American Social Movements Project. The following year the number of protests doubled and spread to 85 cities. And in 1932, 389 actions took place in 138 cities. In New York, protests were happening almost daily in that election year, 123 altogether. The Councils were also busy in Chicago (42), Detroit (28), Philadelphia (21), Cleveland (19), Toledo (18), Boston (16), Milwaukee (16).

This extraordinary surge of protests (the numbers do not include unemployed demonstrations organized by Socialists and other radicals) helped shape the political climate in 1932, with Herbert Hoover warning of Communist revolution and hoping to stir a red scare in his bid for re-election, while Democrats, no less worried about Communists, hoped that blaming Hoover would be decisive with the electorate.

=== Termination ===
From 1934 the international Communist movement followed a tactical line known as the Popular Front in which it sought to build political bridges with liberals as well as adherents of other left wing political parties in order to halt the spread of fascism. In accord with this line, the CPUSA sought to unite its Unemployed Councils organization with a parallel group associated with the Socialist Party, the Workers Alliance of America (WAA), and a third group organized by A.J. Muste and his Conference for Progressive Labor Action, known as the National Unemployed Leagues (UL).

On April 8, 1936, a unity convention was held in Washington, D.C. which formally merged the Communist-sponsored UC and the Muste-sponsored UL into the nominally Socialist WAA. As a condition of unification, the Communists were forced to surrender their old organizational name and to accept the Workers Alliance's title. The CPUSA was also forced to accept a minority of seats on the governing Executive Board of the organization, which retained Socialist David Lasser as President and Communist Herbert Benjamin as Organizational Secretary. Communist Party supporter Arnold Johnson would ultimately be elected to head the National Board of the new organization and headquarters were established in Washington, D.C.

=== Legacy ===
In the estimation of anti-Communist historian Eugene Lyons, the Unemployed Councils were an agglomeration of "over 20,000 adherents—loosely organized, often [themselves] out of sympathy with their communist spokesmen, yet a sufficient force for demonstration, hunger marches, and sheer nuisance activities." These individuals and the largely idealistic "earnest rank-and file communists" who led them are judged by Lyons to have been a "relative success" in moving issues affecting the unemployed to the national legislative agenda.

Lyons contends that "top-shelf party bureaucrats" undermined the grass roots organization of the unemployed by foisting Third Period slogans upon them such as "Down with Yankee Imperialism!" and "For a Soviet America!" As their movement dissipated, "the Communists realized their salvation lay in a merger" with the Socialist-backed Workers Alliance, headed by David Lasser. While the amalgamation of unemployed groups ostensibly involved the absorption of the Communist UC movement, in reality "the Communists took over the Alliance, which became just another Moscow front." Herbert Benjamin was installed as Secretary-Treasurer of the new organization, solidifying Communist control, and Lasser himself abandoned the Socialist Party for the Communists following a visit to Moscow, Lyons indicates.

In the book Poor People's Movements: Why They Succeed, How They Fail, Frances Fox Piven and Richard Cloward argue that the Unemployed Councils and their radical tactics ultimately helped many people suffering in the Great Depression. In organizing mass resistance to evictions, the Unemployed Councils would lead small bands of unemployed to use "strong arm tactics" to prevent authorities from tossing people and their belongings into the streets, which resulted in 77,000 evicted people being restored to their homes in New York City alone. They also organized rent strikes and helped the newly unemployed apply for relief aid from the government. Noam Chomsky contends that during the Great Depression "the Communist Party was the spearhead for labor and civil rights organizing."

== See also ==
- Workers Alliance of America

== Conventions ==
- First Preliminary National Conference on Unemployment * NYC * March 29–30, 1930 * Attended by 213 delegates from 13 states. Main speakers William Z. Foster, Israel Amter, Robert Minor, John Schimes.
- Founding Convention * Chicago * July 4–5, 1930 * Attended by 1,320 delegates. Transformed TUUL-sponsored group into the new national organization "Unemployed Councils of the USA."
- Conference on Unemployment Relief * NYC * Dec. 19, 1930 * Attended by 600 delegates.
- New York Conference on Unemployment Relief * NYC * Jan. 13, 1931. *
