= National Campaign Committee for Unemployment Insurance =

The National Campaign Committee for Unemployment Insurance (NCCUI) was a mass organization of the Communist Party USA established in October 1930 in an effort to build a radical movement around the issue of unemployment insurance, thereby advancing the American Communist Party's cause. Headed by Alfred Wagenknecht, the NCCUI gathered a claimed 1.4 million petition signatures, which were presented to United States Congress amidst a heightened police presence on February 10, 1931. Three of the group's 140 delegates were expelled from the gallery of the U.S. Senate on that date for interrupting the debate.

== Organizational history ==
With the deepening of the Great Depression in 1930, the Communist International (Comintern) based in Moscow began to see millions of unemployed workers around the world as a fertile field for the sowing of revolutionary ideas. Directives were issued to the member parties of the Comintern instructing that efforts be made for the organization of the unemployed and to attempt to build a mass movement around the demand for unemployment insurance.

To this end, the decision was made to form a new auxiliary of the Communist Party USA was established to direct the unemployment insurance campaign. On November 11, 1930, representatives of a number of the Communist Party's so-called "mass organizations" (pejoratively known as "front groups") were assembled at a conference held in New York City to establish a new organization known as the National Campaign Committee for Unemployment Insurance. Among those party organizations represented at this gathering were the Communist Party's Unemployed Councils, its newly established fraternal organization the International Workers Order, and the party's radical trade union organization, the Trade Union Unity League.

The gathering determined to launch a petition drive aimed at bringing the signatures of at least 1 million Americans to Congress in an effort to force the adoption of a program of unemployment insurance in the United States. Veteran Communist Party functionary Alfred Wagenknecht was placed in charge of the campaign.

On February 10, 1931, the fruits of the NCCUI's efforts, petitions said to contain some 1.4 million signatures, were brought to Washington, DC by a group of 140 of the organization's active supporters, headed by Wagenknecht. The United States Capitol Police were called out in force in anticipation of the arrival of the Communists.

Three members of the NCCUI were ultimately expelled from the gallery of the U.S. Senate for interrupting debate. After presenting their petitions the group quietly departed the capitol on the next day, with Wagenknecht declaring, "Next time we will not come with signatures. We will come with organized mass power."

The U.S. House of Representatives took up the matter of Communism in America during its floor debate on February 11 with conservatives opining the desirability of deporting alien radicals from America, while progressives such as Rep. Fiorello LaGuardia of New York declaring that Congress should indeed pass some sort of unemployment insurance legislation as a way of undercutting revolutionary sentiment.

== See also ==
- International Unemployment Day (March 6, 1930)
