= Israel Amter =

American Marxist politician (1881–1954)

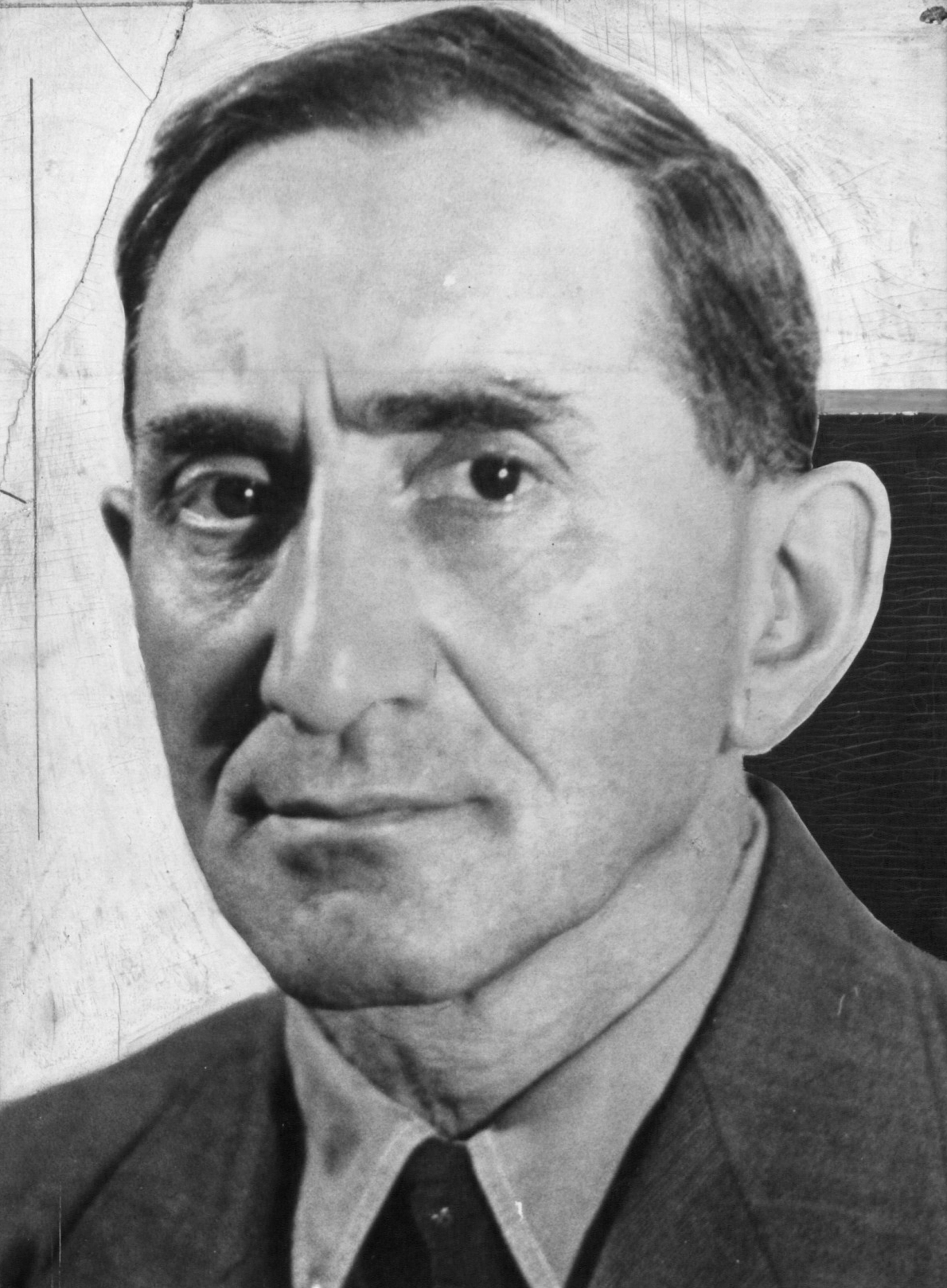
- Amter c. 1937
- Born: March 26, 1881; Denver, Colorado, U.S.
- Died: November 24, 1954 (aged 73); New York City, U.S.
- Education: Leipzig Conservatory
- Political party: Communist
- Other political affiliations: Socialist (1901–1903, 1917–1919); SPD (1903–1914)
- Spouse: Sadie Van Veen (m. 1902)
- Children: 2

Israel Amter (March 26, 1881 – November 24, 1954) was an American Marxist politician and founding member of the Communist Party USA (CPUSA). Amter is best remembered as one of the Communist Party leaders jailed in conjunction with the International Unemployment Day Riot of 1930 and as a frequent candidate for public office, including three runs for Governor of New York.

== Early life ==
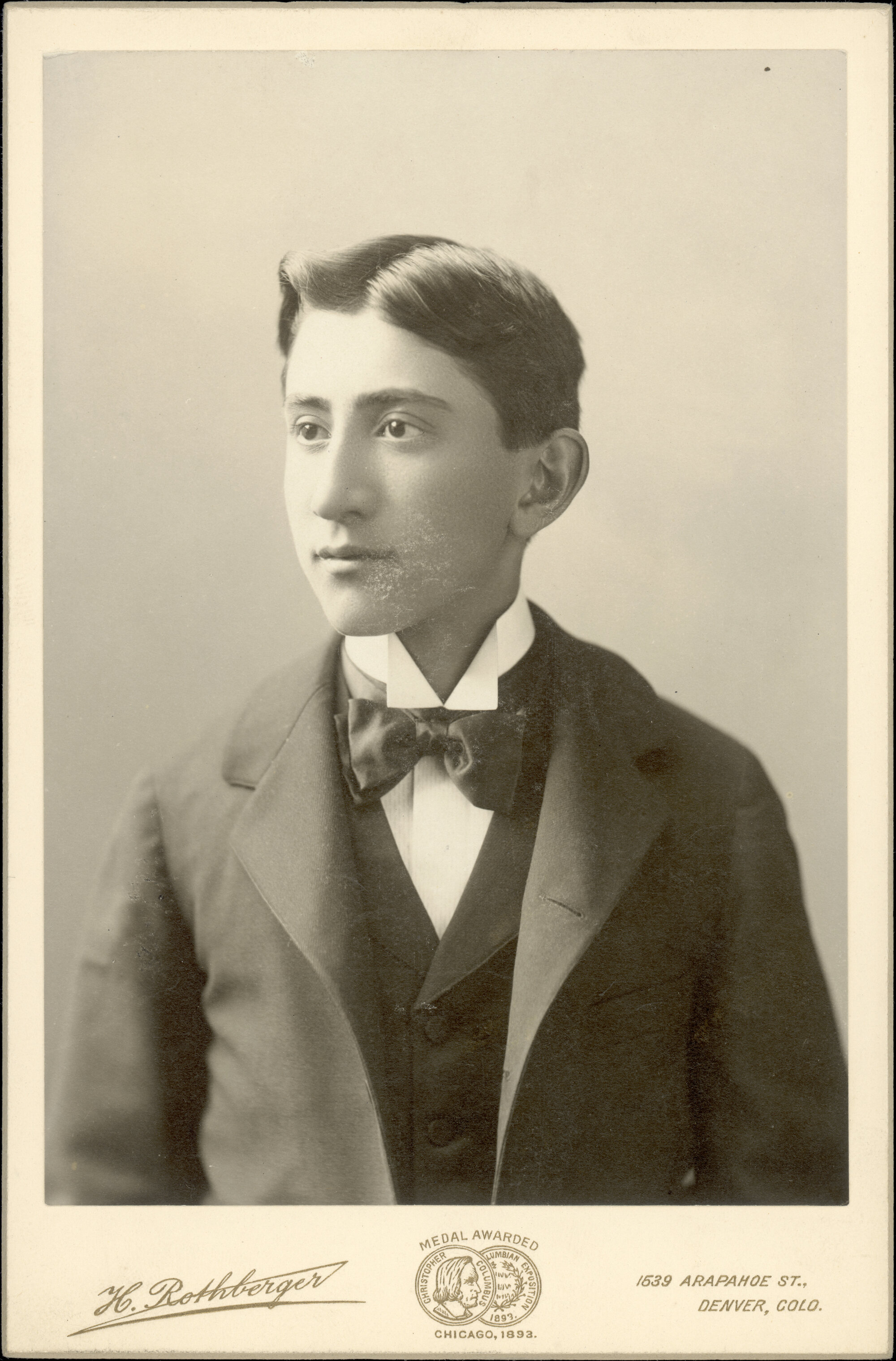
Amter's Denver High School senior photo, 1897

Israel Amter was born March 26, 1881, in Denver, Colorado, to Jewish-Hungarian parents. His father, Marks Amter, was originally from Riga, Latvia, then part of the Russian Empire. Growing up, Amter did not receive any sort of Jewish education, and most of his friends were gentiles. He received a musical education and studied the piano, which he would later abandon after entering politics.

After marrying Sadie Van Veen, a Communist activist in her own right, in 1902, they had met at one of his piano concerts two years prior. They had two children together.

== Career ==
=== Communist Party ===
In 1901, Amter became a member of the Socialist Party of America (SPA) before moving to Germany in 1903. While in Germany he edited the German Export Review and became a member of the Social Democratic Party. He also studied music at the Leipzig Conservatory where in 1912 he created an unperformed opera called Winona. Influenced by the Indianist movement, the story concerns a romance between a United States Army Officer and a Native American woman known as Winona. Amter returned to the United States when Germany entered World War I.

In 1917 Amter rejoined the Socialist Party and was an active member of the Left Wing Section when it emerged in 1919. He was a founding member of the Communist Party of America at its first convention in September 1919. Amter seems to have followed the faction around, C.E. Ruthenberg out of the party in April 1920, becoming a member of the United Communist Party (UCP). In November 1920 he was named to the editorial committee of the UCP.

On April 29, 1921, Amter was arrested along with three others in a raid on the UCP's covert headquarters in New York by New York bomb squad detectives and Department of Justice agents. Amter was charged in the incident and released on bail.

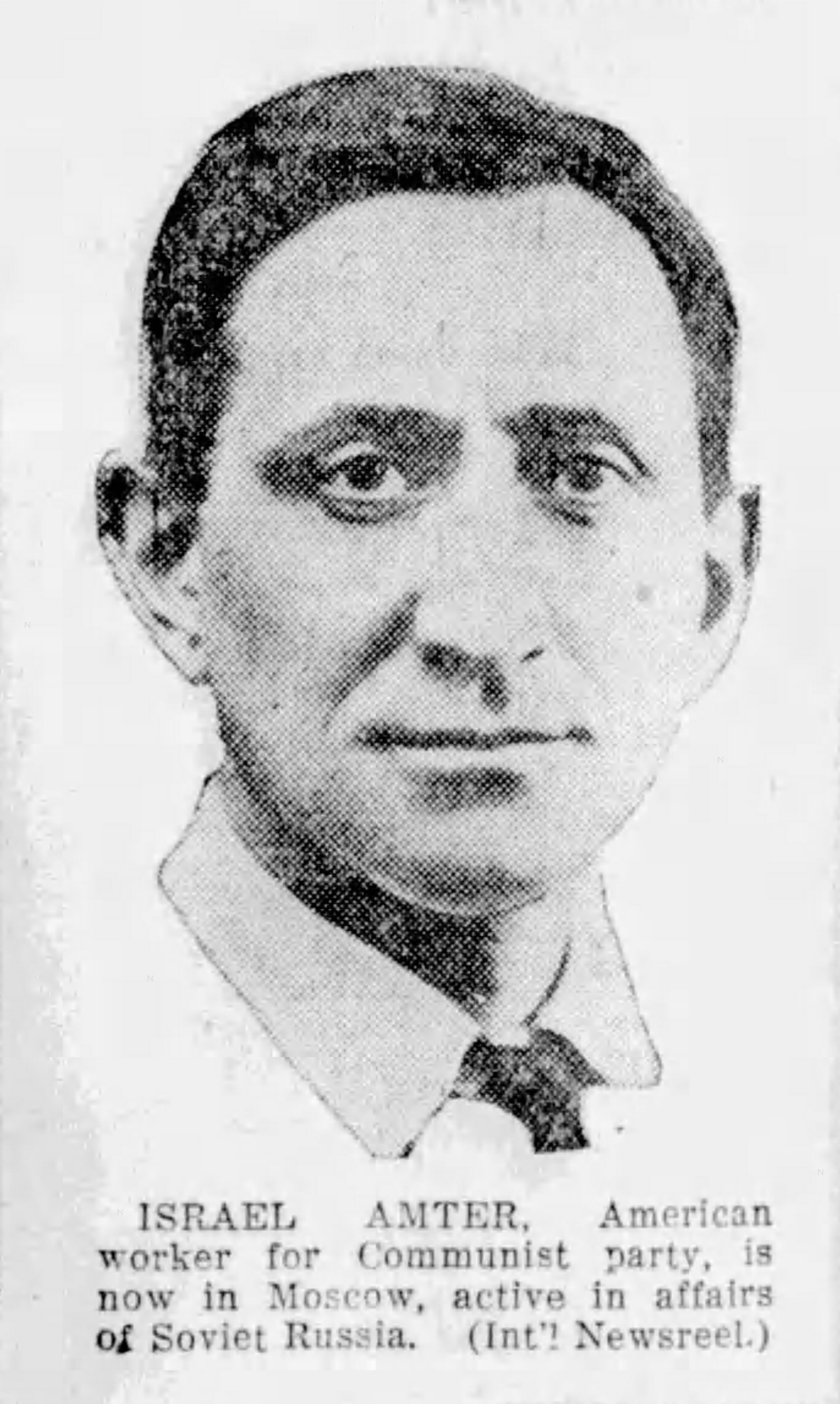
Amter in 1924

Amter was a member of the governing Central Executive Committee of the unified Communist Party of America from 1922. He was an adherent of the system of underground party organization and was factionally associated with Abram Jakira, L.E. Katterfeld, Alfred Wagenknecht, and Edward Lindgren in this period in a tendency commonly and somewhat derisively known as the "Goose Caucus." Although this faction nominally won the day at the ill-fated 1922 Bridgman Convention, assuring the preservation of the underground party, in actuality the victory was Pyrrhic; in the competition between the parallel above ground and underground party apparatuses, the legal Workers Party of America (WPA) headed by C.E. Ruthenberg grew steadily, while the underground organization atrophied, to be terminated in 1923. Underground functions continued to be performed by a narrow circle within the Communist organization after the demise of the formal underground CPA organization, although the parallel party apparatus was liquidated at a one-day convention held in New York City on April 7, 1923.

Amter was the representative of the WPA to the Communist International (Comintern) from 1923 to 1924 and served as the ECCI referent [mediator] on questions of the English and American parties. He was a delegate to the 3rd Enlarged Plenum of ECCI and was a delegate to the 5th World Congress of the Communist International in 1924. During the factional struggles of the middle 1920s, Amter seems to have cast his lot with the Ruthenberg-Lovestone faction. He was the Cleveland District Organizer of the Communist (Workers) Party in 1927.

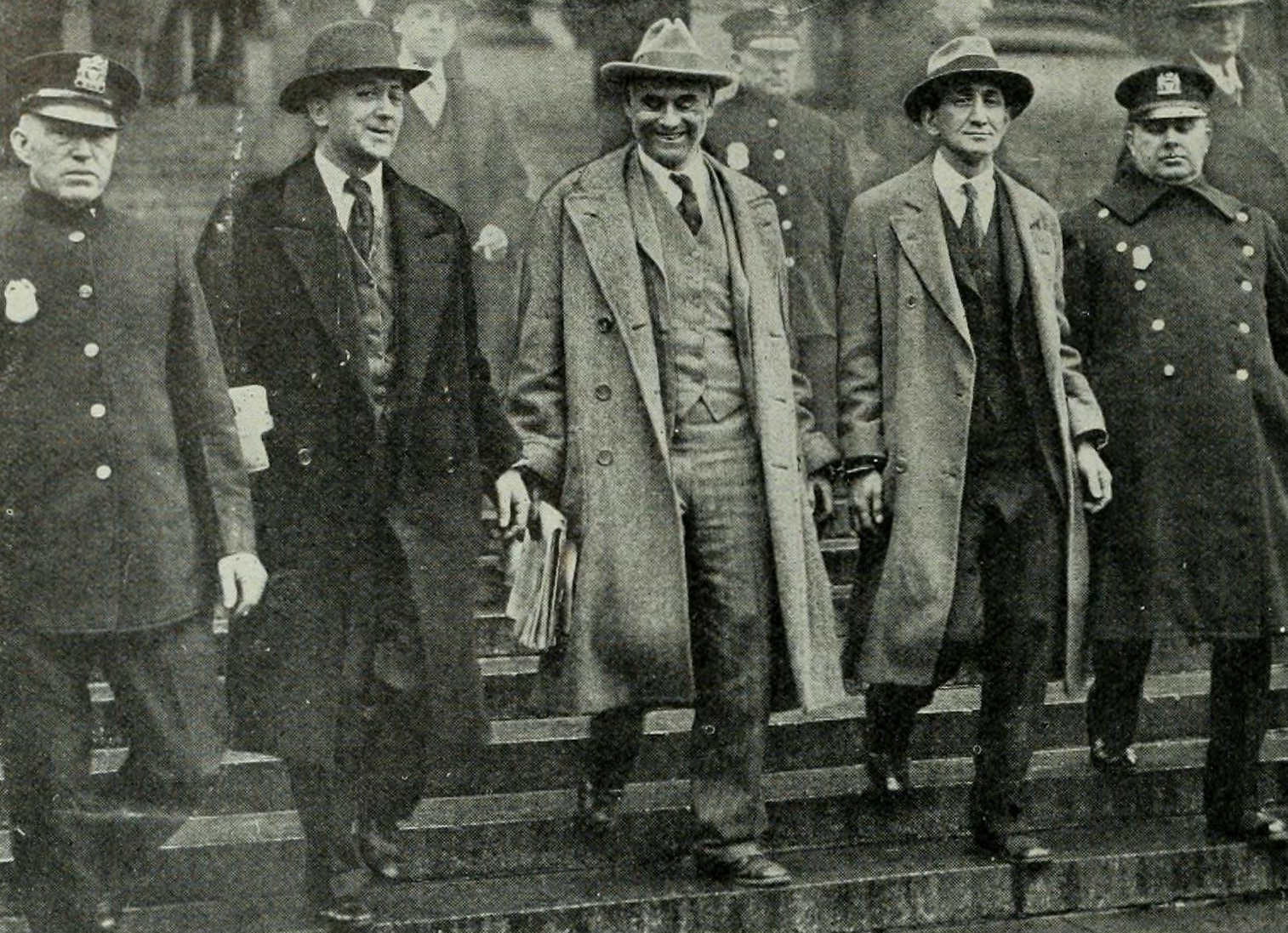
Communist Party leaders William Z. Foster, Robert Minor, and Israel Amter are led down the steps of the New York County Courthouse in Manhattan, New York following their arrests on International Unemployment Day, March 1930

During the early years of the Great Depression, Amter was active in the Communist Party's Unemployed Councils movement and was arrested in New York City on March 6, 1930, along with William Z. Foster and Robert Minor in connection with the International Unemployment Day demonstration. Amter was ultimately sentenced on April 21, 1930, to a term of "6 months to 3 years" in connection with the riot which had ensued. He was released from jail on October 21, 1930.

In the 1940s, Amter was a member of state secretariat of the CPUSA. His colleagues included Si Gerson and Bella Dodd.

=== Communist politics ===
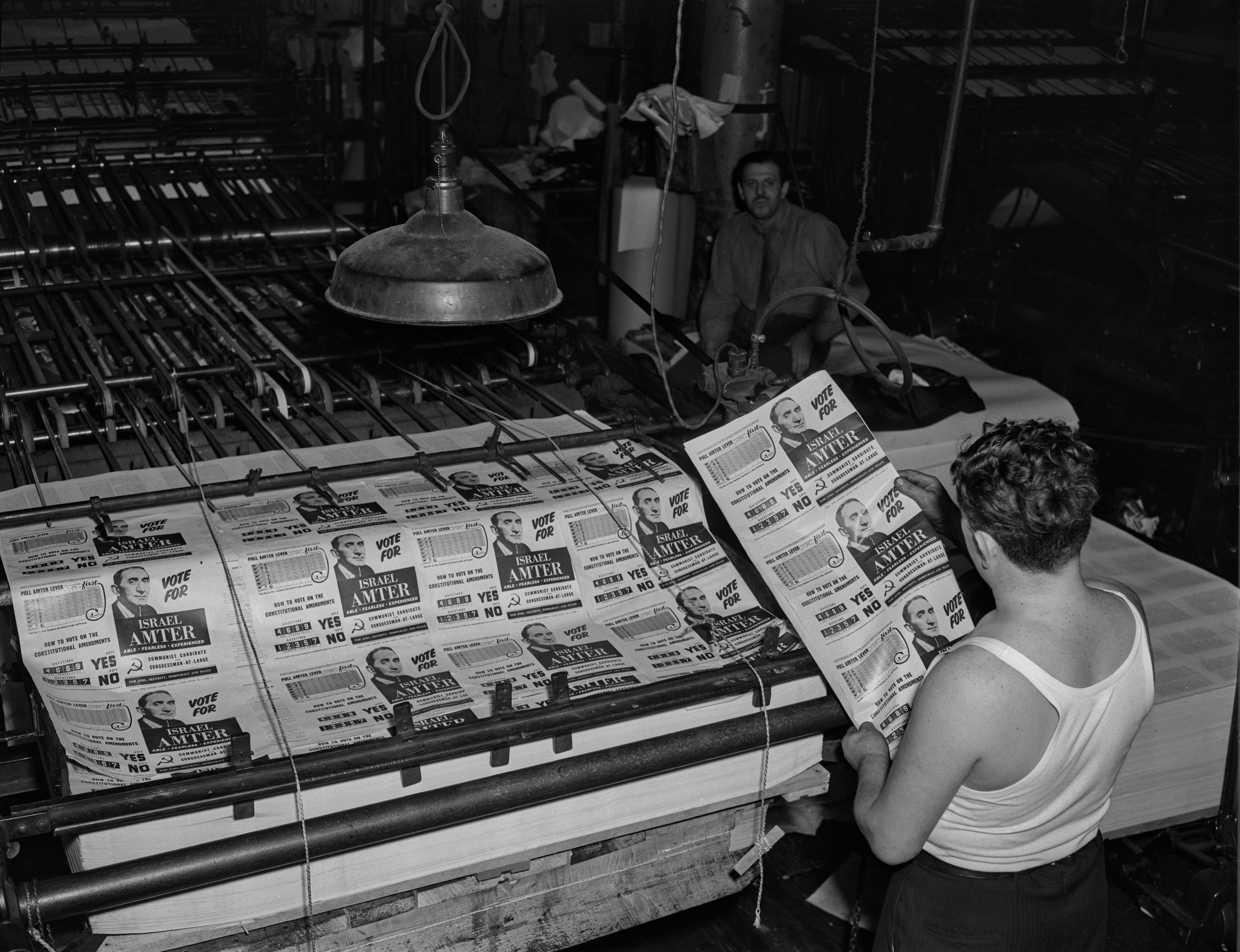
Amter for Congress campaign literature comes off the press, 1938

Amter was a frequent candidate of the Communist Party for various political offices. The first came in 1928 when he ran for U.S. Senate in Ohio under the Workers Party ticket. He managed to receive 2,062 votes, about .09% of the popular vote. He then moved to New York, where he ran for Congress in 1930 and 1938. He also ran for Manhattan Borough President in 1931 and 1933, for President of the Board of Aldermen in 1936, for New York City Council in 1937, 1939, and 1941, and for Governor of New York in 1932, (Note: Amter's running mate was Henry Shepard; Amter received 26,407, or 0.56%, of the popular vote in 1932.) 1934, (Note: Amter's running mate was William J. Burroughs; Amter received 45,878 votes, 1.21% of the ballots cast.) and 1942. (Note: Amter had no running mate, Frank Herron had been nominated but withdrew; Amter received 45,220 votes, or 1.1 % of the ballots cast.) He was also a candidate for U.S. Senate in 1940, but in the last week of the election the New York Court of Appeals rejected the ballot petitions of the Communist Party's statewide candidates, removing them from the race.

== Later life and death ==
Amter developed Parkinson's disease in the 1940s. He was indicted under the Smith Act prosecutions of the Communist Party's leadership in 1951 but was severed from the case due to his illness. Amter died at Columbus Hospital in Manhattan, New York on November 24, 1954.

== Legacy ==
Amter's son Don was featured in Red Diapers: Growing Up in the Communist Left, where he reflected on his Communist upbringing and how the Khrushchev report changed his perception of it. He later joined the Democratic Socialists of America.

Allen Ginsberg mentions Amter by name in the poem "America":

America when I was seven momma took me to Communist Cell meetings they sold us garbanzos a handful per ticket a ticket costs a nickel and the speeches were free everybody was angelic and sentimental about the workers it was all so sincere you have no idea what a good thing the party was in 1935 Scott Nearing was a grand old man a real mensch Mother Bloor made me cry I once saw Israel Amter plain. Everybody must have been a spy."

== Works ==
- Amter, I., Mirovoe osvoboditelʹnoe dvizhenie negrov [The World Liberation Movement of Negoes]. Moscow: Gosizdat, 1925.
- Silver, A. and Amter, Israel, "Proletarian Dictatorship" or Industrial Unionism: Silver-Amter Debate. New York: New York Labor News, 1927.
- Amter, I., Is the Socialist Party a Party of the Workers? New York: Communist Party, n.d. [c. 1932].
- Amter, I., Make the Democrats Keep Their Promises. New York: National Committee of Unemployed Councils, 1932.
- Amter, I., Industrial Slavery — Roosevelt's "New Deal." New York: Workers Library Publishers, 1933.
- Amter, I., The March Against Hunger. New York: Workers Library Publishers, 1933.
- Amter, I., Why the Workers' Unemployment Insurance Bill? How It Can Be Won. New York: Workers Library Publishers, 1934.
- Amter, I., Social Security in a Soviet America. New York: Workers Library Publishers, 1935.
- Amter, I., Working Class Unity or Fascism? New York: New York District, Communist Party, 1935.
- Amter, I., A Labor Party for New York Workers. New York: New York District, Communist Party, 1935.
- Amter, I., Youth and the Struggle for Unemployment and Social Insurance. New York: Youth Publishers, n.d. [c. 1935].
- Amter, I. and Pius, Pope, To His Holiness, Pope Pius XI, Vatican, Rome, Italy. New York: New York District, Communist Party, n.d. [c. 1936].
- Krumbein, Charles and Amter, Israel, Dollars for Democracy. New York: New York State Communist Party, n.d. [c. 1936].
- Amter, I., The Truth About the Communists. New York: Workers Library Publishers, n.d. [c. 1939].
- Amter, I., May Day 1939: For Labor Unity, For Social and National Security. New York: Workers Library Publishers, 1939.
- Amter, I., A Program for Manhattan's Millions. New York: New York County Committee CPUSA, n.d. [1939].
- Amter, I., Truth About Finland. New York: New York State Committee, Communist Party, n.d. [1939].
- Amter, I., Americans All! New York: Workers Library Publishers, n.d. [1940].
- Amter, I., May Day 1941. New York: Workers Library Publishers, 1941.
- Amter, I., New York Needs Communists in the City Council. New York: New York County Committee CPUSA, n.d. [c. 1941].
- Browder, Earl; Foster, William Z.; Amter, I.; Weiss, Max, et al., Speed the Second Front. New York: Workers Library Publishers, 1942.
- Amter, I., America's Fate Hangs in the Balance! Open a Second Front at Once! New York: New York State Campaign Committee, 1942.
