= Helen Winter =

American political activist and organizer (1908–2001)

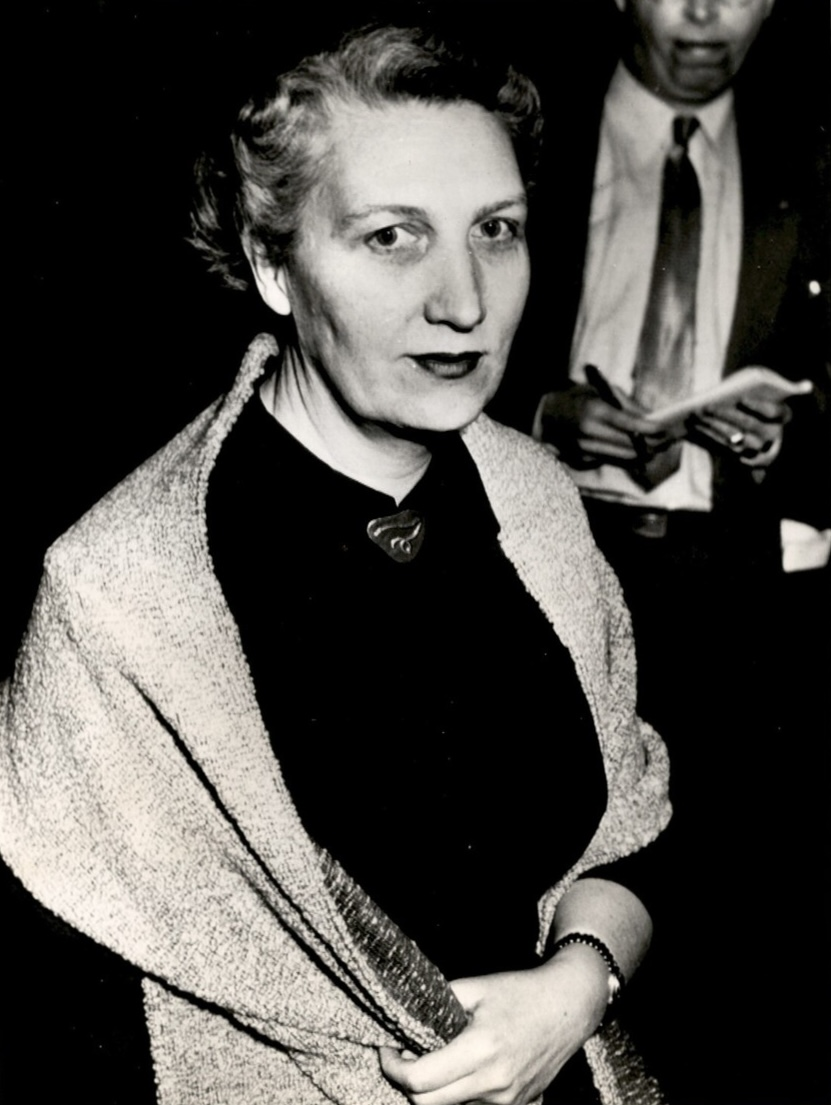
- Winter on February 16, 1954 after her initial conviction on violating the Smith Act
- Born: Helen Allison Wagenknecht; 1908; Seattle, Washington, US
- Died: December 13, 2001 (aged 92–93); Detroit, Michigan, US
- Occupations: Political activist, organizer
- Political party: Communist Party USA
- Spouse: Carl Winter (m. 1927; died 1991)
- Father: Alfred Wagenknecht

Helen Allison Winter (born Helen Allison Wagenknecht; 1908 – December 13, 2001) was an American political activist and organizer. A member of the Communist Party USA, she was the daughter of Alfred Wagenknecht and the wife of Carl Winter.

== Biography ==
Winter was born in 1908, in Seattle. A red diaper baby, her parents were Marxist activists Alfred Wagenknecht and Hortense Allison. She grew up in Cleveland, where her family moved to when she was five years old. During World War I, her father was imprisoned in Canton due to being a conscientious objector. Throughout her childhood, she was involved in a socialist church and helped deliver copies of a socialist newspaper, The Ohio Socialist. She joined the Young Communist League USA, followed by the Communist Party USA (CPUSA).

During the 1926 Passaic textile strike, Winter worked at the union relief office, which her father was the organizer of. In 1927, she married fellow Communist Carl Winter, who she met in her senior year of high school. In the late 1920s, she and her husband moved to New York City. There, she worked as an organizer for the Trade Union Unity League. She was also a founding member of the Office and Professional Employees International Union. She continued her organizing through the Great Depression in the United States, and during that time also worked as a journalist for the Daily Worker.

During the rise of fascism in Europe, Winter and her husband spent the mid-1930s on the continent fighting it. In the 1940s, she was active between Cleveland and Minneapolis, and while in the latter unsuccessfully ran for the Minneapolis Library Board and ran under the slogan "books, not bullets". They moved to Los Angeles in the early 1940s, and in 1942, their only child, daughter Michele, was born. They moved to Detroit c. 1945.

During the Smith Act trials of Communist Party leaders, Carl Winter was imprisoned. She worked with the Smith Act Families Committee, whch provided support to families of those also arrested under the Smith Act. Winter was also charged under the Smith Act, and she had to attend her trial on a stretcher due to being afflicted with phlebitis. She was covered by a red blanket during the trial, which the judge took to be communist symbolism, for which he ordered its removal and ordered the trial into recess. She was never convicted, as her case was appealed to the Supreme Court of the United States as part of Yates v. United States.

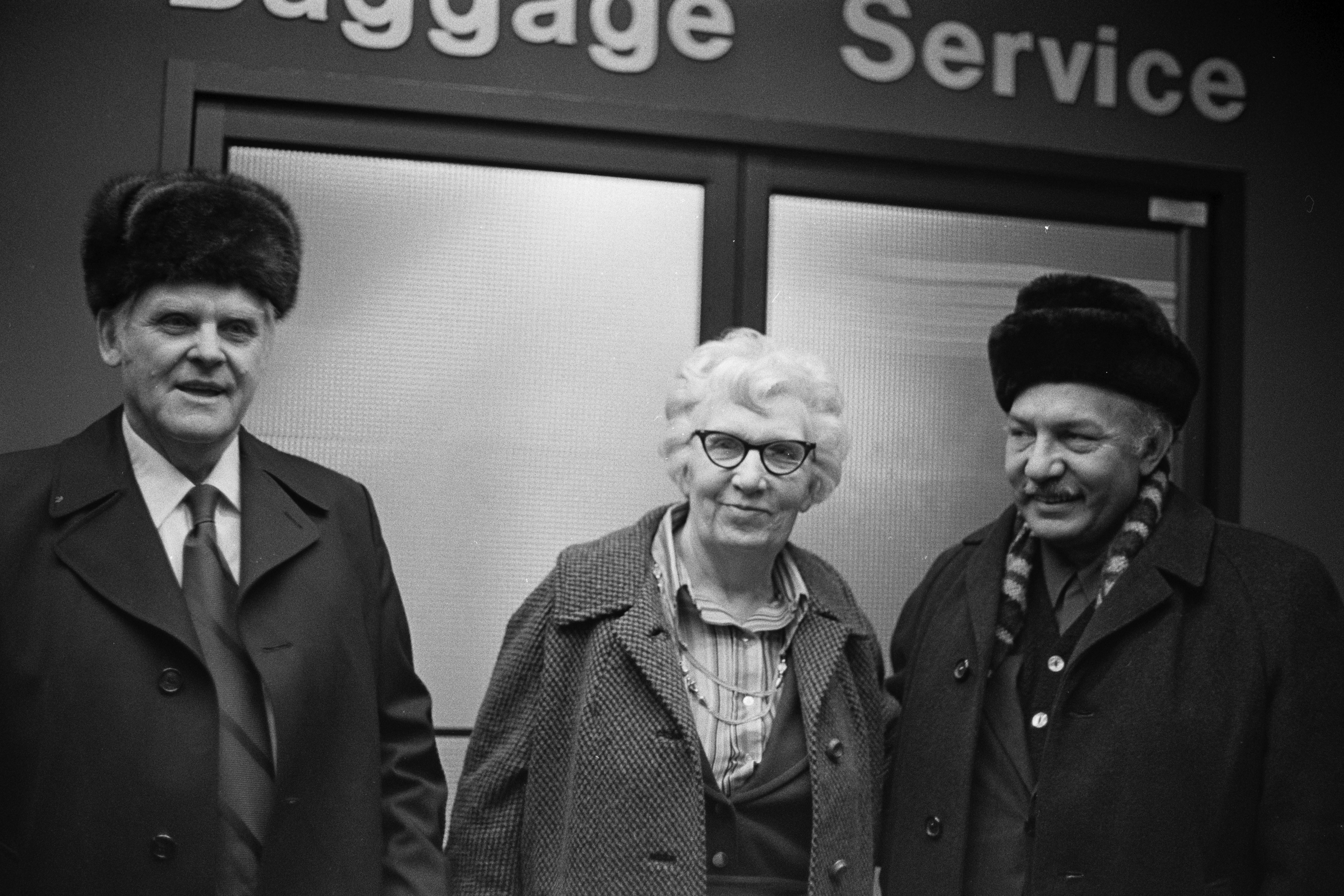
Winter (center) with Gus Hall (left) and James E. Jackson (right), 1976

In the late 1950s, Winter helped establish and operate Global Books, a leftist bookstore in Detroit. For her involvement in the bookstore, she testified against the House Un-American Activities Committee. In 1965, she and her husband returned to New York City, where she again worked as an organizer. She was a founding member of the U.S. Peace Council. It was around this time where she also served as International Affairs Secretary of the CPUSA.

Winter lived the remainder of her life in Detroit, where she held offices in the Michigan branch of the CPUSA. She died there on December 13, 2001, aged 92 or 93.
