= Charles Dirba =

Co-founder of the Communist Party of America (1919)

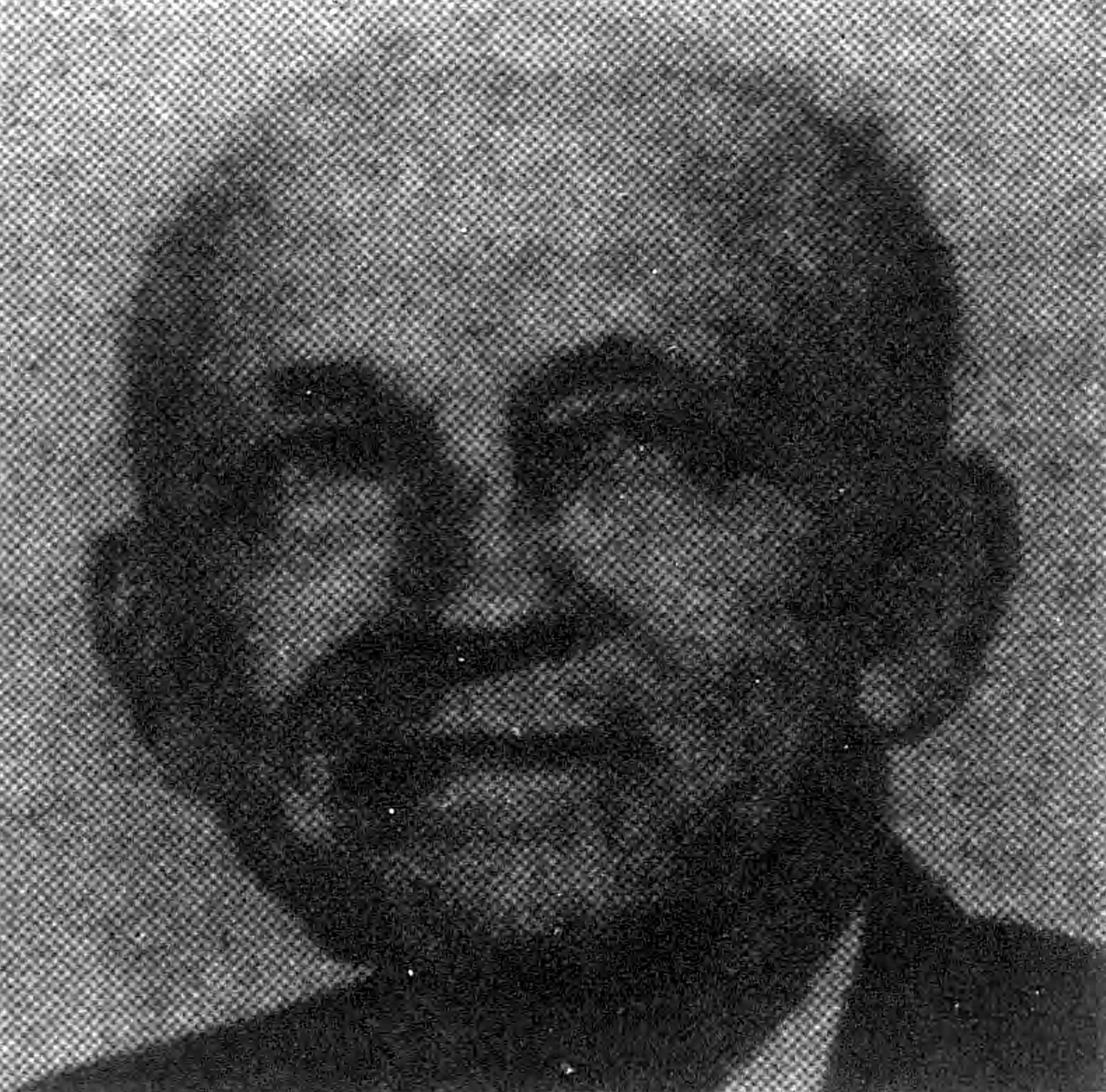
Charles Dirba

Charles Dirba (Latvian: Kārlis Dirba; 1887–1969) was a Latvian-American co-founder of the Communist Party of America (CPA) and Communist Party USA (CPUSA).

== Background ==
Kārlis Dirba was born on January 14, 1887. He studied at Kalnciema Pagastskola and later at Riga Polytechnic Institute.

== Career ==
Charter for a local unit of the CPUSA (dated October 24, 1919)

In 1903, Dirba joined the Social Democrats and by 1905 a revolutionary. In 1907, he emigrated to the United States and by 1908 had joined the Socialist Party of America.

In 1919, Dirba was a co-founder of the Communist Party of America (CPA), following negotiations with Alfred Wagenknecht of the rival United Communist Party. He attended the 1922 Bridgman Convention. By the end of 1922, a single Workers Party of America had emerged.

In 1928, Dirba served as secretary of the Central Committee of the Party's Latvian Group (through 1939). In 1929, he was elected secretary of the Central Committee of the Communist Party USA (successor to the CPA).

In the late 1920s as the Communist Party USA took form and was expelling Lovestoneites, Dirba took part in the purge of suspected Lovestoneite Whittaker Chambers, then an editor at the Daily Worker. In his 1952 memoir Witness, Chambers briefly recounted his own purge, delivered by Dirba:

Presently, the telephone rang . It was the call I had been expecting. "This is Charles A . Dirba," said a deliberately chilling voice. "Comrade, I would like to talk to you. Tonight." Dirba was the chairman of the Central Control Commission... There was no point in returning to the Daily Worker office. I never went back.

During the Scottsboro Boys Case, Diba served as assistant secretary of the International Labor Defense (ILD). In 1938, Dirba urged the CPUSA to purge its own members in a manner similar to the Moscow Trials of the Great Purge.

In 1946, Dirba became a member of the Los Angeles section of the CPUSA through 1950. In 1947, the Lithuanian-American newspaper Draugas called Dirba "an extremely shadowy figure who is the confidential agent of the all-powerful Comintern in the western hemisphere, according to Igor Gouzenko, former cipher clerk in the Soviet embassy in Ottawa."

In 1950, ex-communist Louis F. Budenz described Dirba during the 1940s:

The representative of the Control Commission–either the late Jacob Golos, who was then chairman, or the secretary Charles (also known as Clarence) Dirba–constantly visited me secretly to check on the comrades around me. I would take them to a locked room at the north end of the building, which was set aside for just such "confidential communications ." Little sandy-haired Golos and tall, lanky, bespectacled Dirba were quite unlike in general physical characteristics. But they were similar indeed in their tiptoe walk, their stealthy manner and their quiet speech.

In 1962, Dirba was a member of the American Latvian Workers' Union through 1969.

== Espionage ==
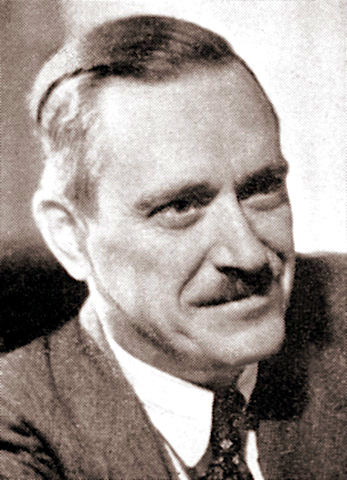
Earl Browder (here, circa 1939) was a CPUSA leader who recruited and/or served as a Soviet spy–like Dirba

Historians Harvey Klehr and John Earl Haynes Jr. have argued that CPUSA leaders (e.g., Earl Browder) doubled as either spies or spy recruiters, and they include Dirba among those. They state that Dirba used the codename "Lapin" and "K. Lapin" when sending messages to "Randolph" (which they deem a "generic pseudonym" for American representatives to the Comintern). Specifically, in VENONA document # 39, Lapin tells Randolph that "a food worker here in New York reports that he has overheard Solomon Rechter's brother boasting to somebody else that Solomon Rechter, in Moscow, was carrying on underground work for Zionist 'black shirts'–the Zhabotinsky group." The sender signed off "Comradely yours, K.Lapin, Sec.CCC"

== Death ==
Charles Dirba died age 82 on February 23, 1969.

== Works ==
Dirba served as fourth and final editor of Amerikas Cīņa (Struggle of America) (1926–1934), the official Latvian organ of the Workers Party of America and the American Latvian Workers' Union .

- "Letter to the United Communist Party in New York" (1920)
- "Letter to 'Comrade Stepan' in Moscow" (1921)
- "Memories of C.E. Ruthenberg" (1940)

== See also ==
- C. E. Ruthenberg
- Albert Inkpin
- Alfred Wagenknecht
- 1922 Bridgman Convention
- Non-English press of the Communist Party USA
- International Labor Defense
- Yan Karlovich Berzin
