= International Unemployment Day =

Worldwide marches and demonstrations in 1930

Cartoon by Fred Ellis published in the Daily Worker on International Unemployment Day highlighting one of the American Communist Party's mobilizing slogans.

International Unemployment Day (March 6, 1930) was a coordinated international campaign of marches and demonstrations, marked by hundreds of thousands of people in major cities around the world taking to the streets to protest mass unemployment associated with the Great Depression. The Unemployment Day marches, organized by the Communist International and coordinated by its various member parties, resulted in two deaths of protestors in Berlin, injuries at events in Vienna and the Basque city of Bilbao, and less violent outcomes in London and Sydney.

In the United States, full-scale riots erupted in New York City and Detroit when thousands of baton-wielding police attacked tens of thousands of marchers. A total of 30 American cities in all saw mass demonstrations as part of the March 6 campaign, including Boston, Milwaukee, Baltimore, Cleveland, Washington, DC, San Francisco, and Seattle.

== History ==
=== Conception of the event ===
By 1930, the economic boom of the 1920s was a mere memory, replaced by a stock market crash and severe contraction of the interlocked capitalist economies of the world. Unemployment became a mass phenomenon, and social services for those affected were minimal.

The Executive Committee of the Communist International (ECCI) in Moscow was preoccupied with the worsening economic crisis from its outset, and identified escalating unemployment as capitalism's potentially most inflammatory flaw. A proposal was made in ECCI to establish March 6, 1930, as an "international day" of protest against unemployment, a decision taken at ECCI's session of January 16. The campaign was further developed by a conference of representatives of Communist parties held in Berlin on January 31, held under the auspices of the West European Bureau of the Comintern.

The coordinated events were initially scheduled for February 26, 1930. It was soon deemed that this early date did not allow sufficient time for preparation, however, and on or about February 17 it was announced in the Communist press around the world that the Executive Committee of the Comintern had postponed International Unemployment Day – moving the event back eight days to March 6. This change of date was not without its lasting embarrassments, however, as in the United States the Communist Party's monthly theoretical magazine had been put into the mail with an incorrect date on the cover.

In Moscow, Comintern head Dmitry Manuilsky reiterated the need for the member parties of the Communist International to exert themselves in conjunction with the International Unemployment Day campaign. In his main report to the "Enlarged Presidium" of ECCI in February, in which he declared that the forthcoming March 6 demonstrations would enable workers to protest against the ruling class's efforts to "shuffle off all the consequences of the ripening world economic crisis on their shoulders".

Manuilsky's report identified the United States as the center of the world economic crisis and pegged American unemployment at 6 million. Germany, said to be "only beginning" to be swept up in the economic cataclysm, was said to have 3.5 million unemployed workers, joined by 2 million more in Great Britain. In all, the Comintern estimated that there were 17 million unemployed workers in the primary capitalist countries, with 60 million (including family members) severely impacted. This it believed to be tinder with which a blaze could be alighted.

=== Events in North America ===
The Communist Party USA (CPUSA) prepared for the March 6 actions with agitational meetings and leaflets, over 1 million of which were circulated in anticipation of the event. The party made use of two primary mobilizing slogans to motivate participation and to generate enthusiasm for the event: "Work or Wages!" and "Don't Starve – Fight!" The demonstrations were to be conducted under the auspices of the party's trade union adjunct, the Trade Union Unity League (TUUL).

==== New York City ====
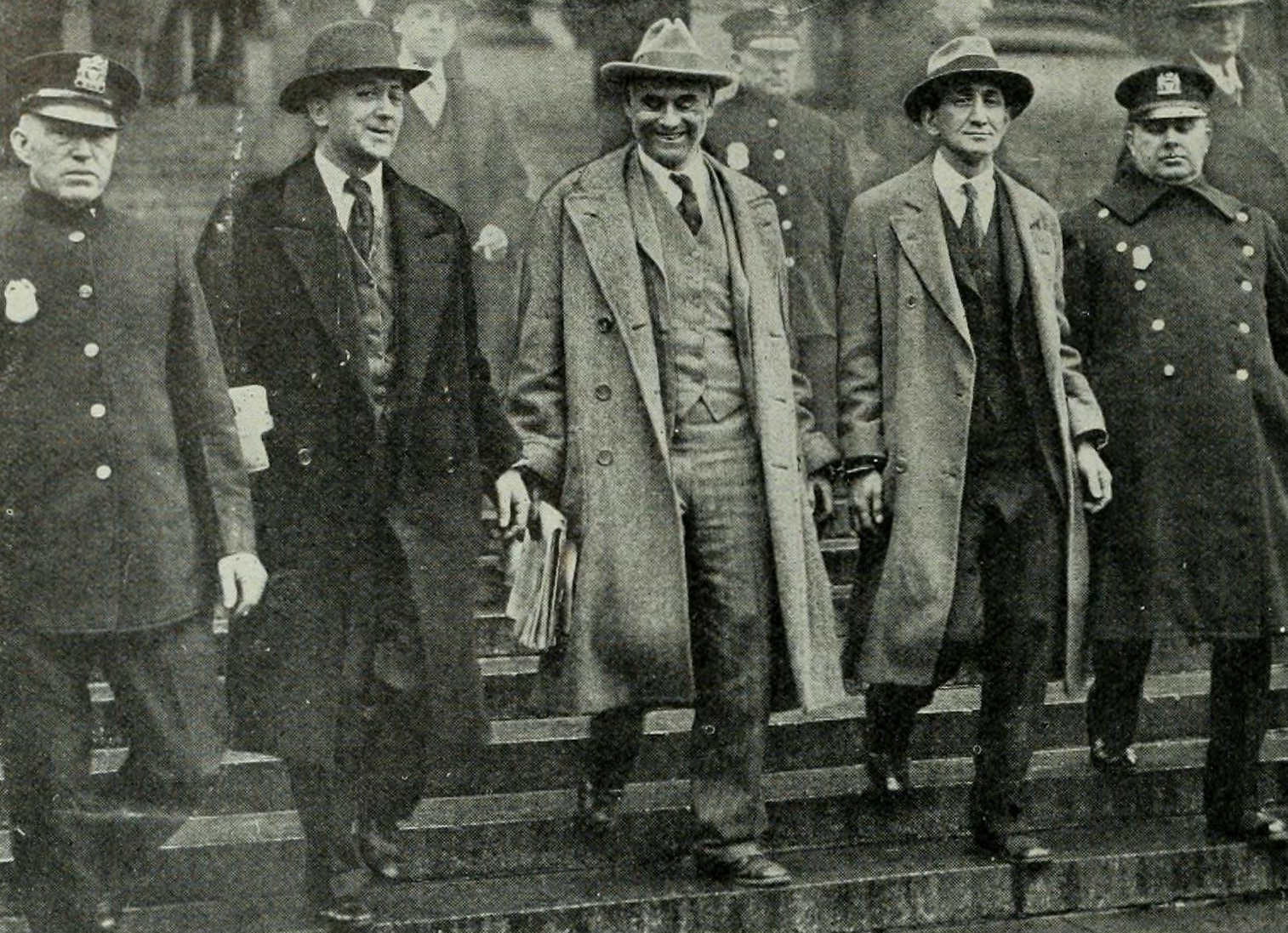
Communist Party leaders William Z. Foster, Robert Minor, and Israel Amter are led down the steps of the New York County Courthouse in Manhattan, New York following their arrests on International Unemployment Day, March 1930

In the estimation of historian Harvey Klehr, the March 6 demonstrations in the United States surpassed every expectation held for them by the CPUSA In New York City, the Communists later asserted that 110,000 turned out, although the staid New York Times claimed the much lower figure of 35,000 instead. A huge throng assembled in Union Square to be addressed by Sam Darcy, a primary organizer of the New York event.

During hasty negotiations with CPUSA leader William Z. Foster, New York City Police Commissioner Grover Whalen refused to allow a procession of the Union Square gathering to city hall on the grounds that no parade permit had been obtained. Foster took to the rostrum to inform the crowd that the right to march was being denied and demanded of the gathering, "Will you take that for an answer?" The crowd vehemently responded in the negative, and Foster immediately began leading an impromptu march down Broadway to City Hall.

That was taken by police as a provocation, and 1,000 officers launched into the procession, touching off 15 min of bitter street fighting. The New York Times said of the scene:

Hundreds of policemen and detectives, swinging nightsticks, blackjacks, and bare fists, rushed into the crowd, hitting out at all with whom they came into contact, chasing many across the street and into adjacent thoroughfares and pushing hundreds off their feet. From all parts of the scene of battle came the screams of women and cries of men with bloody heads and faces.

Firemen turned hoses onto the crowd and a police truck equipped with tear gas, submachine guns, and riot guns was driven to the scene. Foster was arrested together with Communist Party leaders Robert Minor, and Israel Amter on the steps of City Hall. The group ultimately received sentences and served six months in jail for their participation in the suppressed march.

==== Detroit ====
New York was not the only American city to see International Unemployment Day violence. In Detroit, more than 100,000 turned out, according to the Communist Party. A peaceful demonstration gave way to a pitched two-hour battle between 25,000 demonstrators and 3,000 police wielding clubs, some of whom trampled the crowd with horses, according to the official Communist account. Twenty-six people were hospitalized as a result of the violence, including one policeman, and more than two dozen protestors were arrested.

This depiction of events was challenged by others. William Miller of the rival Communist Party (Majority Group), headed by Jay Lovestone, asserted that about 30,000 workers had answered the call to demonstrate on March 6, joined for a brief time by about 45,000 downtown employees off during lunch hour. While the gathering had been "splendid" as a spontaneous protest of unemployed workers, "as an organized demonstration it was a fiasco," Miller asserted, noting that the space where the gathering was scheduled was inadequate and that no platform had been constructed so that party leaders were unable to address the assembled crowd. Moreover, Miller notes, CPUSA District Organizer Jack Stachel had gone into hiding two days before the event and did not even witness the purported incidents about which he so breathlessly wired the Daily Worker.

==== Chicago ====
In Chicago some 50,000 turned out to cap 10 days of radical protests and police repression. Over 150 arrests had already been made by Chicago police during the first week of March, the headquarters of the Communist Party was raided and wrecked not once but twice, as were offices of the International Labor Defense, the Trade Union Unity League, Workers International Relief, the Communist Lithuanian-language newspaper Vilnis, and a Russian cooperative store. Despite the climate of fear, an estimated 50,000 turned out for the International Unemployment Day protest, marching through the streets 12 abreast for about four hours. The demonstration concluded with a large open air meeting at the Chicago stockyards, addressed by CPUSA district organizer Clarence Hathaway, TUUL organizer Nels Kjar, and representatives of the Young Communist League and black workers.

==== Other cities ====
The cover of the February 1930 issue of the CPUSA's theoretical magazine ran with a cancelled earlier date for the International Unemployment Day demonstrations.

Less tumultuous demonstrations were held Boston, with the CPUSA claiming that as many as 50,000 turning out, and Milwaukee, which was said to have included 40,000. Additionally, 50,000 demonstrators were claimed for the event in Pittsburgh, 30,000 in Philadelphia, 25,000 in Cleveland, and about 20,000 in Youngstown. According to the CPUSA press an additional 15,000 assembled at LaFayette Square in Buffalo, New York, a like number in Canton, Ohio, while 10,000 marched in Washington, DC. Substantial demonstrations were also held in San Francisco, Los Angeles, Seattle, Denver, Baltimore, and other large cities. All told, more than 30 American cities were the site of protests and marches on March 6.

In all the CPUSA claimed that more than 1.25 million workers "demonstrated on the streets in face of the police terror and poisonous propaganda of the American Federation of Labor and Socialist Party". The Communists claimed the event was a success in raising awareness of the problem of mass unemployment in America as well as placing themselves in a position of authority among those so affected:

Only two days prior to March 6, American capitalism refused to recognize that there is unemployment in the United States; but the determination of the masses to struggle under the political leadership of the Communist Party and the revolutionary trade unions force the Hoover administration and Secretary of Labor Davis to recognize that there are at least three million unemployed workers in the United States. ... While the unemployed workers were mobilized on economic demands to fight for work or wages, yet the Communist Party and the revolutionary trade unions did not fail to point out that unemployment cannot be abolished under capitalism and only the destruction of capitalist state and the abolition of capitalism can solve the unemployment problem. It is precisely this political turn of the unemployment movement that American capitalism fears.

The press of the rival Communist Party (Majority Group) charged that the CPUSA's attendance estimates were substantially inflated. The CPMG offered that rather than 50,000 participants in Chicago, an estimate of 5,000 was closer to the truth, while in New York City instead of 110,000 demonstrators there were more like 50,000, of which "the greatest number were bystanders, not participants." Even more serious exaggeration was said to have applied in the case of Philadelphia, in which "less than 300 by careful count" actually marched to CP headquarters. Events in Wilkes-Barre (29 participants, of whom 6 were arrested) and New Bedford (150 in attendance, 50 actually marching) were held up as examples of CPUSA organizational failure.

Excluding those arrested on in events leading up to the March 6 demonstrations, a total of about 250 people were arrested in the various International Unemployment Day demonstrations in the United States. These included 60 arrests in Los Angeles, 45 in Detroit, 36 in Milwaukee, 30 in New York City, 15 in Pittsburgh, 13 in Washington, DC, and 12 in Buffalo. While demonstrations were largest and arrests most numerous in the Northeastern United States and Upper Midwest region, other demonstrations and arrests took place in the country's more conservative Southern region, including 7 arrests in Chattanooga, 3 in New Orleans, and 2 in Atlanta.

=== Events in Europe ===
The coordinated demonstrations of March 6 were urged on with banner headlines in the Communist press.

In Europe, the largest and most violent International Unemployment Day demonstrations took place in Germany, home to the largest Communist Party outside of the Soviet Union. In Berlin a decree was issued banning all street demonstrations, which was widely ignored. Police violently dispersed these gatherings as they developed, making uses of clubs and gunfire. Battles between police and strikers raged into the evening, with law enforcement authorities making use of trucks with searchlights.

Other significant German clashes between demonstrators and police took place in the cities of Halle, Hamburg, and Munich. Press reports on the day of the event indicated that two marchers were killed in the Halle protest.

In Vienna, about 2500 marchers fought in the streets with police and young members of the fascist movement. A number of people were injured, and seven arrests made as a result of the violence.

In London, four processions of marchers converged on Tower Hill to hear speeches by Tom Mann and Jack Gallagher. One group of demonstrators who attempted to march on the Mansion House against police instructions met with police resistance, with several marchers and one policeman injured in the battle which followed. The London demonstration lasted for well over four hours.

A major demonstration also took place in the industrial city of Manchester, in which thousands of workers marched on the city's labor exchange.

Turnout in Paris was modest, with demonstrations banned, and only about 2500 protestors willing to challenge the large force of police and soldiers positioned to keep order. French authorities made use of clubs on a group of marchers attempting to push through a police line.

Several thousand marchers, primarily building trades workers, turned out in the Spanish city of Seville.

=== Aftermath ===
The Executive Committee of the Communist International was not impressed by the International Unemployment Day demonstrations, claiming that a "comparatively small number of the unemployed" had actually taken part and that united front efforts to build political bridges between workers and the unemployed as well as between the various political organizations had been inadequate.

The CPUSA was singled out for special criticism at the 11th Enlarged Plenum of ECCI in March 1931, with Osip Piatnitsky mocking the slogans used by the American Party, declaring of the slogan "Work or Wages" that "if I were unemployed and in America, I should not have understood this slogan." It similarly expressed disdain for the slogan "Don't Starve – Fight!" as ineffective.

The CPUSA was much more upbeat in their assessment of the events, claiming that the March 6 demonstrations was an impetus to thousands of new members joining the organization, with an article in the group's monthly theoretical magazine claiming that a total of 6,167 new recruits had entered party ranks between March 6 and May Day, 1930. It also helped boost the Communist Party into the public consciousness as "a recognized power, a major American political factor," the party proudly proclaimed.

The International Unemployment Day march in New York City led to the cashiering of one of the CPUSA's enemies, Police Commissioner Whalen, who came under fire for the brutal police handling of the otherwise peaceful demonstration and was forced to resign.

Still, the gains of International Unemployment Day for the American Communists proved ephemeral, as follow up demonstrations on May Day and August 1, 1930 proved much smaller. Historian Harvey Klehr has noted that already by the end of April "there were rueful admissions that the March 6 success was due less to Communist capture of the masses than to the spontaneous outpouring of hundreds of thousands of workers with no other outlet for expressing their feelings."

Moreover, there was also a reaction. At 10:00 am on June 9, 1930, a new "Special Committee to Investigate Communist Activities in the United States" was called to order by the U.S. House of Representatives for the first time. This committee, remembered to history as the Fish Committee in recognition of its chairman, Hamilton Fish III of New York, was established by Congress on May 22, just eleven weeks after the mass demonstrations of March 6.

The Fish Committee would eventually call scores of witnesses and publish hundreds of pages of testimony in its ongoing mission "to investigate Communist propaganda in the United States" and the activities and membership of the Communist Party and the place of the Communist International in America. The 1930 Fish Committee would prove to be the institutional forerunner of the House Un-American Activities Committee, established in 1938.

== See also ==
- National Campaign Committee for Unemployment Insurance
