= Robert Minor =

American cartoonist (1884–1952)

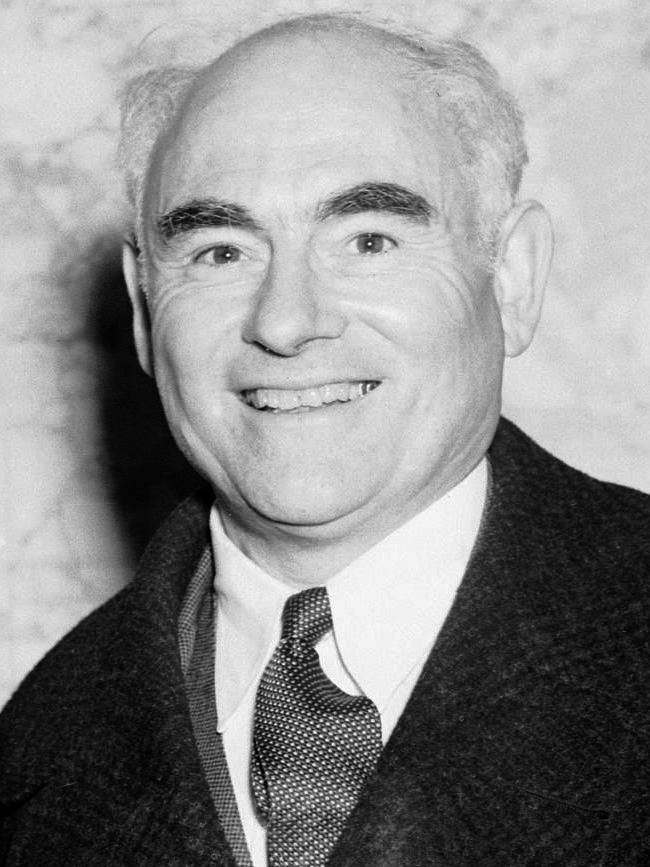
Minor in 1938

Robert Berkeley "Bob" Minor (July 15, 1884 – January 26, 1952), alternatively known as "Fighting Bob", was a political cartoonist, a radical journalist, and, beginning in 1920, a leading member of the Communist Party USA.

== Early life ==
Robert Minor, best known to those who knew him by the nickname "Bob", was born July 15, 1884, in San Antonio, Texas. Minor came from old and respected family lines. On his father's side, General John Minor had served as Thomas Jefferson's Presidential campaign manager; his mother was related to General Sam Houston, first President of the Republic of Texas. His father was a school teacher and lawyer, later elected as a judge, while his maternal grandfather was a doctor.

Despite the notable family forefathers, Bob Minor was the product of what one historian has called "the hard-up, run-down middle class," living in an "unpainted frontier cottage in San Antonio." Minor was unable to begin school until age 10 due to his family's dire financial straits before leaving school at age 14 to take a job as a Western Union messenger boy to help support his family. Minor left home two years later, going to work at a variety of different jobs, including time spent as a sign painter, a carpenter, a farm worker, and a railroad laborer.

== Adult career ==
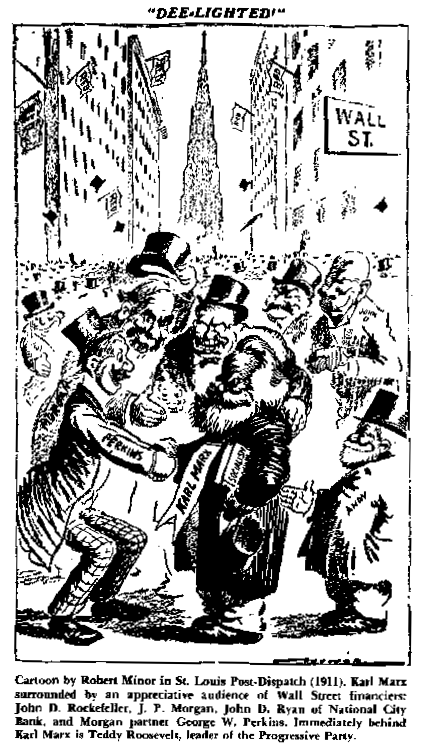
An example of Minor's early pen-and-ink work in the St. Louis Post-Dispatch (1911).

In 1904, at the age of twenty, Robert Minor was hired as an assistant stereotypist and handyman at the San Antonio Gazette, where he developed his artistic talent in his spare time. Minor emerged as an accomplished political cartoonist.

=== Cartoonist ===
Minor moved to St. Louis to take a position as a cartoonist for the St. Louis Post-Dispatch. Minor's work, initially very conventional in form using pen-and-ink, was transformed by his move to the use of grease crayon on paper. Minor gained recognition as the chief cartoonist at the Post-Dispatch and was considered by many to be among the best in the country.

In 1911, Robert Minor was hired by the New York World, where he became the highest paid cartoonist in the United States. His father was on a parallel path of advancement, transformed by a 1910 election "from an unsuccessful lawyer to an influential district judge."

=== Journalist ===
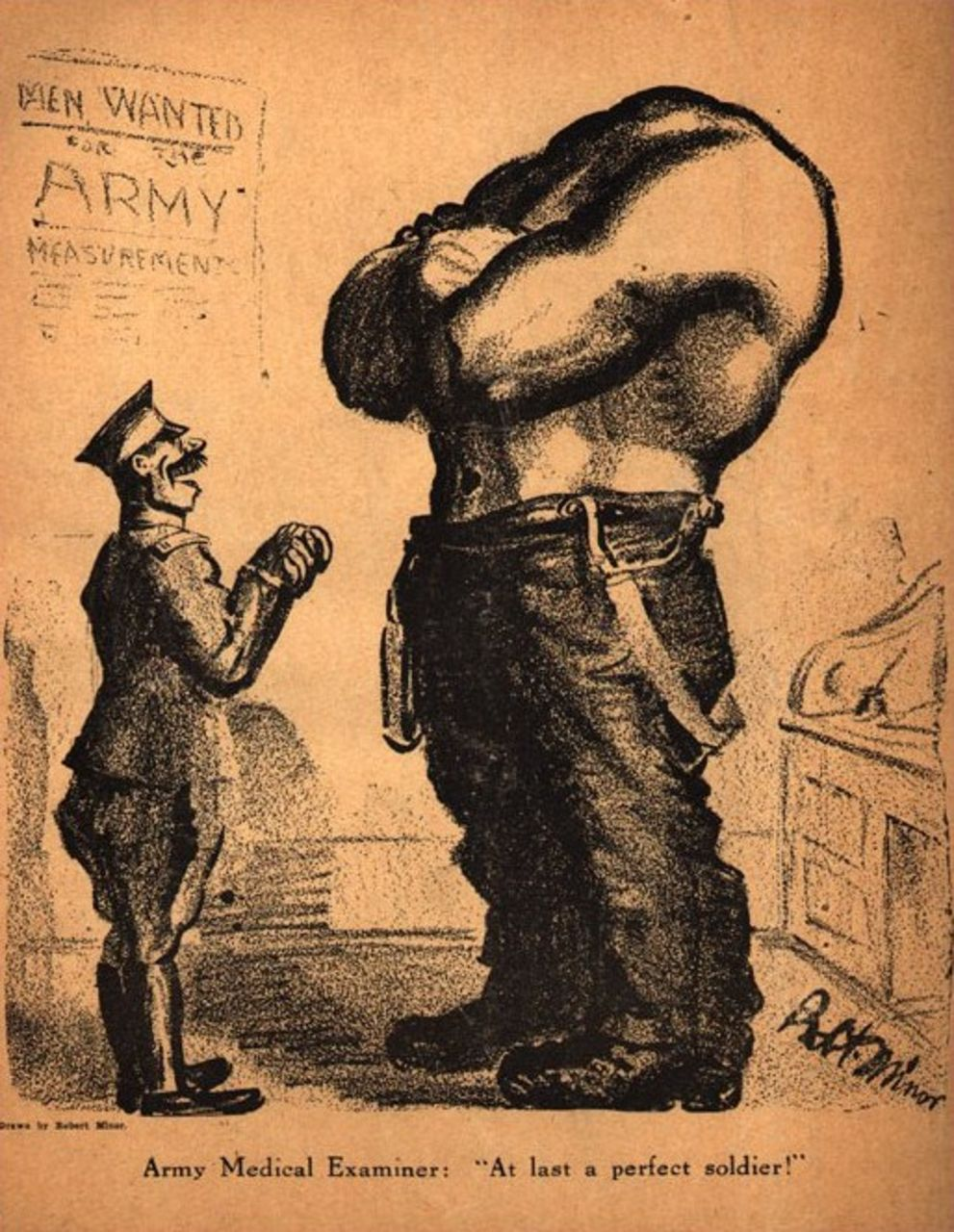
A controversial Minor cartoon from the July 1916 issue of The Masses. The caption reads: "Army Medical Examiner: 'At last — a perfect soldier!'"

In 1907, Minor joined the Socialist Party of America. By the beginning of 1912, he had moved towards an anarchist orientation and support of revolutionary industrial unionism.

Minor had saved several hundred dollars earned in St. Louis and decided that he wanted to go to Paris to attend art school to perfect his craft. In France he enrolled in a class at the Ecole des Beaux Arts, the French national art school, but he found the experience unsatisfying. Minor spent the rest of his time in Paris studying art on his own and taking part in the left wing labor movement through the Socialist Party of France. Minor returned to the United States in 1914, just prior to the outbreak of World War I.

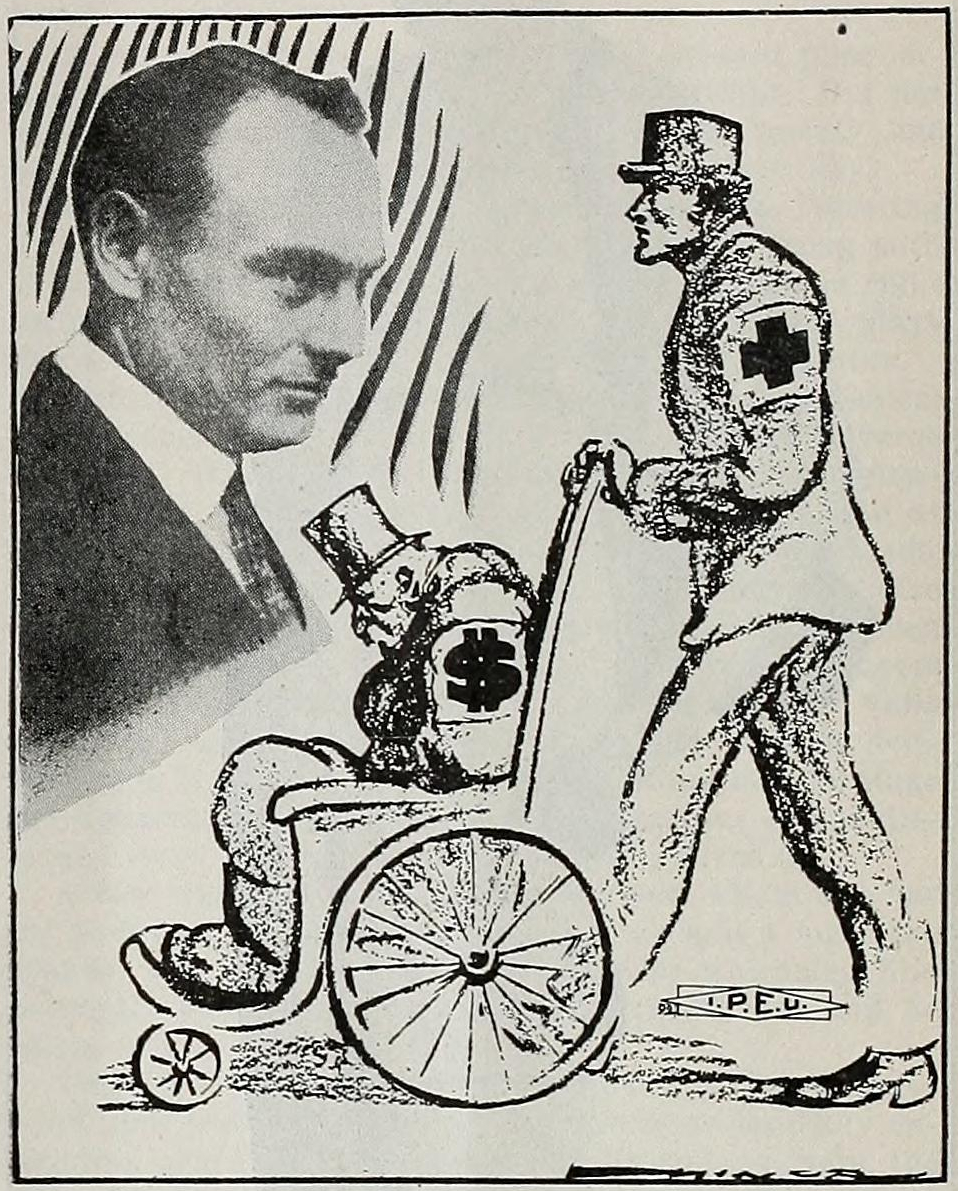
Minor and his art, published 1913

The year 1914 saw Minor in the unusual position of being paid but unable to work, with an old contract he had signed with the New York World continuing to pay him a salary merely to keep him from drawing for other papers. However, with the outbreak of the First World War in August Minor began to make a series of aggressive and provocative cartoons attacking both sides of the European conflict for their imperialism. While The World initially began to use these cartoons, his employer soon demanded that the artist begin to draw pro-war panels. Minor was unalterably opposed to the World War and was faced with a choice between his paycheck and his beliefs. His convictions won and Minor was successful in having his contract with The World annulled.

On June 1, 1915, Minor moved to the New York Call, a Socialist Party-affiliated daily broadsheet. Minor also began contributing aggressively anti-war cartoons to Max Eastman's radical New York monthly, The Masses. Minor's radical cartoons would later provide fodder for the United States government's prosecution of The Masses for alleged violation of the Espionage Act of 1917, a legal assault which would eventually lead to the demise of the magazine when Wilson's administration banned it from the U.S. Mail. (Eastman regrouped and commenced publication of The Liberator, whose editorial staff Minor later joined.) Minor was sent as a war correspondent of The Call to Europe, where he wrote from France and Italy. Part of Minor's European expenses were being borne by a liberal newspaper syndicate in exchange for use of his drawings from the front. The syndicate found themselves unable to use the radical material which Minor was by this time producing and The Call was forced to recall him from Europe.

In 1916, Minor was dispatched by The Call to Mexico to cover the American intervention there. When the "Mexican War" came to a sudden conclusion, Minor went to California for a rest. There he became deeply involved in the defense campaign of radical trade unionists Thomas Mooney and Warren Billings in their highly publicized legal case accusing them of bombing of the 1916 San Francisco "Preparedness Day" parade. Minor worked full-time for a year and a half as the publicity director for the International Workers Defense League, an organization established to provide legal support and build public sympathy for Mooney and Billings and their co-defendants. Minor authored several pamphlets in 1917 and 1918 and spoke to a wide range of audiences about the "frame-up" being perpetrated on the radical trade unionists through their convictions.

The Call, dispatched Minor to Europe as a war correspondent in 1918, with Minor continuing to contribute material on the European revolutionary movement to the successor to The Masses, The Liberator. In May 1918, Minor arrived in Soviet Russia, where he remained until November. While there, he met Vladimir Lenin and wrote anti-war propaganda for distribution to English-speaking troops involved in the invasion of Soviet Russia. The experience proved to be a watershed for Minor, winning him over to the cause of communism. Minor later traveled to Germany, where he saw the German Revolution firsthand, and thereafter to France.

While in Paris in 1919, Minor was arrested and charged with treason for advising French railway workers to strike against the shipment of munitions to interventionist forces in Soviet Russia. Minor was shipped out to Germany, where he was confined in the American military prison at Coblenz, Germany for several weeks, eventually gaining his release due in large measure to political pressure exerted by his well-connected family in America.

=== Communist ===
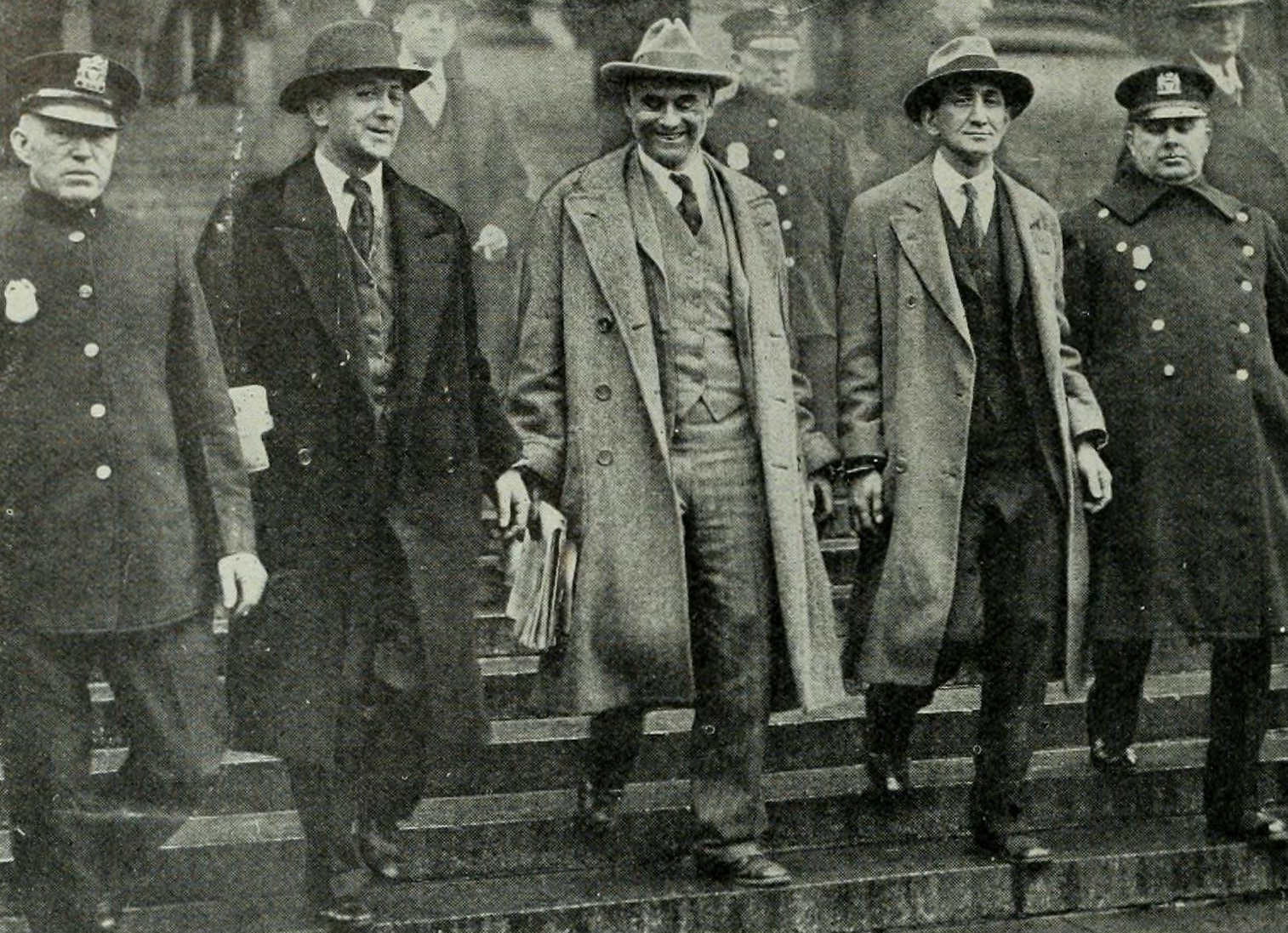
Communist Party leaders William Z. Foster, Robert Minor, and Israel Amter are led down the steps of the New York County Courthouse in Manhattan, New York following their arrests on International Unemployment Day, March 1930

Upon his return to the United States in 1920, Minor immediately joined the underground American Communist Party. Minor was a supporter of the United Communist Party in the convoluted factional struggle of the day, joining the newly unified Communist Party of America (CPA) along with the rest of his organization when the UCP merged with the old CPA in the spring of 1921.

After the merger of the UCP with the old CPA in May 1921, Minor, using his underground pseudonym of "Ballister", was sent to Soviet Russia as the representative of the newly unified party to the Executive Committee of the Communist International (ECCI). Minor was also a delegate of the CPA to the 3rd World Congress of the Comintern, held in Moscow in June 1921. While there, he met Lenin for a second time. Minor was recalled to America by the CPA in November 1921, replaced as American "Rep" to the Comintern by L. E. Katterfeld.

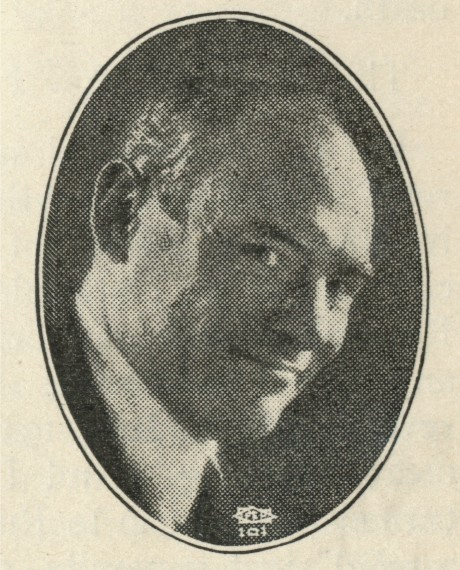
Minor c. 1922

Minor was coopted to the governing Central Executive Committee of the CPA on April 24, 1922, by decision of the CEC itself. He was re-elected in his own right at the ill-fated August 1922 convention held on the shores of Lake Michigan just outside the tiny Michigan town of Bridgman. This convention was raided by local and Michigan state authorities, acting in concert with the Bureau of Investigation of the U.S. Department of Justice, who had an undercover agent sitting as a delegate. Wanted by the police, Minor surrendered with 9 others on March 10, 1923, and was released shortly thereafter on $1,000 bond. He was never tried for this alleged violation of the Michigan criminal syndicalism law.

From 1923 to 1924, Minor sat on the Executive Committee of the Friends of Soviet Russia, the American affiliate of the Comintern's Workers International Relief organization. He was also elected to the governing Central Executive Committee of the CPA's "legal" political offshoot, the Workers Party of America, elected by the conventions of that organization in 1922 and 1923. He was returned to ECCI in 1926 at the time of the 7th Enlarged Plenum of ECCI and was elected to the ECCI's inner circle, the Presidium, using the party-name "Duncan." Minor was also elected as an alternate to the Comintern's Budget Commission.

Minor became responsible for the Party's Central Committee for Negro Work, and oversaw the Communists attempts to build unity with Marcus Garvey and his Universal Negro Improvement Association and African Communities League. During the tumultuous factional politics of the middle 1920s, Minor was a loyalist to the faction headed by C.E. Ruthenberg, John Pepper, and Jay Lovestone. Minor had been disappointed by the watering down of the "Negro Equality" proposal the Communists submitted to the founding convention of the Farmer–Labor Party in 1924. He believed the party leadership under William Z. Foster "went along with ... concessions in the hope of mollifying antiblack southern farmers and AFL leaders with an eye toward future cooperation."

On March 6, 1930, Minor was part of a great series of demonstrations of the unemployed conducted around the United States under the guidance of the Communist Party. Minor was arrested at the demonstration held in Union Square in New York City, a rally which ended in a riot pitting marchers and police. Minor was arrested in conjunction with these events, together with his Communist Party comrades William Z. Foster, Israel Amter, and Harry Felton. The four were sentenced to 3 year terms in the New York state penitentiary. After serving 6 months in jail, Minor fell ill with appendicitis, which caused him to be taken out in an ambulance to a private hospital for surgery. Minor spent the better part of the next two years attempting to recover his health.

Minor served as editor of the Daily Worker from 1928 until his arrest in 1930.

Bob Minor ran for elective political office a number of times. In 1924 he ran for U.S. Congress in Illinois as a candidate of the Workers Party for an at-large seat. In 1928, he ran on the Workers (Communist) Party ticket for U.S. Senator from New York. He ran for Congress from New York in 1930 and again ten years later. He also ran for Mayor of New York City in 1933, and in 1936 he headed the state Communist ticket as the party's candidate for Governor of New York.

At the 7th World Congress of the Comintern in 1935, Minor was elected to the Comintern's International Control Commission, which dealt with personnel assignments and questions of discipline. He was an unflinching supporter of every twist and turn of Soviet foreign policy throughout the decade of the 1930s.

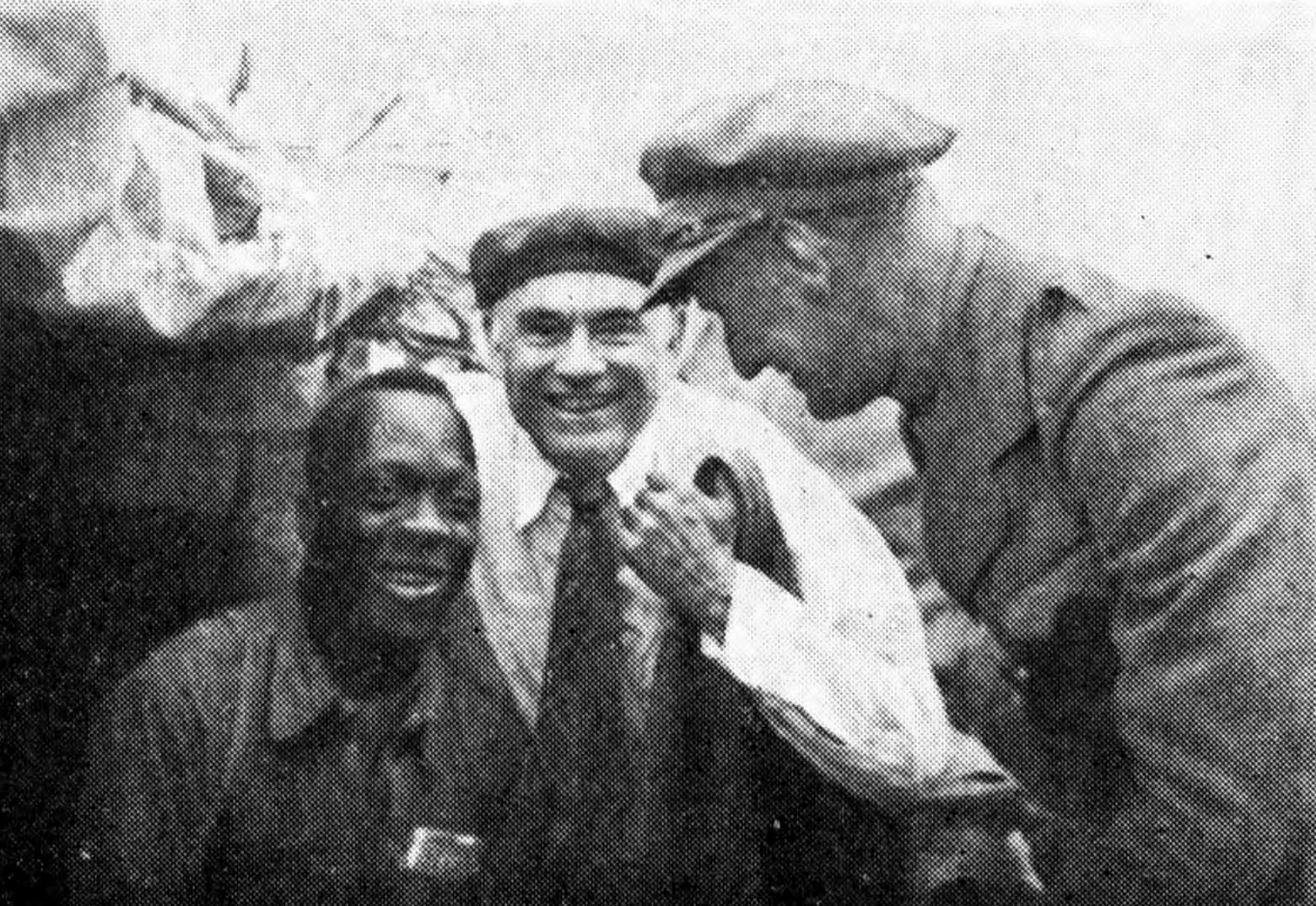
Minor (center) with Douglass Roach (left) and Lieutenant Colonel Claus on a visit to Spain, 1937

On the outbreak of the Spanish Civil War in 1936, Minor traveled to Spain and helped in the organization of the Lincoln Battalion, a unit of international volunteers that supported the Spanish Popular Front government in the battle against the nationalists led by General Francisco Franco.

In 1941, with Communist Party General Secretary Earl Browder jailed for passport charges, Minor served as the acting General Secretary of the party.

In 1945, as a member of the CPUSA's governing National Committee, Minor dissociated himself from the discredited Browder, but he was nonetheless relegated to the role of Washington correspondent of The Daily Worker.

Bob Minor suffered a heart attack in 1948 and was bedridden during the time of McCarthyism when his fellow leaders of the American Communist Party were arrested and imprisoned. Owing to his frail health, the United States government chose not to proceed against him.

== Death ==
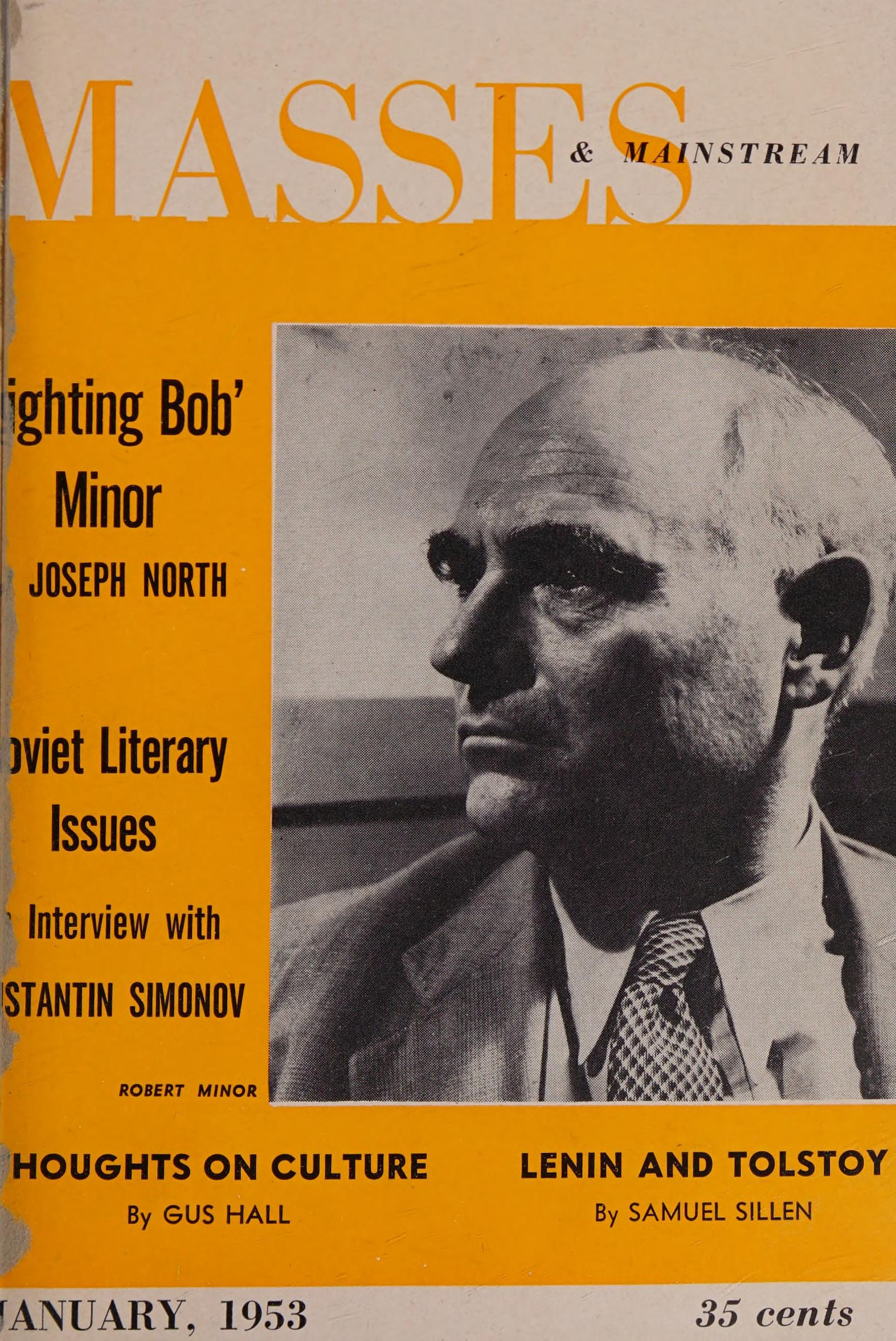
Minor on the cover of Masses & Mainstream, January 1953

Robert Minor died on January 26, 1952, survived by his wife, the artist Lydia Gibson. The couple had no children.

== Legacy ==
Minor is remembered by some as the inspiration for the fictional character "Don Stevens" in John Dos Passos' U.S.A. trilogy.

The historian Theodore Draper opined:

Minor is a study in extremes. A truly gifted and powerful cartoonist, he renounced art for politics. He made this gesture of total subservience to politics after years as an anarchist despising and denouncing politics. But he could not transfer his genius from art to politics. The stirring drawings were replaced by boring and banal speeches. He had none of the gifts of the natural politician, his stock in trade was limited to platitudes and slogans. The wild man, tamed, became a political hack. If as an anarchist he had believed that politics was a filthy business, as a Communist he still seemed to believe it was — only now it was his business.

Minor's papers are housed in the Rare Book & Manuscript section on the 6th floor of Butler Library at Columbia University. Approximately 15,000 items are included in the collection, which is housed in some 65 archival boxes.

== Works ==
=== Books, pamphlets, article ===
- 1916: "War Pictures," New York Call
- 1917:
  - The Frame-Up System: Story of So-Called Bomb Trials in San Francisco. San Francisco: International Worker's Defense League
  - Fickert has Ravished Justice: Story of So-Called Bomb Trials in San Francisco. San Francisco: International Worker's Defense League
- 1918: Shall Mooney Hang?: Justice Raped in California. San Francisco: International Worker's Defense League
- 1920: Stedman's Red Raid. Cleveland: Toiler Publishing Association
- 1921: "Resolved: That the Terms of the Third International are Inacceptable to the Revolutionary Socialists of the World": Being the Report of a Debate, Held in Star Casino, New York City, Sunday, January Sixteenth, 1921: Affirmative James Oneal vs. Negative Robert Minor. New York: Academy Press
- 1936: The Struggle Against War: And the Peace Policy of the Soviet Union. New York: Workers Library Publishers
- 1941: The Fight Against Hitlerism. New York: Workers Library Publishers, 1941. (With William Z. Foster.)
- One War to Defeat Hitler. New York: Workers Library Publishers
- 1942:
  - Free Earl Browder!
  - The Year of Great Decision, 1942. New York: Workers Library Publishers, 1942
  - Our Ally: The Soviet Union. New York: Workers Library Publishers
- 1943: Invitation to Join the Communist Party. New York: Workers Library Publishers
- 1944: The Heritage of the Communist Political Association. New York: Workers Library Publishers
- 1946: Lynching and Frame-up in Tennessee. New York: Workers Library Publishers

=== Contributed works ===
- Red Cartoons of 1926: From The Daily Worker and the Workers Monthly. New York: The Daily Worker Publishing Company, 1926. Also available from Marxist Internet Archive.
- Red Cartoons of 1927: From The Daily Worker and the Workers Monthly. New York: The Daily Worker Publishing Company, 1927. Also available from Marxist Internet Archive.
- Red Cartoons of 1928: From The Daily Worker and the Workers Monthly. New York: The Daily Worker Publishing Company, 1928. Also available from Marxist Internet Archive.

=== Articles ===
- "Have You A Country?". Revolt, Vol. 1, No. 2 (January 15, 1916), pp. 6–7.
- "Our 'C.E.': In Memory of C.E. Ruthenberg, July 9, 1882–March 2, 1927". The Communist, Vol. 14, No. 3 (March 1935), pp. 217–226. OCLC 35811669 Full issue available at Marxist Internet Archive.
