= Alfred Wagenknecht =

American Marxist activist and politician (1881–1956)

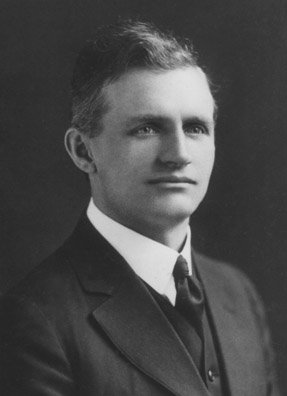
- Wagenknecht c. 1918
- Born: Alfred Wagenknecht; August 15, 1881; Görlitz, Province of Silesia, German Empire
- Died: August 26, 1956 (aged 75); Illinois, U.S.
- Political party: Communist Party USA
- Other political affiliations: Socialist Party of America (before 1919); Communist Labor Party of America (1919–1921)
- Spouse: Hortense Allison (m. 1905)
- Children: Helen
- Relatives: Elmer Allison (brother-in-law)

Alfred Wagenknecht (August 15, 1881 – August 26, 1956) was an American Marxist activist and political functionary. He is best remembered for having played a critical role in the establishment of the Communist Party USA in 1919 as a leader of the Left Wing Section of the Socialist Party. Wagenknecht served as executive secretary of the Communist Labor Party of America and the United Communist Party of America in 1919 and 1920, respectively.

== Biography ==
=== Early years ===
Alfred Wagenknecht, called "Wag" (pronounced "Wog") by many of his friends, was born August 15, 1881, in Görlitz, Imperial Germany, the son of Ernst Wagenknecht, a shoemaker. The family emigrated to the United States in 1884, and thus the German-born Wagenknecht essentially grew up as an American, living in Cleveland before departing as a young man for Washington state, on the West Coast.

The Wagenknecht family was politically radical from Alfred's early years, with his father making a cash donation to the colonization fund established by the fledgling Social Democracy of America in November 1897.

=== Political activity in Washington state ===
Wagenknecht was drawn to radical politics at an early age, elected Organizer of the Pike Street Branch of Local Seattle, Socialist Party of America in 1903. In this capacity he organized speakers for the branch, coordinated "street meetings" designed to bring socialist ideas to passersby by means of soapbox speakers, and organized social events such as music recitals and dances.

The next year saw Wagenknecht serving as the Press Agent for Local Seattle. He was an active member in the party's radical Pike Street Branch, which engaged in a long-running battle with the moderate Central Branch throughout the decade.

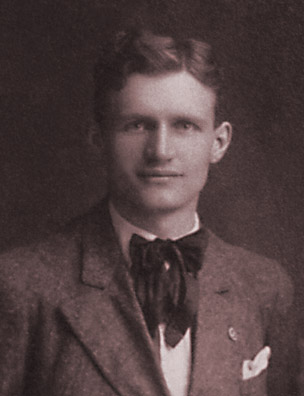
Wagenknecht c. 1905

In 1905 Wagenknecht married Hortense Allison, sister of party comrade Elmer Allison. They had a daughter, Helen. Wagenknecht was prominent in the ongoing free speech fights which local Seattle had with city officials over the right to speak in public and hold meetings on city streets and sidewalks.

Wagenknecht was elected to the State Committee of the Socialist Party of Washington (SPW) in 1905 and was the paid Local Secretary-Treasurer of a newly reorganized Local Seattle in 1906.

In 1907, with the return of Hermon F. Titus's left wing publication, The Socialist, to Seattle, Wagenknecht left the employ of Local Seattle and went to work for Titus as Business Manager for his publication.

Wagenknecht was a delegate of the SPW to the 1908 National Convention of the Socialist Party, where he fought a bitter battle with a representative of a moderate faction of the old Local Seattle organization which had been deprived of its charter by the State Committee for "political fusionism" late in 1906. The pair argued their cases on the floor of the convention for 20 minutes each, with the body ultimately deciding not to intervene against the left wing State Committee.

In 1912 he was elected Assistant State Secretary of the SPW.

As was the case for many rank-and-file party members of the day, Wagenknecht was a regular candidate for public office on the Socialist ticket, running for US Congress in 1906, for Seattle Comptroller in 1908, and for Congress again in 1912 when the party's first choice, John Wanhope, stepped aside.

In July 1913, Wagenknecht became Editor of the Everett, Washington Socialist weekly The Commonwealth.

=== Move to Ohio ===
Shortly after assuming editorship of The Commonwealth, Wagenknecht decided to move along, going to work for the National Office of the Socialist Party of America as a National Organizer. In 1914, he was elected to the governing National Executive Committee of the Socialist Party for the first time. After his stint in Chicago came to a close, Wagenknecht moved his family back to Ohio, where he was elected State Secretary of the Socialist Party of Ohio in 1917, serving through 1919. He was also a delegate to the pivotal 1917 Emergency National Convention of the SPA, held at the Planters' Hotel in St. Louis, Missouri, at which the St. Louis Program against the war in Europe was adopted.

After American entry into the war, Wagenknecht's unyielding antimilitarism brought him into conflict with the law. State Secretary Wagenknecht was indicted along with Local Cuyahoga County head C. E. Ruthenberg and Ohio State Organizer Charles Baker for allegedly obstructing the draft. The trio were tried together and found guilty and sentenced to 1 year in the State Penitentiary on July 21, 1917. This decision was upheld by the US Supreme Court on January 15, 1918, and the three were not released until after completion of the sentence (less time off) on December 8, 1918.

While still in jail Wagenknecht was selected by the June 14–16, 1918 state convention of the Socialist Party of Ohio as the party's nominee for Ohio Secretary of State in the November election.

Upon his release, "Wag" was elected to the National Executive Committee of the Socialist Party and worked for National Office running the party's Propaganda Department. He was an early and fierce adherent of the Left Wing Manifesto authored by Louis C. Fraina and was active in the Left Wing Section of the Socialist Party, the organized faction seeking to "win the Socialist Party for the Left Wing." Wagenknecht ran for National Executive Secretary of the Socialist Party in 1919 and was the leading vote-getter in the race, which was ultimately annulled by the outgoing NEC on account of purported voting irregularities by the language federations of the party.

Wagenknecht and the Left Wing attempted to establish themselves as a parallel National Executive Committee despite the outgoing NEC's refusal to officially tabulate the vote, and the "new NEC" met one time in Chicago in August in an attempt to assert authority over the party apparatus, with Wagenknecht declaring himself "Executive Secretary Pro Tem." This effort was rebuffed by sitting Executive Secretary Adolph Germer and the party's Regular faction, however.

=== Communist Labor Party founder ===
Wagenknecht was not eligible to participate in the seminal 1919 Emergency National Convention of the SPA owing to the expulsion of the Socialist Party of Ohio from the party for their endorsement of the Left Wing Manifesto, which was portrayed by the Regular-dominated outgoing NEC as an automatic violation of the party constitution. Consequently, Wagenknecht cleverly rented a room downstairs from the SPA's convention at Machinists' Hall in Chicago and ran a parallel convention to the official one upstairs — a gathering which was joined by a steady stream of disgruntled Left Wing delegates bolting from the official gathering. Wagenknecht presided over this alternative convention, which on August 31, 1919, declared itself to be the founding convention of the Communist Labor Party. This convention elected Wagenknecht as National Secretary of the CLP, a role which he maintained throughout the organization's brief history.

The CLP was devastated by the raids of the US Department of Justice headed by A. Mitchell Palmer and his Special Assistant, J. Edgar Hoover, coordinated actions which began in the fall of 1919 and reached their zenith with a mass operation conducted during the evening of Jan. 1/2, 1919. The CLP was driven underground, local organizations broken up into secret "groups" of no more than 10 members who met furtively, using pseudonyms and attempting to avoid detection by the authorities. Wagenknecht was known variously as "Paul Holt," "A.B. Mayer," "A.B. Martin," and "U.P. Duffy" during the "underground years" of 1920–1923.

In April 1920, Wagenknecht's former prisonmate turned Executive Secretary rival C. E. Ruthenberg left the Communist Party of America (CPA) along with a number of co-thinkers and a big portion of the organization's cash. This Ruthenberg-CPA and Wagenknecht's CLP finally determined to achieve the organizational unity demanded by the Communist International at a secret convention held at Bridgman, Michigan, at the end of May 1920. This gathering determined to retain Wagenknecht as executive secretary of the new organization, called the United Communist Party (UCP), assigning the important role of Editor of the party's official newspaper, The Communist, to Ruthenberg. Wagenknecht also served on the UCP's Editorial Committee and on the three-member Unity Committee which continued to negotiate a merger agreement with the remaining CPA organization, headed by Charles Dirba. Unity with this group was finally forged at a May 1921 secret convention held at the Overlook Mountain House hotel near Woodstock, New York. Confusingly, this new unified organization retained the name "Communist Party of America," the same moniker shared by the Dirba majority and the Ruthenberg minority organizations.

The merger of the UCP meant the end of Wagenknecht's tenure as an executive secretary. From June 1921, Wagenknecht served as the Manager of the unified CPA's "legal" weekly newspaper, The Toiler, with Wagenknecht's brother-in-law, Elmer Allison editing the publication. In 1922, a legal "mass organization" called the Friends of Soviet Russia was established by the unified CPA, and Wagenknecht was named by the CEC of the party to head it. He also sat on the Central Executive Committees of the (underground) unified CPA and the party's "Legal Political Party" — the Workers Party of America (WPA) — from 1922 to 1923, when the underground party was finally dissolved. Thereafter, Wagenknecht was made the District Organizer for the tiny Wilkes Barre district of the WPA, with this job beginning in May 1923.

=== Communist Party functionary ===
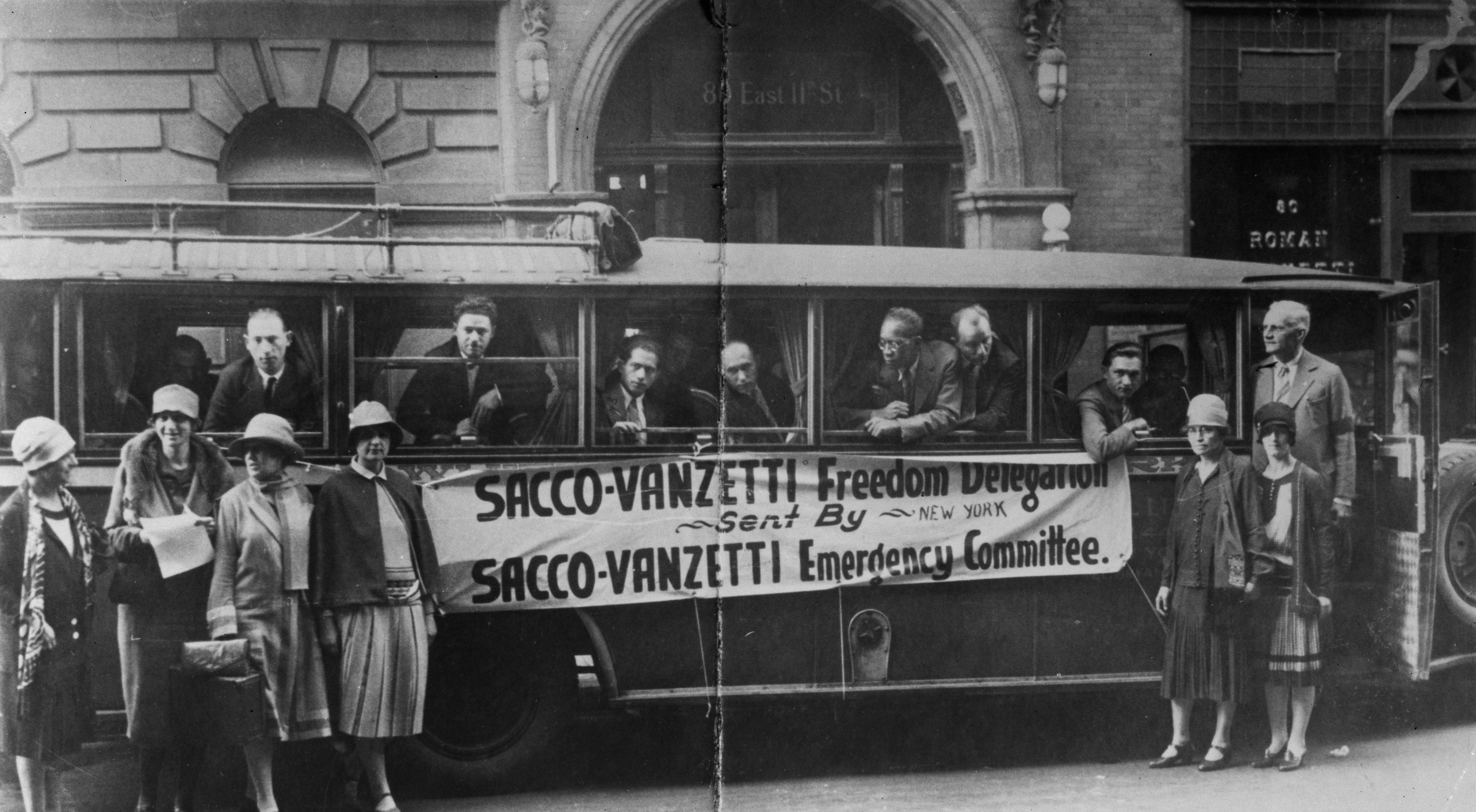
Wagenknecht (far right) as part of a "Freedom Delegation" in support of Sacco and Vanzetti, August 1927

In 1924, Wagenknecht worked as a "Director of Special Campaigns" for the WPA, managing the fund-raising drive for the Daily Worker. Wagenknecht seems to have been difficult for both the Pepper-Ruthenberg-Lovestone and the Foster-Cannon-Lore factions and was shipped off to the Philippines to organize trade unions on behalf of the Red International of Labor Unions (RILU) late in 1924.

Later, Wagenknecht turned his hand to film, producing and co-starring in the silent film The Passaic Textile Strike, a semi-fictional account of the 1926 strike of 16,000 textile workers at Passaic, New Jersey, initially led by Wagenknecht and other American Marxist and Communist leaders.

Wagenknecht was touted for the role of business manager of the Daily Worker in the last years of the 1920s as the "most competent comrade for the position" by the minority faction headed by William Z. Foster and Alexander Bittelman. He was bypassed for the responsible position by a rapid succession of three others, however, who were selected for the post based upon their loyalty to the majority faction headed by Executive Secretary Jay Lovestone. Lovestone singled his factional opponent Wagenknecht out for special criticism in the last pamphlet he published as head of the CPUSA, Pages from Party History, recalling Wagenknecht's "hesitation" and "wavering" over the "fundamental principle of splitting the Socialist Party" a decade earlier.

Wagenknecht was the executive secretary of the American section of the Comintern aid organization Workers International Relief in 1929 — a job which in June took him to Gastonia, North Carolina, to the scene of the acrimonious Loray Mill Strike. Wagenknecht was attempting to reestablish a tent colony of mill strikers which had been disbursed by local authorities. Instead, on June 12, Wagenknecht was himself arrested.

Wagenknecht separated from his wife Hortense in 1930 and was finally divorced in January 1948.

With the coming of the Great Depression in 1929 and its deepening in subsequent years, the CPUSA began placing great emphasis on attempting to organize and mobilize unemployed workers. In November 1930, Wagenknecht was placed in charge of the National Campaign Committee for Unemployment Insurance, a single-purpose mass organization of the party aimed at organizing around the issue of unemployment insurance. The group conducted a massive petitioning campaign which rapidly gathered what were claimed to be 1.4 million signatures, which Wagenknecht and a delegation of 140 presented to Congress on February 10, 1931. The petition caused the House of Representatives to take up the matters of the Communists and their issue on the floor the next day, with conservatives arguing for efforts to deport alien radicals from America, while progressives such as Rep. Fiorello LaGuardia of New York argued in favor of unemployment insurance legislation as a means of curbing revolutionary sentiment.

In 1933, Wagenknecht served as the executive secretary of the National Committee to Aid Victims of German Fascism, a CP-sponsored "mass organization." In the fall of that year he ran for the New York State Assembly in District 14.

Wagenknecht was the State Chairman of the Communist Party in Missouri from 1938 to 1941 and in Illinois from 1941 to 1945.

=== Death and legacy ===
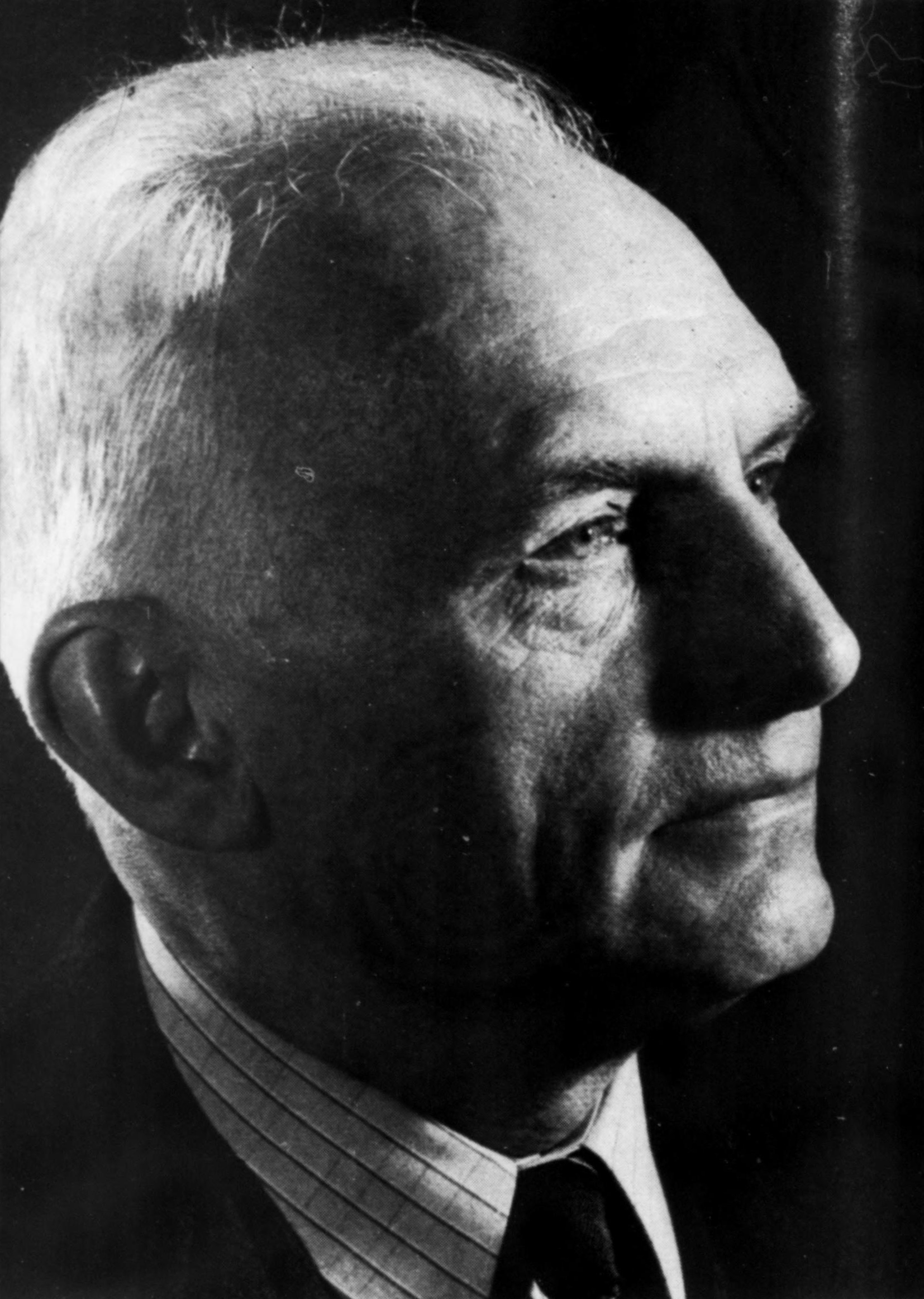
Wagenknecht later in life

Wagenknecht remained a Communist Party loyalist for the rest of his days, dying on August 26, 1956 in Illinois and honored at his passing with a full-page photograph inside the front cover of Political Affairs, the theoretical monthly of the Communist Party USA.

== Works ==
- "The Struggle Against Unemployment in the USA," International Press Correspondence, March 26, 1931, pp. 340–341.

== See also ==
- Socialist Party of Washington
