= Ecology (disambiguation) =

Ecology is the scientific study of the distribution and abundance of organisms and their interactions with their environment.

Ecology or Ecologist may also refer to:

== Publications ==
- Ecology (journal)
- Journal of Ecology
- The Ecologist, a British environmental magazine
- Ecology: Can We Survive Under Capitalism?
- Ecology: From Individuals to Ecosystems, a textbook

== Organisations ==
- Ecology Party, an early name for the Green Party in the UK
- Ecology Building Society
- Ecology movement, aimed at protecting the environment (similar to the environmental movement)

== Music ==
- Ecology (Rare Earth album), 1970
- Ecology (Mathematik album), 1999
- The Ecology, album by Fashawn 2014
- "The Ecology", song by Fashawn from Boy Meets World 2009
- "Mercy Mercy Me (The Ecology)", from Marvin Gaye's 1971 album What's Going On

== See also ==
- Environmentalism, a social and political movement often associated with ecology
- Eco (disambiguation)
