= Jack Stachel =

American Communist Party official (1900–1965)

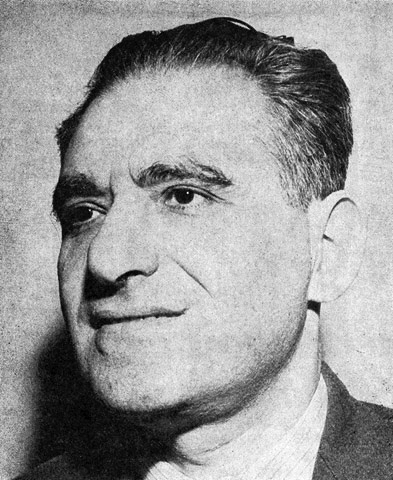
- Born: Jacob Abraham Satchel; January 18, 1900; Galicia, Austria-Hungary
- Died: December 31, 1965 (aged 65); New York City, U.S.
- Education: Cooper Union
- Known for: Serving a 5 year sentence under the Smith Act in 1949
- Political party: Socialist (before 1923); Communist (after 1923)
- Other political affiliations: Workers (1923–1929)

Jacob Abraham "Jack" Stachel (January 18, 1900 – December 31, 1965) was an American Communist functionary who was a top official in the Communist Party from the middle 1920s until his death in the middle 1960s. Stachel is best remembered as one of 11 Communist leaders convicted under the Smith Act in 1949, for which he served a sentence of five years in prison.

== Background ==
Jacob Stachel, known to all his contemporaries by his nickname "Jack," was born of ethnic Jewish parents on January 18, 1900 in Galicia, then part of the Austro-Hungarian Empire. His father, Moses/Moishe, emigrated to America in August 1910 and young Jacob arrived with his mother, Rose, and three siblings, Lena, Clara, and Max, in January 1911, landing in New York City and making a home there. His father was a naturalized citizen of the United States, on which basis Jack Stachel claimed American citizenship for himself.

Stachel attended public school in New York City, selling newspapers and working in restaurants to help support the family. He obtained 8 years of elementary schooling and 2 years of high school before leaving. Stachel furthered his education on his own time, attending various courses at the Cooper Union and other institutions in New York City from 1915 through 1921.

== Career ==
Stachel also briefly made his living as a "medicine man," a seller of patent medicine to passersby through sidewalk orations. He later learned the trade of hatmaking and was an active member of the Cap and Millinery Workers Union for several years dating from 1918.

=== Political rise ===
Stachel left the Socialist Party of America to join the Communist Party — then known as the Workers Party of America — in the fall of 1923.

During the second half of the 1920s, Stachel was a loyalist to the faction headed by C.E. Ruthenberg and Jay Lovestone.

In 1924, Stachel served as the District Organizer of the Young Workers League (YWL) for New York. He was also elected a member of the governing National Executive Committee of the YWL by that organizations 3rd Convention, held in October 1925.

During 1926 and 1927, Stachel acted as the Organizational Secretary of the Communist Party's important New York District, working there with District Organizer William Weinstone. Stachel was a close political ally of Weinstone in this period and he was won over to his mentor's idea of following a non-factional policy, cooperating with a third group headed by James P Cannon in an attempt to end the war between the Ruthenberg-Lovestone and the Foster-Bittelman factional groups. Factional leader Jim Cannon later lamented that "after several months of persistent effort Lovestone finally got Stachel back into line. But there was one brief period in the life of this man, which seemed to be otherwise devoted exclusively to vicious factionalism, when he responded to higher considerations of party interests."

Stachel was elected to the 37 member Central Executive Committee of the Workers (Communist) Party of America in 1926, retaining a seat on that body until 1940 amidst the factional tides. He was made a member of the party's national Agitation and Propaganda Committee in 1927.

Stachel married Bertha Zunser, the daughter of Russian Jewish immigrants, in June 1927. The couple had one son, who followed his parents into the Communist movement, teaching at the party's Jefferson School of Social Science from 1954 to 1956.

=== Association with Lovestone ===
Stachel was a top assistant to party leader Jay Lovestone in 1928, serving as Organizational Secretary of the Communist (Workers) Party. Stachel was also named the director of the party's pamphlet publishing house, Workers Library Publishers, from the time of its inception in 1928.

Historians Irving Howe and Lewis Coser have characterized Stachel in this period as the "chief assistant in Lovestone's less savory projects" and charge that he "planned and led a raid upon the private apartments of the Trotskyist leaders, rifled their files, and stole whatever was likely to burn well in the factional fires." The primary source of this information, former factional associate Benjamin Gitlow, notes that the burglary of James P. Cannon's residence was conducted by Stachel and a party comrade named Ravitch, business manager of the Daily Worker. The records stolen were then examined by Lovestone, John Pepper, and Stachel at Stachel's residence, with documents deemed damning subsequently published in the party press.

In 1929, when Lovestone went to Moscow as part of a 10-member committee to appeal the decision of the Comintern to end American factionalism by reassigning Lovestone and factional opponent Alexander Bittelman to Comintern work abroad, Lovestone entrusted Stachel and Robert Minor with a code that would enable them to seize the party's assets from any new party leadership should trouble develop during the trip to Russia. The pair had betrayed Lovestone, however, revealing the plot to others in the party — a decision which put the two back in good graces with the Communist International when the Lovestone group was purged from the party organization later in 1929.

=== Depression-era activity ===
Stachel was employed during 1930 as the CPUSA's District Organizer in Detroit, where he was briefly arrested along with the party's General Secretary, Earl Browder. He would return to New York City in 1931 to become the top assistant of William Z. Foster in running the party's trade union section, the Trade Union Unity League (TUUL). Foster found himself on the mend after a serious heart attack and stepped back from political life during the middle 1930s. Stachel filled the void as acting head of TUUL from 1932 through 1934, becoming the formal head of the organization in 1935.

Stachel's tenure as the acting head of TUUL coincided with a burst of activity of that organization in strike actions. According to the Communist Party's own reckoning, some 900,000 American workers went on strike in 1933, three times the total of the previous year. Of these, approximately 200,000 strikers were represented by unions linked to TUUL, compared to 250,000 represented by independent unions, and 450,000 represented by unions affiliated with the American Federation of Labor.

In 1933, with Earl Browder's ascension to the top position in the CPUSA, Stachel was taken into the top leadership of the party, along with Charles Krumbein (New York District Organizer), Bob Minor, Gil Green, and Herbert Benjamin.

=== Arrests and imprisonment ===
Stachel was actively sought by the federal government in the fall of 1939, in hopes that he might be compelled to testify against party leader Earl Browder who faced charges of passport fraud. Alerted to the government's desire to take him into custody, Stachel went underground, disappearing from the radar of the Federal Bureau of Investigation from October 1939 until February 1942, by which time America had entered the war and the political climate faced by the Communist Party had changed.

After his reappearance, Stachel was made Associate Editor of the Communist Party's English-language newspaper, the Daily Worker — a post in which he remained until October 1945. Following his departure from the Daily Worker, Stachel was appointed Chairman of the CPUSA's "Education, Agitation and Publications Department" (AgitProp), which job he formally held through 1950.

Following the end of World War II the brief period of cooperation between the Soviet Union and the United States came to an abrupt close and a new Cold War erupted, bringing with it renewed government efforts to hamstring the American Communist Party and its leaders. Stachel was arrested on June 1, 1948 on a deportation warrant obtained by the US Immigration and Naturalization Service, which charged him with illegal entry into the United States as well as membership in an organization which advocated the overthrow of the US government through "force and violence." He was released on bail that same day. This deportation matter was suspended the following month when a new and more onerous charge arose.

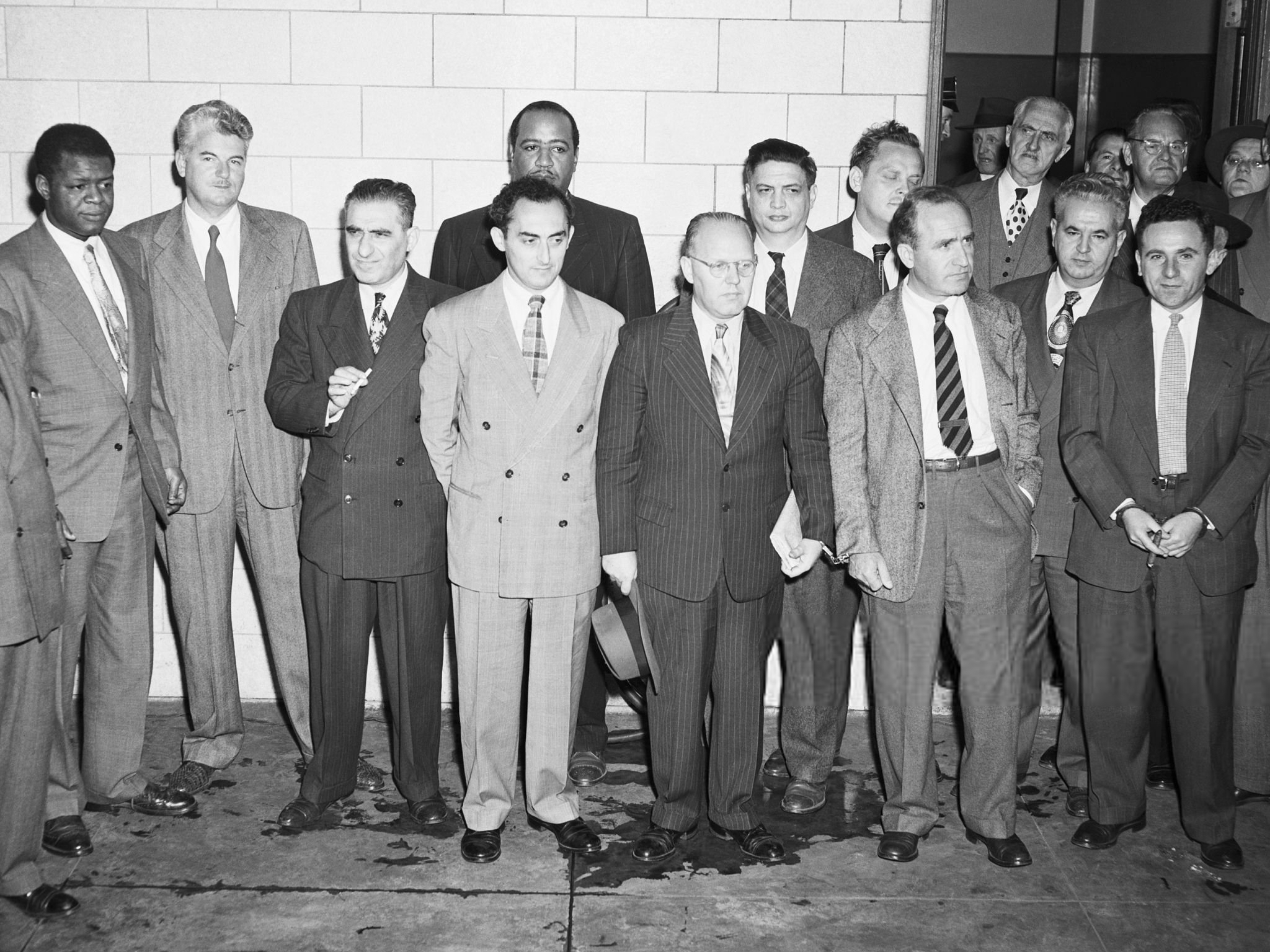
The Communists convicted in the Smith Act trials stand outside Foley Square Courthouse following the verdict, December 6, 1949. (L-R): Henry Winston, Eugene Dennis, Jack Stachel, Gil Green, Benjamin J. Davis Jr., John Williamson, Robert G. Thompson, Gus Hall, Irving Potash, Carl Winter and John Gates.

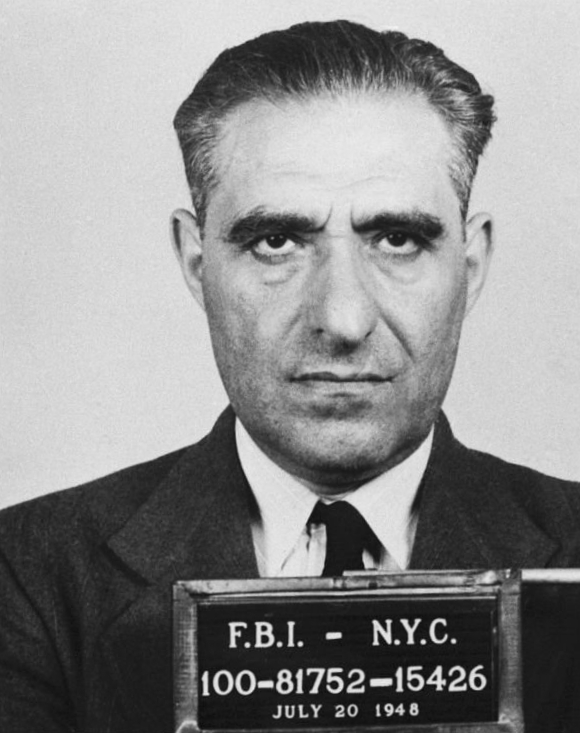
Stachel's FBI mugshot, 1948

On July 20, 1948, "stocky Jack Stachel" was one of 12 "kingpin Commies" (to borrow colorful contemporary terminology from Time magazine) indicted under the Smith Act for being "dedicated to the Marxist-Leninist principles of the overthrow and destruction of the Government...by force and violence." Although the Smith Act had been implemented eight years earlier for the altogether different purpose of fighting potential infiltration of America by secret Nazi saboteurs, in the fearful atmosphere of the Second Red Scare the existing law was used as a tool against national officials of the Communist Party. Prosecution of the ailing 67-year-old William Z. Foster was eventually dropped, but the 11 others, Jack Stachel among them, were convicted in 1949 and sentenced to five years in prison. Stachel was additionally slated for deportation proceedings upon his release — an action which proved unenforceable for geographic reasons.

Stachel suffered a heart attack of his own in January 1950, for which he was hospitalized in New York City for more than a month.

Stachel was imprisoned at Danbury Federal Penitentiary in Danbury, Connecticut from July 2, 1951 to March 1, 1955 in connection with his Smith Act conviction.

=== Career after prison ===
Upon his release Stachel was returned to the top leadership of the CPUSA, first as a member of the CPUSA's National Trade Union Commission. He was elected to the party's governing National Executive Committee in 1957. He also served as business manager and editor of The Worker, the renamed official party newspaper, from 1957.

During the Communist Party's period of internal discord following the so-called Secret Speech of Soviet leader Nikita Khrushchev, Stachel cast his lot with the CPUSA's pro-Moscow loyalists, including Eugene Dennis and Gus Hall. Stachel's loyalty was rewarded with elevation to the inner circle controlling the CPUSA's daily affairs, including promotion to the National Board in March 1961 and the National Administrative Committee in February 1962. Stachel also remained closely attached to The Worker as that publication's Press Director.

Stachel suffered from a heart ailment.

== Death ==
Jack Stachel died on December 31, 1965, of a heart and kidney ailment. He was less than three weeks short of his 66th birthday at the time of his death.

== Legacy ==
Following his death, Jack Stachel's life work was effusively extolled by CPUSA General Secretary Gus Hall in a five-page memorial in the party's monthly magazine, Political Affairs. Hall called Stachel "a model of a patriot" who "not only disapproved of evil, he fought it." Although he did not provide any concrete detail about either the social origins, personal life, written ideas, practical achievements, or political career of the little-known functionary, Hall nevertheless lauded Stachel as "one of the finest Marxist thinkers":

The name, Jack Stachel, shines brilliantly on the roll of honor of the heroes of the working class struggle. He will be remembered and honored the world over as one of the architects and builders of the new social order — socialism.
Jack Stachel's monument is the people and the better world he helped to build. His Hermitage is the thousands of young rebels who will try to match his greatness, who will emulate him because they saw in his life's work — a model.
