= Gil Green (communist) =

American politician (1906–1997)

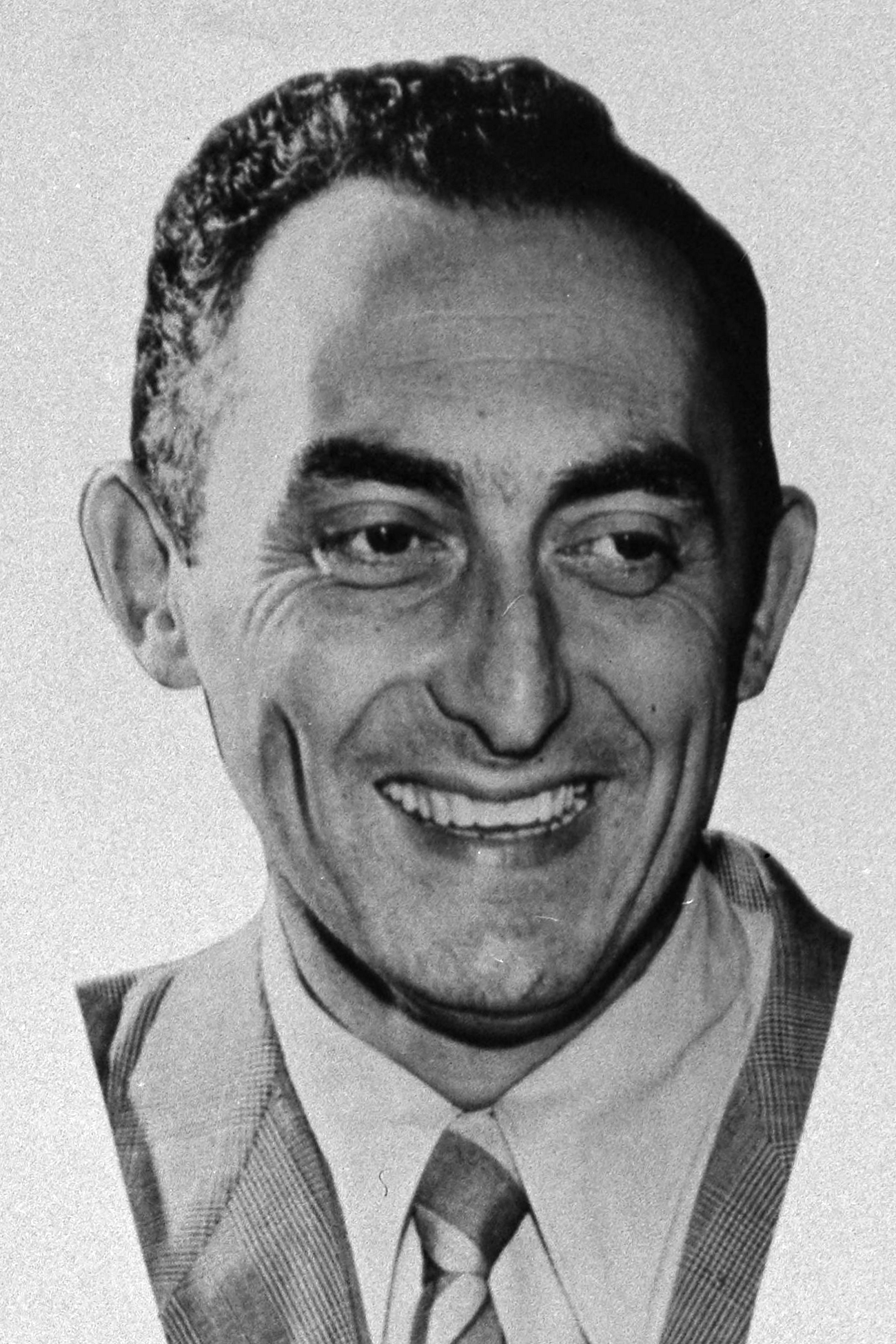
Green c. 1948

Gil Green (September 24, 1906 – May 4, 1997) was a leading figure in the Communist Party of the United States of America until 1991. He is best remembered as the leader of the party's youth section, the Young Communist League, during the tumultuous decade of the 1930s.

== Biography ==
=== Early years ===
Gil Green was born Gilbert Greenberg in Chicago. His parents were working class Jewish immigrants from the Russian Empire. Green's father, who worked as a tailor, died when Gil was about 10, leaving his mother to support the family as a garment worker.

Green was a successful student, graduating high school in the spring of 1924 as his class president and valedictorian.

=== Communist youth leader ===
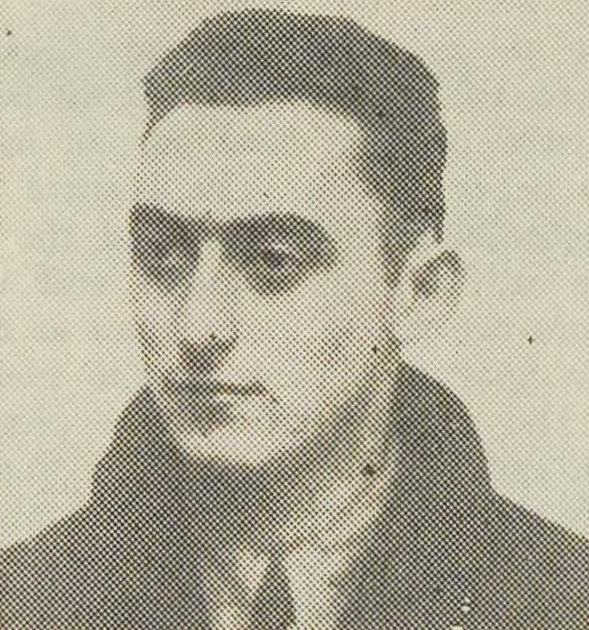
Green c. 1936

Green joined the Young Workers League, youth section of the Communist Party, USA, in 1924. He went to work full-time for the Young Workers (Communist) League in 1927 when he was named the organization's district organizer for Chicago.

In 1928 Green spent several months in Massachusetts raising funds for striking workers embroiled in the 1928 New Bedford textile strike. He was moved to New York City by the Communist Party the following year to work at national headquarters as a full-time youth section functionary. He worked as the editor of the party's youth newspaper, Young Worker, and in 1930 was named New York state organizer for the renamed Young Communist League (YCL). In 1931 he was promoted to the position of national secretary of the YCL. On January 15, 1931, William Albertson was to serve as secretary of a "Provisional Anti-War Youth Committee" of New York State to hold a rally for a Liebknecht Memorial and Anti-War Demonstration at the Star Casono at Park Avenue and 117 Street in Manhattan; CPUSA executive William Weinstone and YCL leader Green were to attend.

Green was named one of three communist youth leaders named to the Executive Committee of the Communist International in Moscow in 1935. In that capacity he attended the 6th World Congress of the Young Communist International (YCI), which elected him to the Executive Committee and Secretariat of that body.

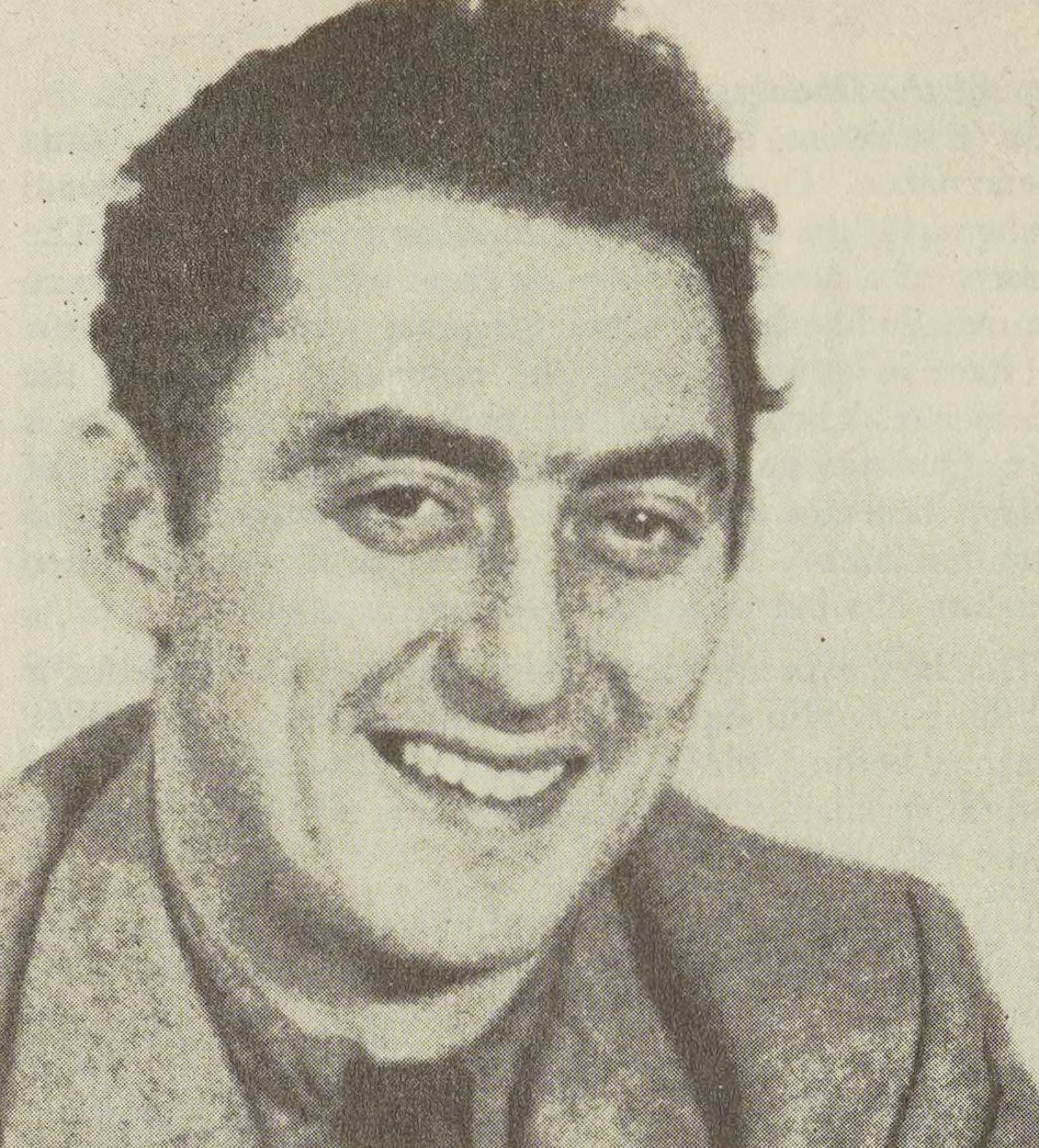
Green c. 1938

Green remained a prominent youth leader of the American Communist Party throughout the depression decade, attending the 1936 World Youth Congress held in Geneva and serving as one of three YCI delegates to a meeting with the rival Socialist Youth International that drew up a unity agreement with regards to aiding the Spanish Republic in the ongoing Spanish Civil War. Green was also a delegate to the 1938 World Youth Congress held in the United States at Vassar College.

=== Communist Party functionary ===
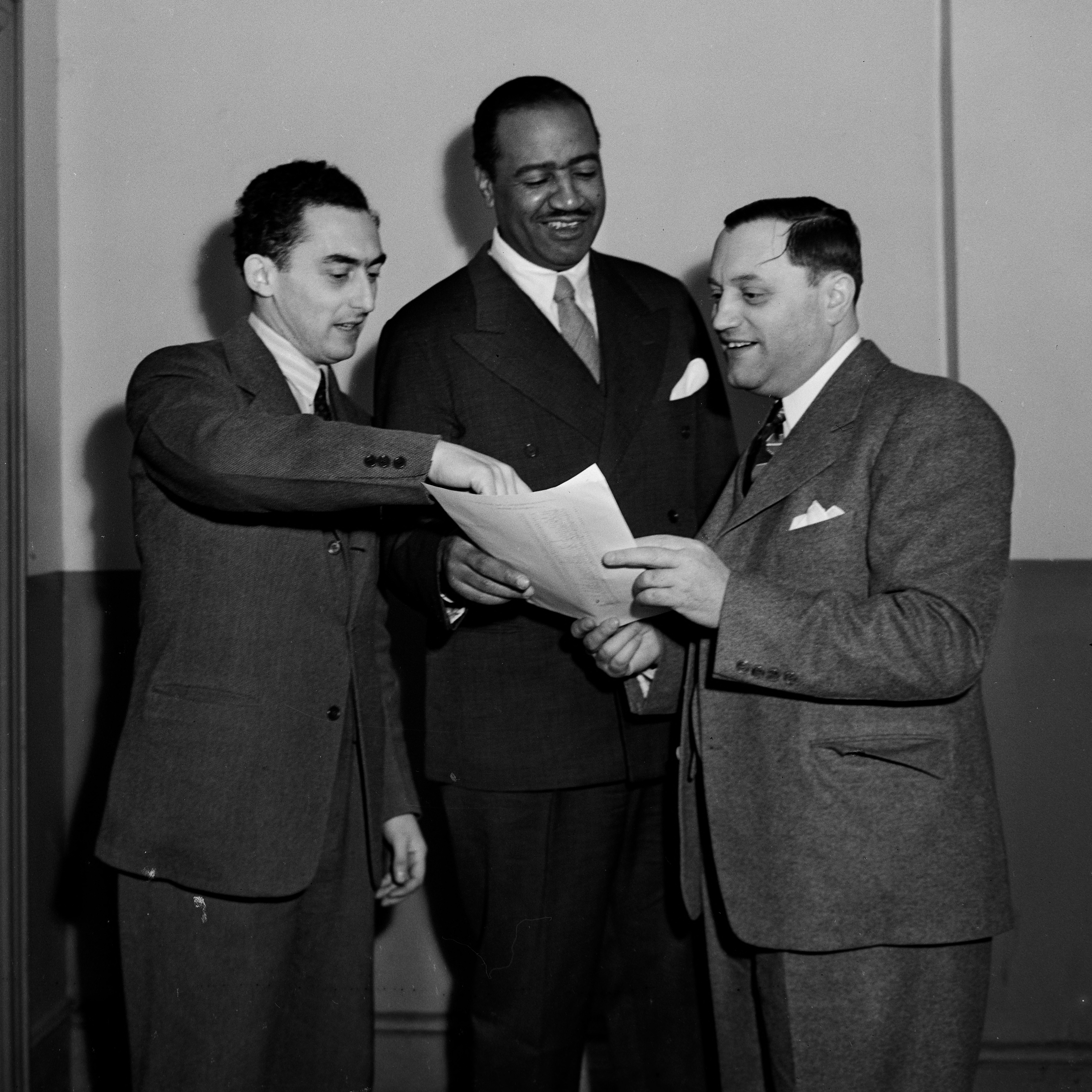
Green (left) with New York City Councilmen Benjamin J. Davis Jr. (center) and Peter Cacchione (right), March 1944

Leaving the communist youth movement at the end of the decade, Green was selected as a member of the National Board of the Communist Party, USA. He served as the party's top official, district organizer, of the key party district of New York from 1941 to 1945 and was vocal in his support of CPUSA General Secretary Earl Browder. In 1943, Green convinced Bella Dodd to join the Party openly, first by filling a local New York government position left open by Si Gerson (who was enlisting in the Army). Following the fall of his patron in 1945, Green was moved out of New York to become district organizer in Chicago to become the Illinois State Secretary of the CPUSA.

Green proved himself loyal to the new leadership of the CPUSA over the next two years and was returned to New York City and a place on the party's National Board in 1947.

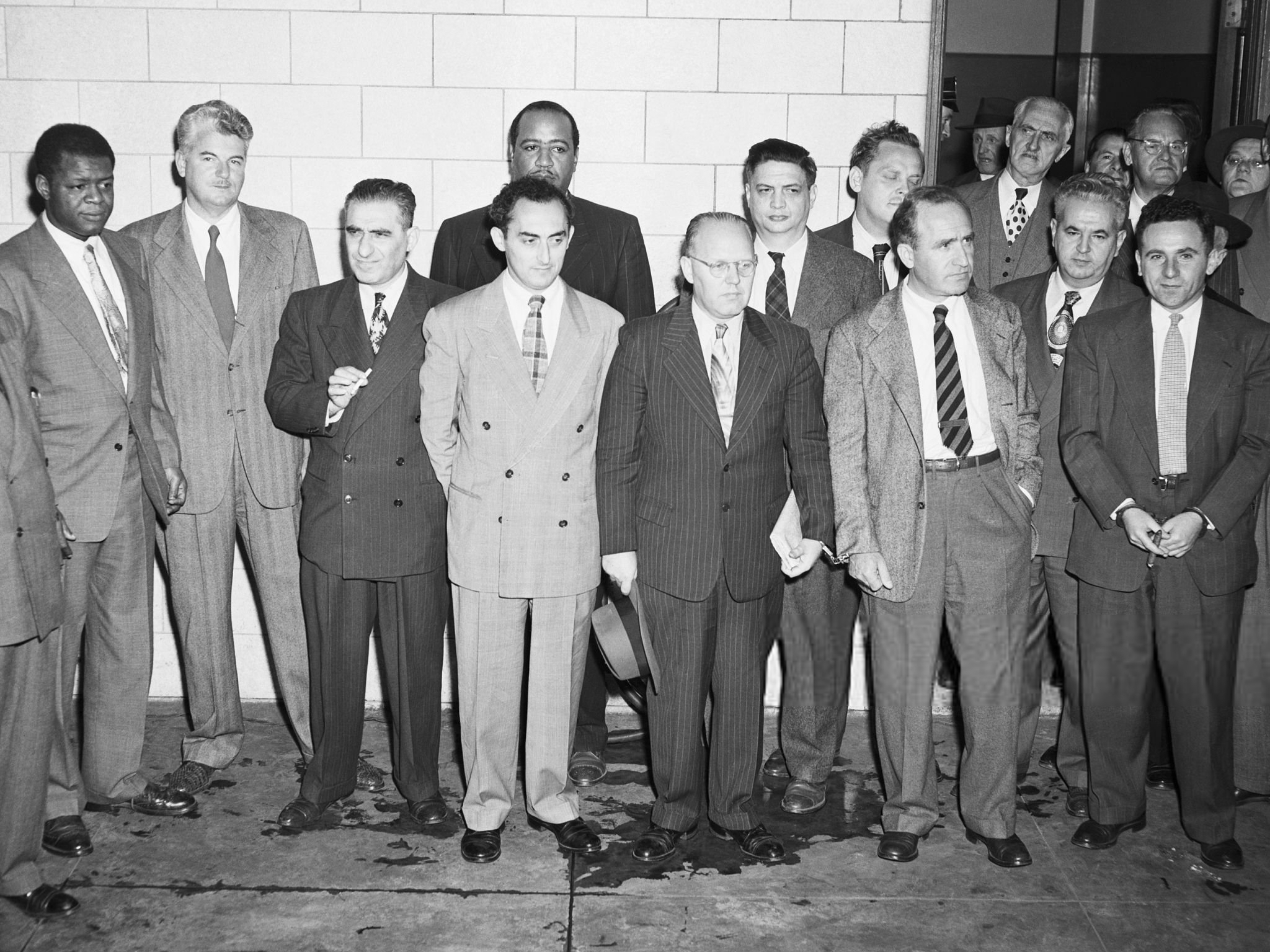
The Communists convicted in the Smith Act trials stand outside Foley Square Courthouse following the verdict, December 6, 1949. (L-R): Henry Winston, Eugene Dennis, Jack Stachel, Gil Green, Benjamin J. Davis Jr., John Williamson, Robert G. Thompson, Gus Hall, Irving Potash, Carl Winter and John Gates.

Green's status as a top official of the Communist Party made him a target for prosecution during the McCarthy era. Along with 11 other top party officials, Green was indicted in July 1948 under the Smith Act and convicted and sentenced to a long term of imprisonment following a lengthy 1949 trial. Unlike his co-defendants Green became a fugitive from justice following the Supreme Court's decision to uphold the verdict in 1951, remaining in the underground until voluntarily surrendering to authorities on February 27, 1956, Thereafter, Green was incarcerated in federal prison until July 29, 1961, when he was released early due to good behavior, although barred from association with known communists until expiration of his full sentence under terms of his release.

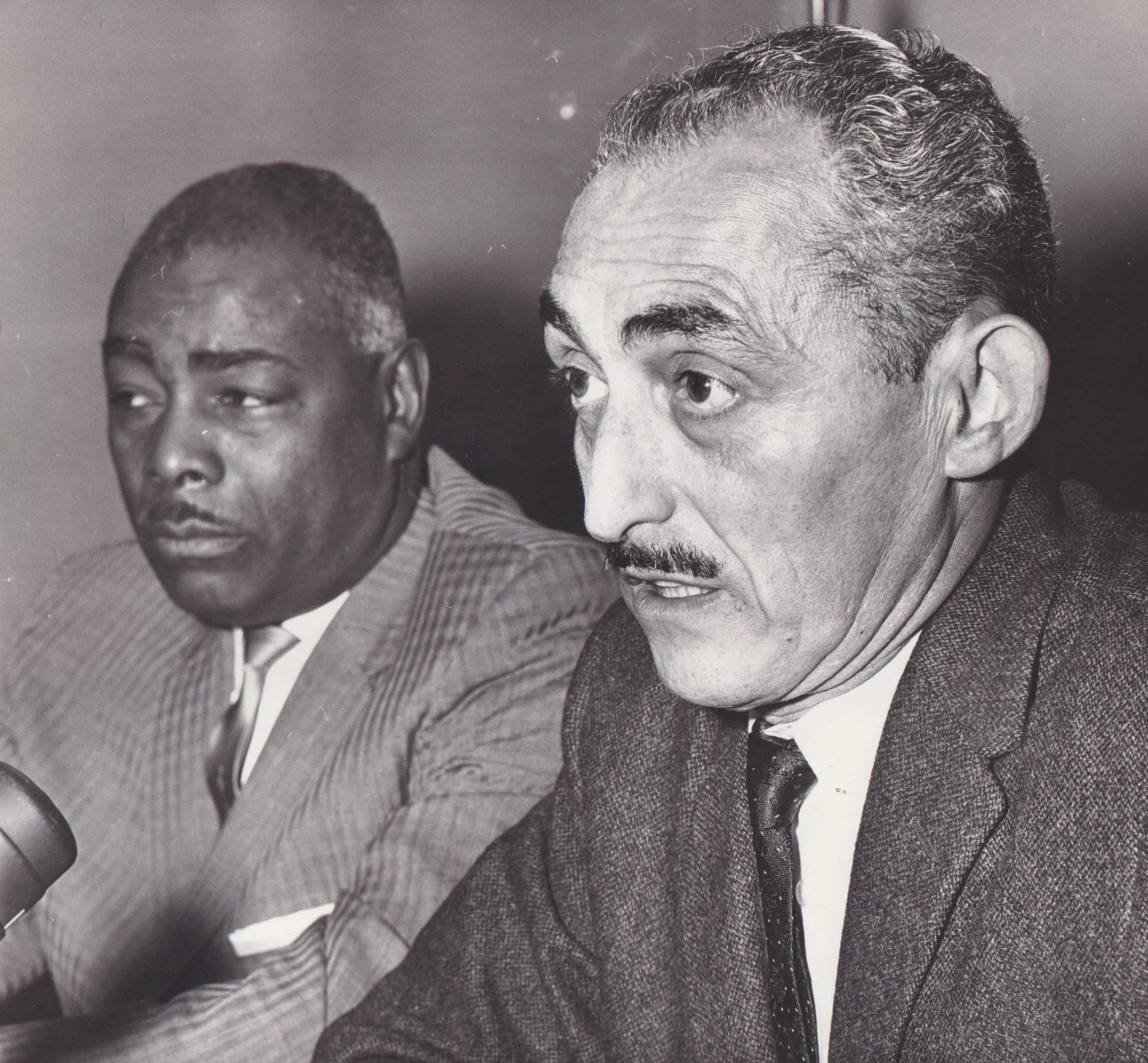
Green and Claude Lightfoot speak at a press conference, November 6, 1963

From 1966 Green again returned to prominence, this time as the Communist Party's Chairman in New York. He was actively involved in the political movement against the Vietnam War and by 1968 was again part of the CPUSA's governing National Committee. This return to top leadership proved short-lived, however, as Green ran afoul of hardline party leader Gus Hall: he joined a section of party members who vocally criticized the Warsaw Pact invasion of Czechoslovakia.

Although re-elected to the National Committee in 1969 despite his contention that the Soviet invasion of Czechoslovakia had been "a very serious blunder," Green later quit the National Committee, although he remained a member of the Communist Party for another two decades.

=== Later years, death, and legacy ===
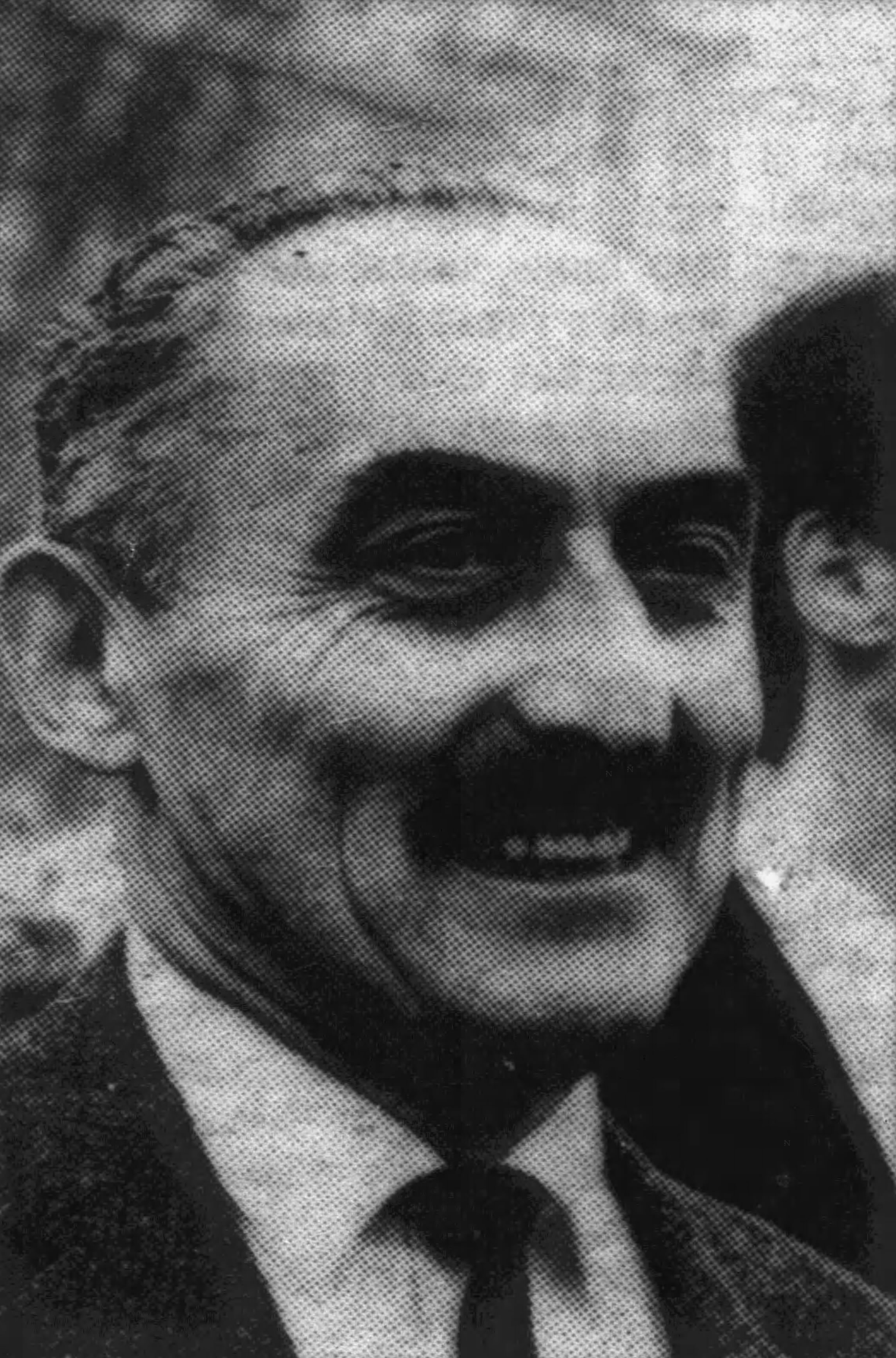
Green c. 1970

In 1991, following the collapse of communism in the Soviet Union, Green left the party and helped found the Committees of Correspondence for Democracy and Socialism.

Green died at a nursing home in Ann Arbor, Michigan on May 4, 1997, at the age of 90.

Michael Myerson sorted his papers. Green's papers reside at the Tamiment Library of New York University in New York City and at the Chicago History Museum in Chicago, IL.

== Works ==
- Marxism and the World Today. New York: New York State Committee, Communist Party, n.d.
- Youth Confronts the Blue Eagle. New York: Youth Publishers, November 1933.
- United We Stand: For Peace and Socialism. New York: Workers Library Publishers, 1935.
- Young Communists and the Unity of Youth: Speech Delivered at the 7th World Congress of the Communist International. New York : Youth Publishers, October 1935.
- Facing the 8th Convention of the Young Communist League: Report, Delivered Jan. 1, 1937. New York : Young Communist League, n.d. [1937].
- Make Your Dreams Come True: Report to the 8th National Convention of the Young Communist League, New York City, May 2, 1937. New York: Workers Library Publishers, June 1937.
- The truth about Soviet Russia. New York: New Age Publishers, March 1938.
- America Must Act Now! New York: Workers Library Publishers, November 1941.
- New York State's Wartime Election. New York: New York State Communist Party, September 1942.
- Marxism and the World Today. New York: New York State Committee, Communist Party, n.d. [1944?].
- The Enemy Forgotten. New York, International Publishers, 1956.
- Revolution Cuban Style: Impressions of a Recent Visit. New York, International Publishers, 1970.
- Terrorism: Is It Revolutionary? New York: New Outlook Publishers, 1970.
- The New Radicalism: Anarchist or Marxist? New York: International Publishers, 1971.
- What's happening to labor. New York: International Publishers, 1976.
- Portugal's Revolution. New York: International Publishers, 1976.
- Cuba at 25: The Continuing Revolution. New York: International Publishers, 1983.
- Cold War Fugitive: A Personal Story of the McCarthy Years. New York: International Publishers, 1984.
