= Henry Winston =

American communist (1911–1986)

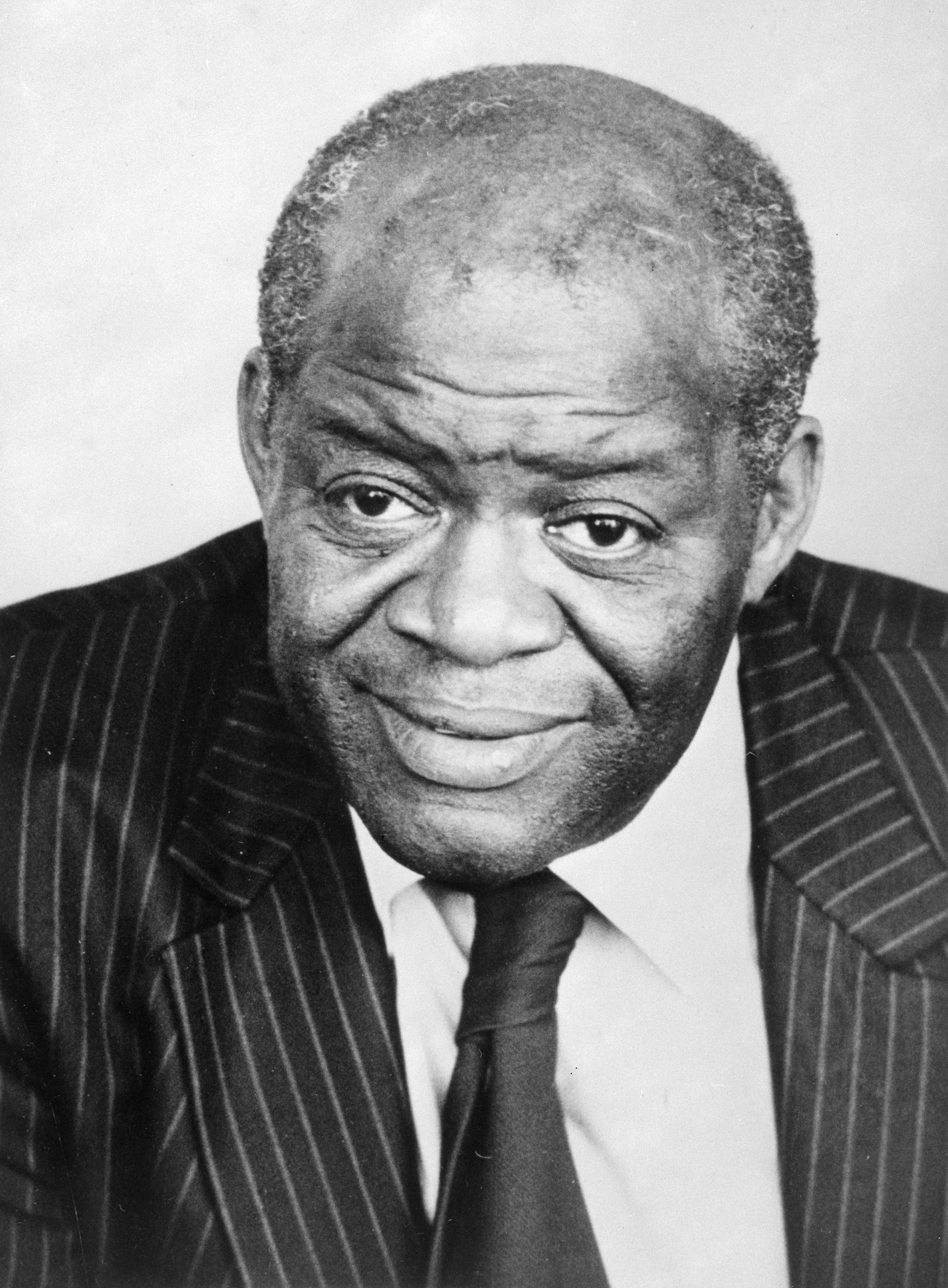
- Winston c. 1973

Chairman of the National Committee of the Communist Party USA
- In office June 26, 1966 – December 13, 1986
- Preceded by: Elizabeth Gurley Flynn
- Succeeded by: Office abolished

Personal details
- Born: April 2, 1911 Hattiesburg, Mississippi, U.S.
- Died: December 13, 1986 (aged 75) Moscow, Soviet Union
- Party: Communist

Henry M. Winston (April 2, 1911 – December 13, 1986) was an African-American political leader and Marxist civil rights activist.

Winston, committed to equal rights and communism, was an advocate of civil rights for African Americans decades before the idea of racial equality emerged as a mainstream current of American political thought. Winston was left permanently blind as a result of being denied medical treatment by the US Government while he was imprisoned for his communist beliefs.

An early member of the Communist Party USA (CPUSA), Winston was elected to the party's National Board in 1936, serving as Chairman of the CPUSA from 1966 to 1986.

== Biography ==
=== Early life ===
He was born on April 2, 1911, to Joseph and Lucille Winston in Hattiesburg, Mississippi. Henry grew up there and in Kansas City, Missouri. The economic situation of the poor Winston family was troubling enough to force Henry to leave high school early. Though once again unemployed after the start of the Great Depression, Winston's organizational skills and intellect came to the fore when he took a position with the Kansas City Unemployed Council at 19.

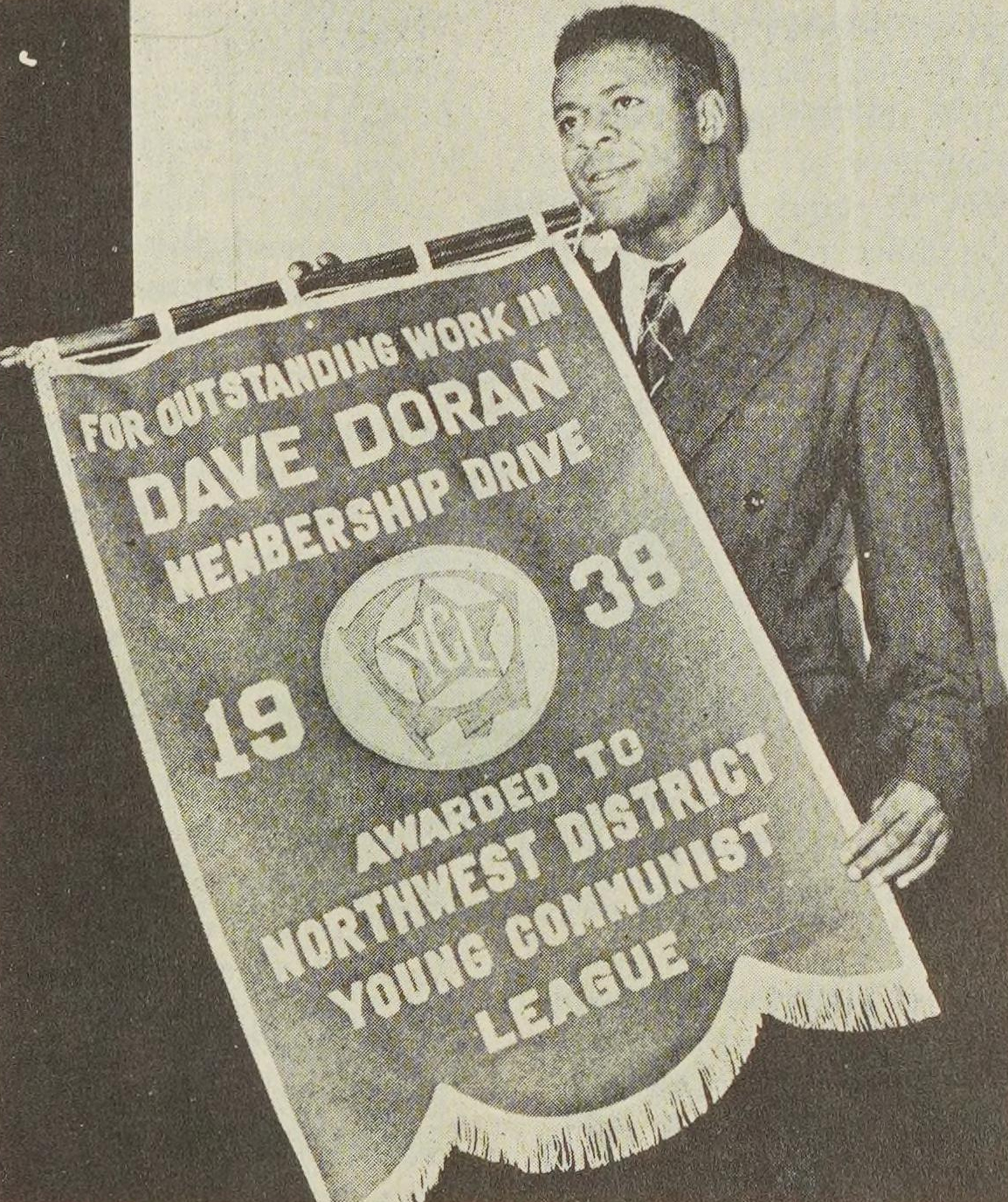
Winston presents the Dave Doran recruitment banner, named for the slain Abraham Lincoln Brigade commissar, 1938

By 1936, Winston was serving the Communist Party USA as both the national organizational secretary of the Young Communist League and a member of the Communist Party National Board.

As a high-ranking member of the Communist Party organization, Winston encouraged members of the party to sign up for military service to fight fascism in the Second World War. Winston himself served in the Army, participating in the liberation of France from Nazi occupation. He marked the war's end with an honorable discharge from the military.

=== Second Red Scare ===
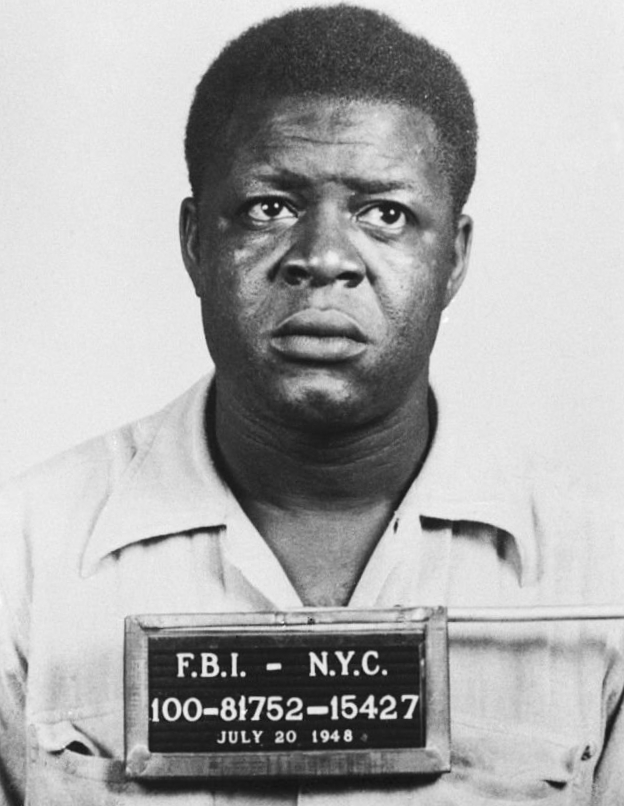
Winston's FBI mugshot, 1948

Back to political activity after his World War II discharge and the reorganization of the Party in 1946, Winston, along with the rest of the CPUSA leadership, was a victim of an early Cold War attempt by the American government to "decapitate" the Communists' leading ranks. In 1948, Winston, together with other notable leaders within the Communist movement, was brought to trial in the Foley Square trial on charges of violating the Smith Act for encouraging the overthrowing of the American government.

Unable to produce evidence that any of the leading party members had actually called for the armed overthrow of the American government, the prosecution, boosted by the American public's antipathy toward radical activists during the opening years of the Cold War, based its case on selective interpretation of quotations from the works of Karl Marx, Vladimir Lenin and other revolutionary figures of Marxism-Leninism. They also relied on the testimony of "witnesses" hired by the FBI. During the course of the trial the judge held several of the defendants and all of their counsel in contempt of court.

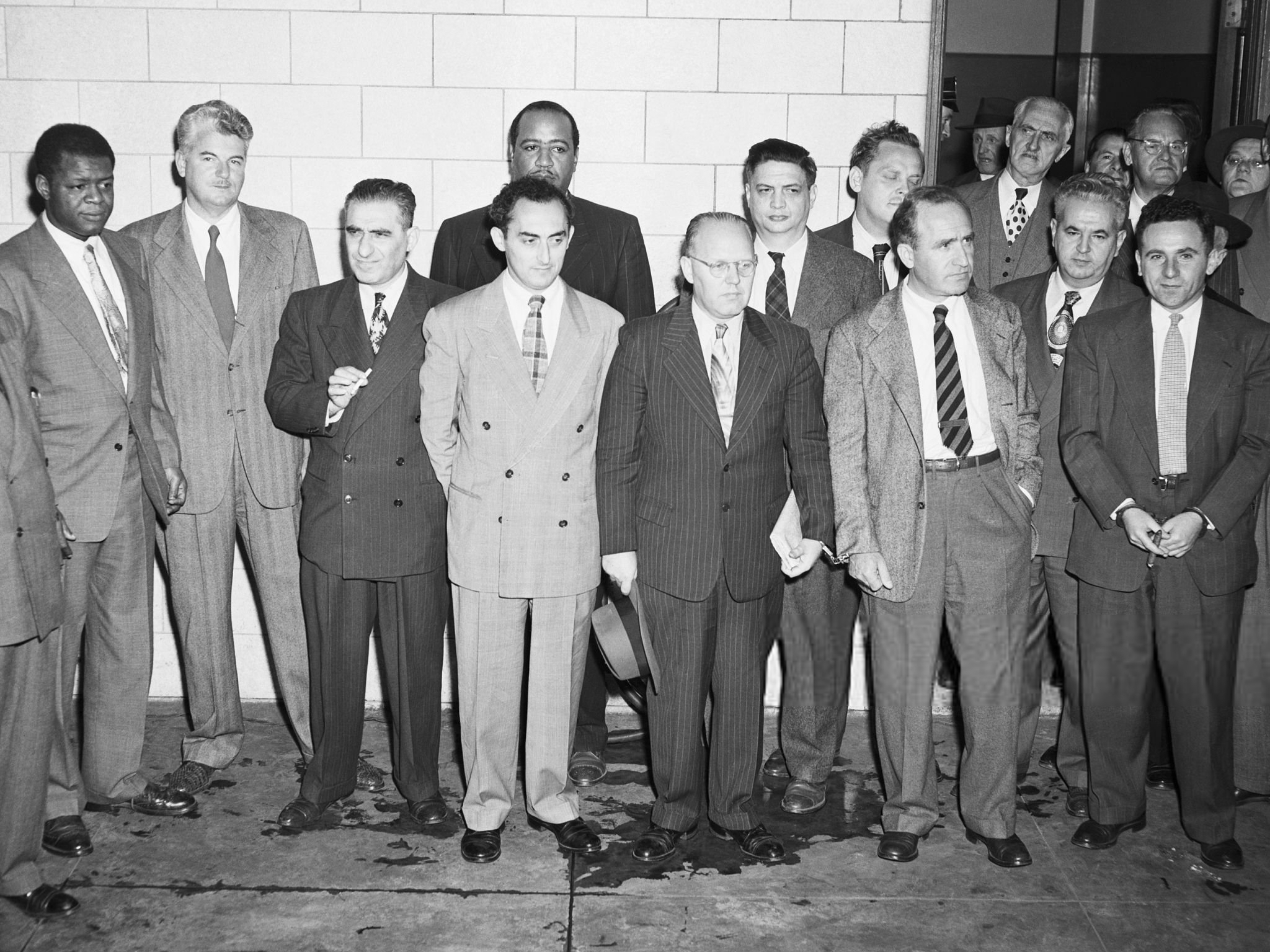
The Communists convicted in the Smith Act trials stand outside Foley Square Courthouse following the verdict, December 6, 1949. (L-R): Henry Winston, Eugene Dennis, Jack Stachel, Gil Green, Benjamin J. Davis Jr., John Williamson, Robert G. Thompson, Gus Hall, Irving Potash, Carl Winter and John Gates.

Convicted of revolutionary insurrection alongside the rest of the defendants for advocating the ideas of Marxism, Winston escaped while on bail. In disguise, traveling around the country under a false name, Winston was sheltered by people sympathetic to Marxism and leftist political work. Undeterred from maintaining his links with the party above-ground, Winston continued his activities from within the party's underground organization: his 1951 pamphlet on party organization, "What it Means to be a Communist," was produced by the Communist Party while Winston was still underground.

Following his surrender to federal authorities years later, Winston served out his sentence in Terre Haute, Indiana, remaining imprisoned, despite severe health problems, until his release in 1961.

Winston's state of health began to see a rapid deterioration throughout the late 1950s. By 1958, he began to suffer from headaches and dizzy spells; no adequate treatment was administered to him until 1960; by then, although a tumor was removed when he was transferred to a hospital New York, Winston was left permanently blind as a result of denied treatment. Winston's release, now sought even by anti-communist preachers and liberal activists, was refused.

Addressing President Kennedy in a 1961 debate, Comandante Fidel Castro, whose July 26 Revolution swept the Communists into power two years earlier, called for the release of Winston and other political prisoners.

Against the backdrop of both waves of protests from various quarters of the United States in addition to criticism from across the world, the Kennedy administration allowed Winston executive clemency, following which he was permitted to seek medical attention in Eastern Europe and the Soviet Union. The same year, the Supreme Court, in Noto v. United States (1961), put an end to the jailing of party leaders, having reversed a conviction under the membership clause because the evidence was insufficient to prove that the Party had engaged in unlawful advocacy:

[T]he mere abstract teaching of Communist theory, including the teaching of the moral propriety or even moral necessity for a resort to force and violence is not the same as preparing a group for violent action and steeling it to such action. There must be some substantial direct or circumstantial evidence of a call to violence now or in the future which is both sufficiently strong and sufficiently pervasive to lend color to the otherwise ambiguous theoretical material regarding Communist Party teaching, and to justify the inference that such a call to violence may fairly be imputed to the Party as a whole, and not merely to some narrow segment of it.

The legal recognition of the illegitimacy of the federal government's basis for the imprisonment of party activists was now complete. Although the party was seriously damaged by the repressive moves, aggressive party activity was now again possible.

=== Later life ===
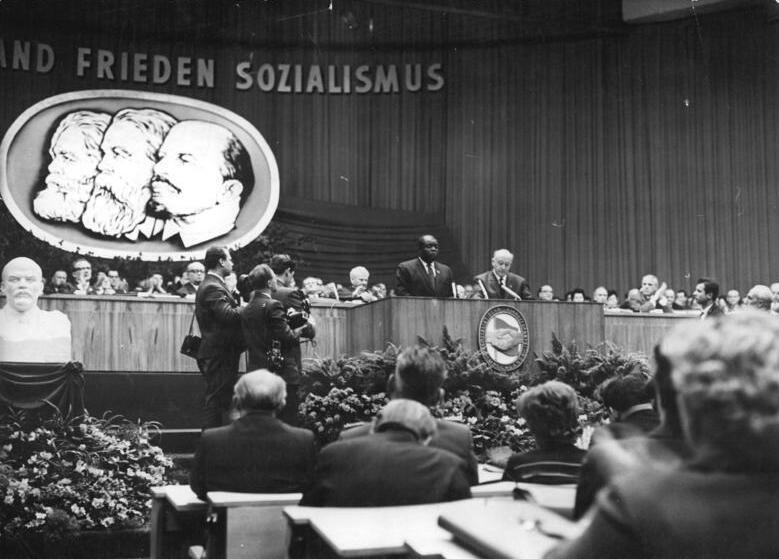
Winston speaks in East Berlin, 1963

Winston was elected CPUSA Chairman in 1966, sharing the running of the party organization with Gus Hall, the General Secretary.

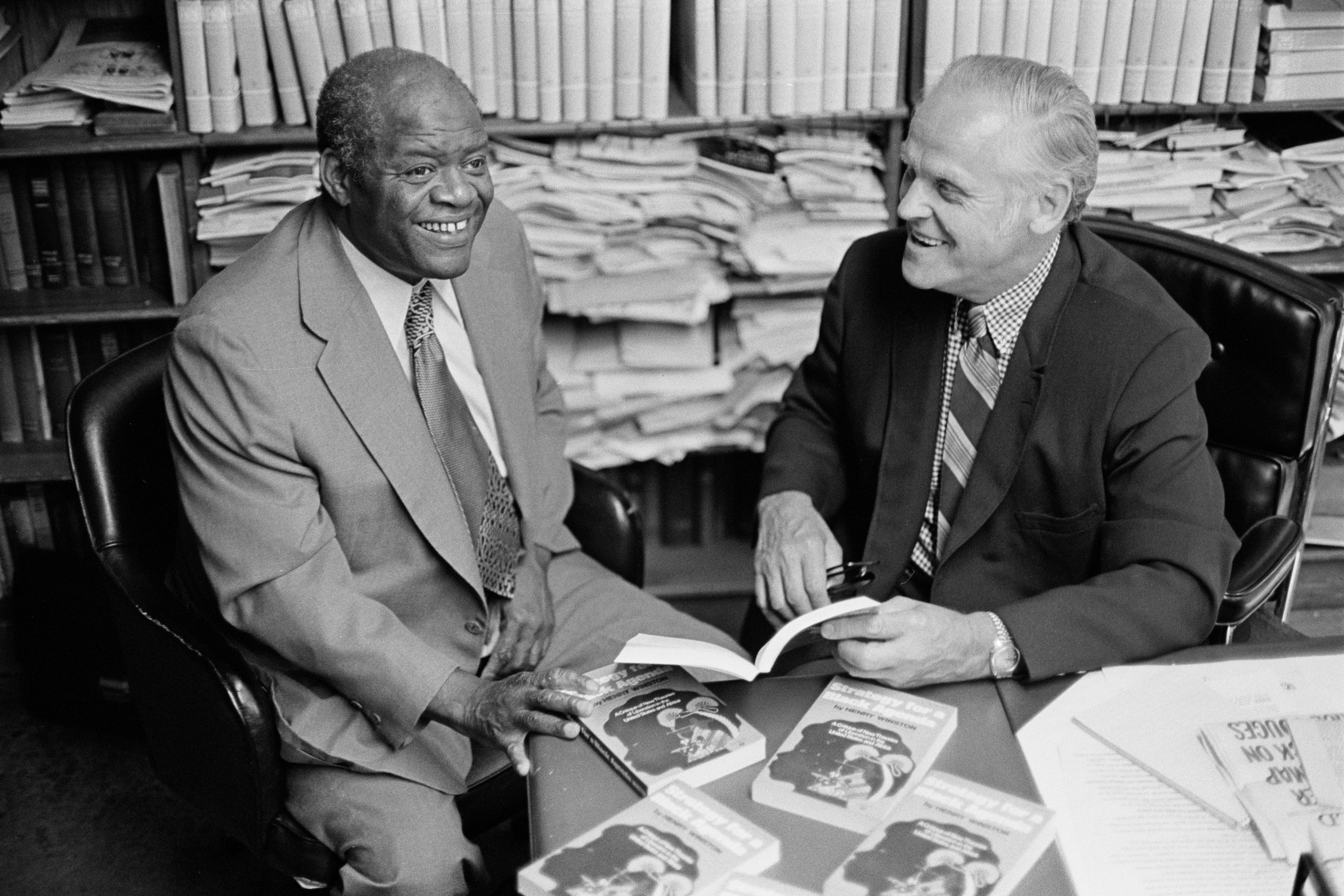
Winston and Gus Hall look over Winston's new book, Strategy for a Black Agenda, August 6, 1973

In 1964, he spoke to students at the University of Washington, after radical activists staged protests against the university's ban on "communist speakers."

The 1970s witnessed the publication of two books connecting the long-denied issue of African-American equality in America and the Communist philosophy of class struggle: Winston's Strategy for a Black Agenda (1973) and Class, Race, and Black Liberation (1977), which argued that the struggle for civil rights had reached the stage of fusion with the struggle for economic rights.

In a 1971 lecture to a seminar of Communist Party organizers, he said:

The giant industrial monopolies, the big banks and insurance companies, the financiers and landowners, all spawn racism and use it as one of their chief class weapons to maintain and defend their regime of exploitation and oppression, of enmity among peoples, of imperialist wars of aggression.

It follows that all democratic and antimonopoly forces, with the working class and Black liberation movement in the van, can effectively defend the interests of the vast majority of people only when they actively further the struggle against racism. This is an essential precondition for the development of a fighting alliance which will unite all democratic and antimonopoly [anticapitalist] forces in the country.

Marx wrote long ago that “labor in a white skin can never be free so long as labor in the black skin is branded.” This profound observation points up the fact that racism is the consciously employed weapon of the white imperialist oppressors, who use it to create division in the ranks of the working class. And Marx correctly suggests that white workers must take the lead in the struggle against racism. This is the path which can lead to unity of Black and white workers in struggle, which can achieve Black equality and a real improvement in the conditions of all workers.

A close ally of the South African Communist Party and actively involved in the American movement to end support for the United States' then-ally, apartheid South Africa, Winston proposed the following strategy as a backbone of principles for the U.S. sanctions and divestment movement against the apartheid regime:

- No economic, political or military relations whatsoever with the Vorster regime in the Republic of South Africa.
- Congress shall tax and the Treasury shall collect taxes on all profits made in South Africa at maximum rates without deductions for local tax paid.
- The Overseas Private Investment Corporation shall refuse to insure any new investments in South Africa and cancel all outstanding insurance on investments in the Republic of South Africa.
- The President shall instruct the Export-Import Bank and all other U.S. credit agencies to refuse all credits for business with the Republic of South Africa and instruct U.S. representatives of international lending agencies to oppose all creepartment shall denounce all existing investment, trade and commercial treaties with the Union of South Africa and dits to the Republic of South Africa or companies operating therein.
- The State Dthe President shall remove most favored nation treatment from South African goods.
- The immediate withdrawal of the sugar quota to the Republic of South Africa.

As Chairman of the CPUSA, Winston condemned the Reagan administration's nuclear build-up, increases in military spending at the expense of social welfare programs, and sponsorships of civil wars against leftist forces in Nicaragua and El Salvador.

On 1 April 1976 he was awarded the Order of the October Revolution.

Winston died on December 13, 1986, aged 75, in the Soviet Union, where he had again returned in search of medical treatment.

== Selected works ==
- Life Begins with Freedom, New York: New Age Publishers, 1937
- Character Building and Education in the Spirit of Socialism, New York: New Age Publishers, 1939 (A report to the ninth National Convention of the Young Communist League of the US, in New York, May 11 to 15, 1939)
- The Road to Liberation for the Negro People (with others), New York: Workers Library Publishers, 1939
- Old Jim Crow has got to go!, New York: New Age Publishers, 1941
- An open letter to all members of the Communist Party, New York: Communist Party, U.S.A. 1948
- What it Means to be a Communist, New Century Publishers, 1951
- Negro Liberation: a goal for all Americans (with Gus Hall, Claude Lightfoot and William L. Patterson), New York, New Currents Publishers 1964
- The Challenge of U.S. Neocolonialism, Prague: Peace and Socialism Publishers 1964; later published as New colonialism, U.S. style New York: New Outlook Publishers, 1965
- Negro-White Unity; key to full equality, Negro representation, economic advance of labor, black and white, New York: New Outlook Publishers, 1967
- Build the Communist Party, the party of the working class. Report to the 19th National Convention, Communist Party, U.S.A., April 30 – May 4, 1969, New York: New Outlook Publishers, 1969
- Henry Winston meets Angela Davis, New York: Communist Party, U.S.A. 1970
- Black Americans and the Middle East Conflict, New York: New Outlook Publishers 1970
- The Crisis of the Black Panther Party, New York, published for the occasion of the 2nd Annual Convention of the National Association of Black Students by the Communist Party, U.S.A., 1971
- The Meaning of San Rafael, New York: New Outlook Publishers 1971
- Fight Racism – for unity and progress, New York: New Outlook Publishers 1971
- The Politics of People's Action; the Communist Party in the '72 elections, New York: New Outlook Publishers, 1972
- Black and White – One Class, One Fight: the role of white workers in the struggle against racism, New York: New Outlook Publishers 1972 (Report to the 20th National Convention of the Communist Party, United States of America, February 20, 1972)
- Africa's Struggle for Freedom, the U.S.A. and the U.S.S.R., New York: New Outlook Publishers, 1972
- Strategy for a Black Agenda; a critique of new theories of liberation in the United States and Africa, New York: International Publishers, 1973
- A Marxist-Leninist critique of Roy Innis on community self-determination and Martin Kilson on education, New York: International Publishers 1973
- Class, Race, and Black Liberation, New York: International Publishers 1977
- Speech of Henry Winston, National Chairman, CPUSA: to the Central Committee/National Council Meeting May 29, 1983. New York: CPUSA, 1983.
