= Eugene Dennis =

American politician (1905–1961)

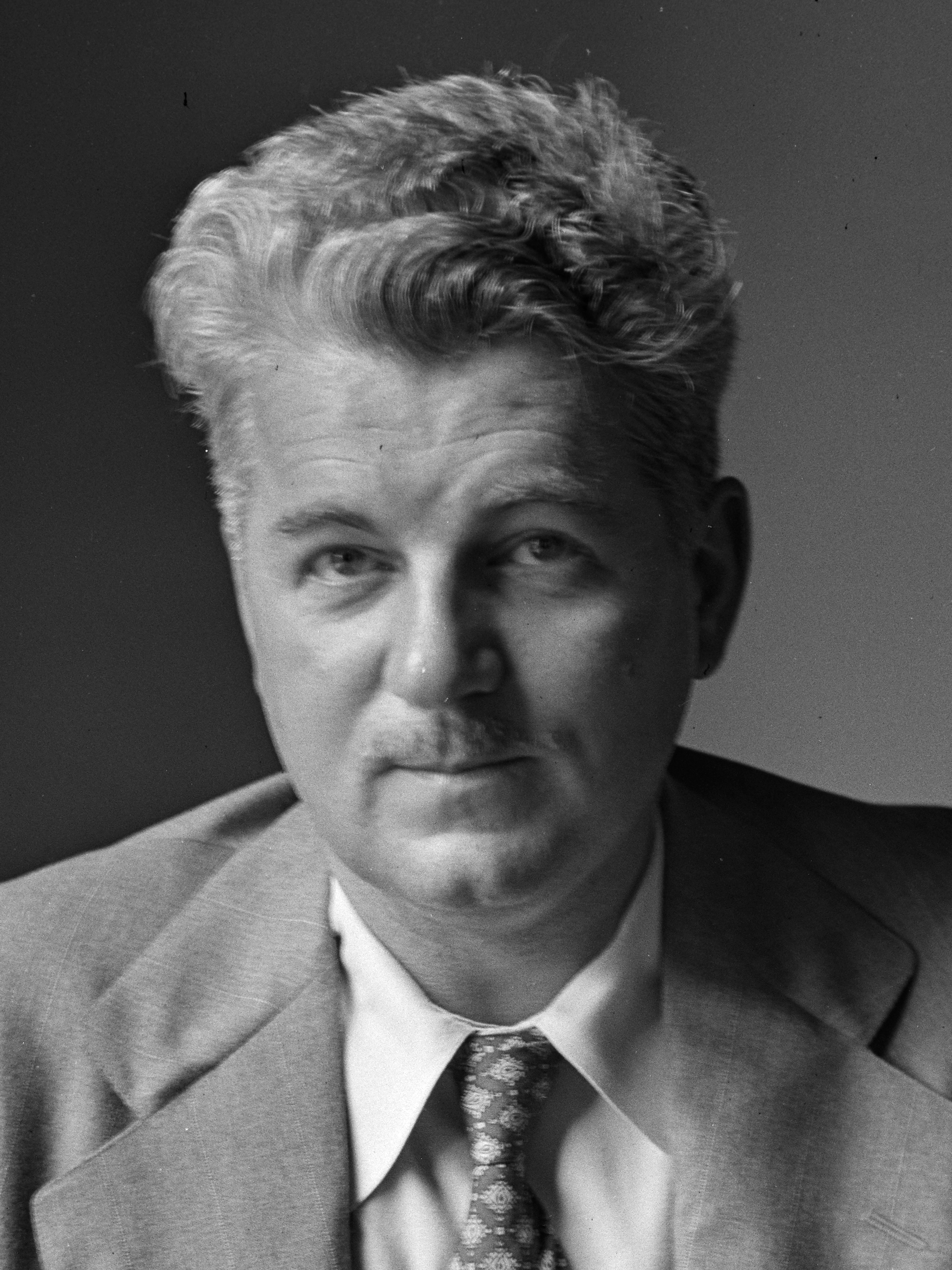
- Dennis c. 1954

General Secretary of the National Committee of the Communist Party USA
- In office February 12, 1957 – December 14, 1959
- Preceded by: William Z. Foster
- Succeeded by: Gus Hall

Chairman of the National Committee of the Communist Party USA
- In office July 29, 1945 – January 31, 1961
- Preceded by: William Z. Foster
- Succeeded by: Elizabeth Gurley Flynn

Personal details
- Born: Francis Xavier Waldron; August 10, 1905 Seattle, Washington, U.S.
- Died: January 31, 1961 (aged 55) New York City, U.S.
- Resting place: Forest Home Cemetery
- Party: Communist Party USA
- Domestic partner: Peggy Dennis (née Regina Karasick)
- Children: Tim; Eugene Jr.
- Occupation: Lumberjack, teamster, electrician, politician

Eugene Dennis (born Francis Xavier Waldron, also known as Tim Ryan; August 10, 1905 – January 31, 1961), was an American communist politician and union organizer, best remembered as the long-time leader of the Communist Party USA and as named party in Dennis v. United States, a famous McCarthy Era Supreme Court case.

== Biography ==
=== Early years ===
Francis Xavier Waldron was born on August 10, 1905, in Seattle, Washington. He worked in various jobs and was a member of the Industrial Workers of the World, for which he was active in California as a union organizer.

=== Political career ===
Waldron joined the Workers (Communist) Party in 1926.

In 1929, Waldron fled to the Soviet Union to avoid criminal charges for his political activities under the California Criminal Syndicalism Act.

Waldron returned to the United States in 1935 and assumed the pseudonym Eugene Dennis. Dennis became General Secretary of the party after the expulsion of Earl Browder and was a staunch supporter of the Moscow line.

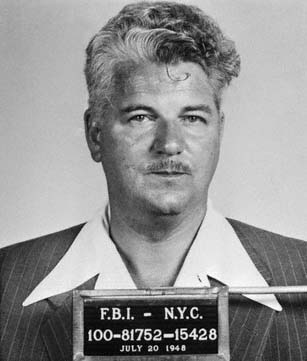
Dennis's FBI mugshot, 1948

On July 20, 1948, Dennis and eleven other party leaders, including Party Chairman William Z. Foster were arrested and charged under the Alien Registration Act. Foster was not prosecuted due to ill health.

As Dennis and his co-accused had never openly called for the violent overthrow of the United States government, the prosecution depended on passages from the works of Karl Marx and Vladimir Lenin that advocated revolutionary violence and on the testimony of former members of the party who claimed Dennis and others had privately advocated the use of violence.

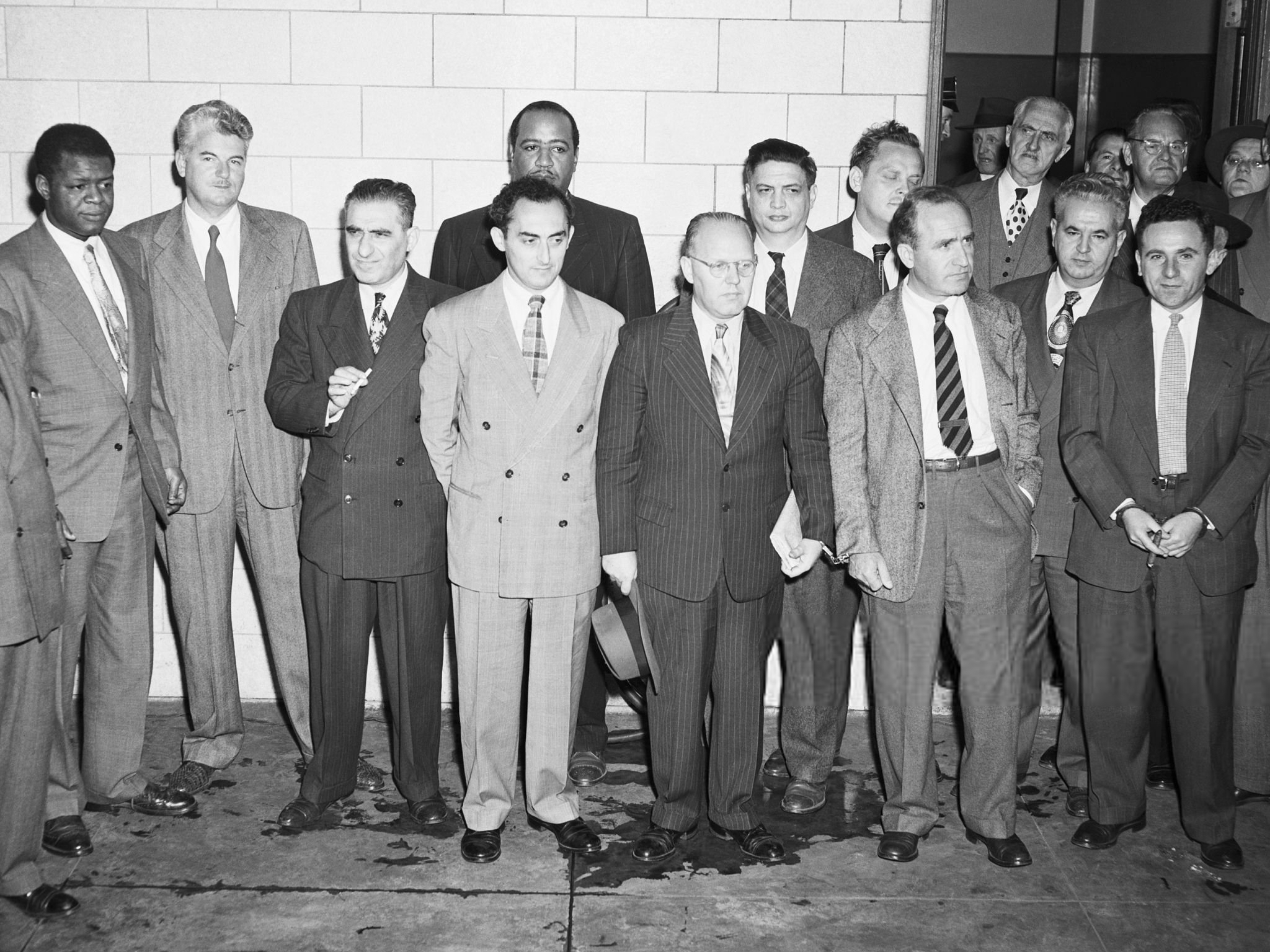
The Communists convicted in the Smith Act trials stand outside Foley Square Courthouse following the verdict, December 6, 1949. (L-R): Henry Winston, Eugene Dennis, Jack Stachel, Gil Green, Benjamin J. Davis Jr., John Williamson, Robert G. Thompson, Gus Hall, Irving Potash, Carl Winter and John Gates.

After a nine-month-long trial and the imprisonment of the defense lawyers for contempt of court, Dennis and his co-defendants were found guilty and sentenced to five years imprisonment. They appealed to the Supreme Court of the United States, which ruled 6–2 against the defendants on June 4, 1951, in Dennis v. United States, 341 U.S. 494 (1951). The Court later scaled back its Dennis opinion in Yates v. United States and rendered the broad conspiracy provisions of the Smith Act unenforceable. Eugene Dennis was imprisoned in the years 1951–1955, according to the verdict in his case.

Dennis remained General Secretary until 1959 when he succeeded Foster as party chairman and held that position until his death in 1961.

=== Espionage connections ===
Though never charged with any act of espionage, Dennis was identified in the Venona project as being a source for Soviet intelligence in the United States during World War II. In the transcripts, Dennis is referenced as a contact for a group of concealed Communists in the Office of Strategic Services and the Office of War Information.

Dennis is referenced in the following Venona transcripts:

- 708 KGB Moscow to Mexico City, 8 December 1944
- 1714 KGB New York to Moscow, 5 December 1944
- 55 KGB New York to Moscow, 15 January 1945

=== Death ===
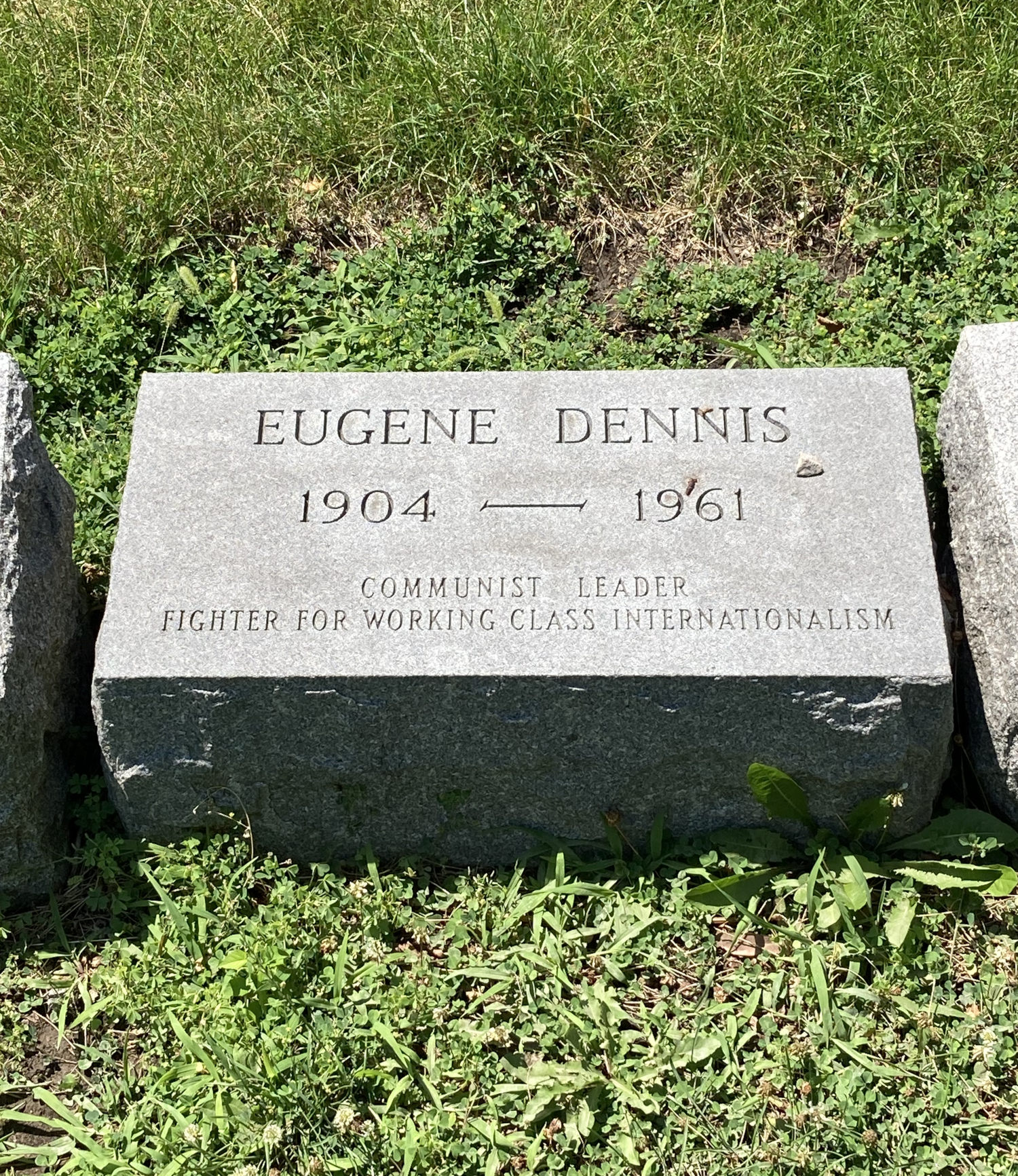
Dennis's grave at Forest Home Cemetery

Dennis died of cancer at Mount Sinai Hospital on January 31, 1961.

He was buried at the Waldheim Cemetery (now Forest Home Cemetery) in Forest Park, Illinois.

== Writings ==
- The elections and the outlook for national unity, New York, Workers Library Publishers, 1944.
- America at the crossroads: postwar problems and communist policy, New York, New century publishers, 1945.
- Marxism-Leninism vs. revisionism, New York, New Century Publishers, 1946 (with William Z. Foster, Jacques Duclos, and John Williamson; foreword by Max Weiss).
- The people against the trusts; build a democratic front to defeat reaction now and win a people’s victory in 1948, New York, New Century Publishers, 1946.
- What America faces: the new war danger and the struggle for peace, democracy, and economic security, New York, New century publishers, 1946.
- Let the people know the truth about the Communists which the un-American committee tried to suppress, New York, New century publishers, 1947.
- Eugene Dennis indicts the Wall Street conspirators, New York, National Office, Communist Party, 1948.
- Ideas they cannot jail, New York, International Publishers, 1950.
- Letters from prison. Selected by Peggy Dennis, New York, International Publishers, 1956.
- The Communists take a new look, New York, New Century, 1956.

== Footnotes ==
Party political offices
Preceded by Earl Browder	General Secretary of the CPUSA; 1957–1959	Succeeded by Gus Hall
