= Ecology: Can We Survive Under Capitalism? =

- Author: Gus Hall
- Language: English
- Published: 1972 (International Publishers)
- Publication place: United States

Ecology: Can We Survive Under Capitalism? is a book by Gus Hall, published in 1972 by International Publishers.

== Reception ==
The book received reviews from publications including Ecology Law Quarterly and Labour Monthly.

A review from Labour Monthly written by John Moss stated that "A book on ecology written by the general secretary of a political party is an event in itself, and I cannot recall another, not in this country anyway… At a time when there are so many books about the effects of pollution, this one that explains so clearly its causes, and the root and branch cure of socialism is refreshingly welcome."

== Book Description ==
"Pollution and environmental deterioration are often ascribed to the negative effects of science and technology, and remedies are seen only in that area. The Communist leader ascribes these new dangers of extinction basically to the unplanned, anarchic system of capitalism and to the profit motive of monopoly. He gives the discussion a class dimension, showing that workers suffer the most, both at the place of work and at home. While urging immediate remedies, he holds that socialism provides the solution, as show in the countries which have made the turn to the new social system."

== Content ==
=== Introduction ===
The author briefly introduces the problem of pollution and destruction in order to extract more natural resources. The author identifies the popular view as this problem is caused by science and technology, and declares that on the contrary, the problem lies in the social system that we live in - capitalism.

=== The Eggs and the Chickens Are Being Destroyed! ===
The author explores the effects that pollution has on the food supply of humans as well as important lifeforms on Earth. Forms of pollution such as lead, industrial mercury, as well as radiation from nuclear testing.

=== The Oldest Crime ===
The author brings to light the "oldest crime" of capitalism, which is the killing of workers by overworking as well as dangerous work conditions. Such issues that pertain to the lives of workers are neglected because of the profit incentive. In this chapter, the author also explores how the labor movements reacts to these kinds of issues regarding worker wellbeing.

=== "Kill Every living Thing" ===
In this chapter, the author discusses the war crimes committed by capitalist countries against those of Vietnam and other countries in Indochina, specifically regarding chemical warfare. The author then draws the connection between the destructive policies against these countries and the destructive policies against the environment.

=== The Roots of the Problem ===
The author once again reiterates the popular opinion on the issue of pollution, then discusses the effects that large corporations have on the environmental policies specifically in the United States.
