= Gus Hall =

American communist activist (1910–2000)

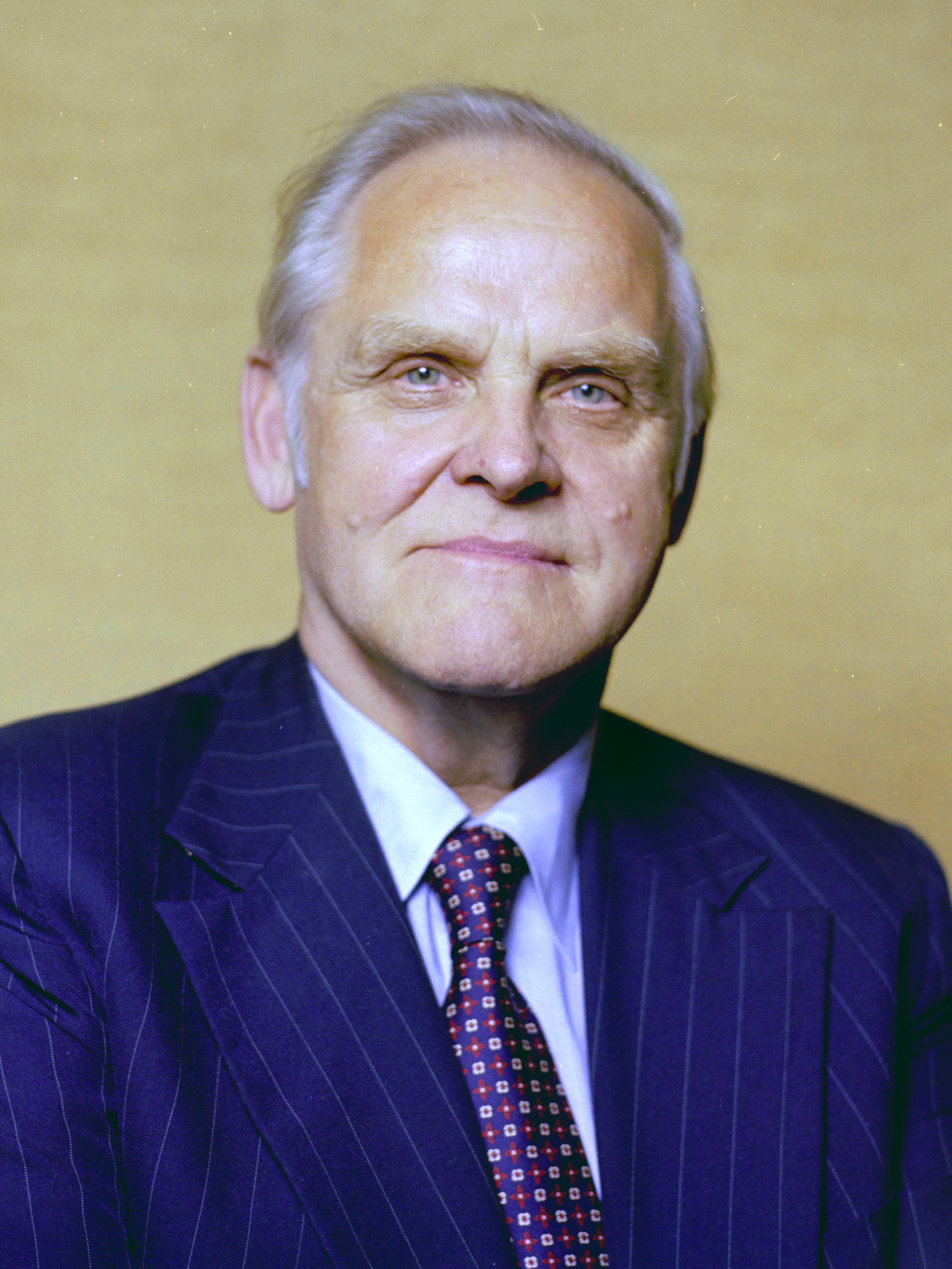
- Hall in 1980

General Secretary of the National Committee of the Communist Party USA
- In office December 14, 1959 – May 2000
- Chairperson: Eugene Dennis; Elizabeth Gurley Flynn; Henry Winston
- Preceded by: Eugene Dennis
- Succeeded by: Sam Webb

Personal details
- Born: Arvo Kustaa Halberg; October 8, 1910 Cherry Township, Minnesota, U.S.
- Died: October 13, 2000 (aged 90) New York City, U.S.
- Party: Communist Party USA
- Spouse: Elizabeth Mary Turner (m. 1935)
- Children: 2
- Education: International Lenin School
- Occupation: Lumberjack; miner; steel worker; trade unionist; political writer
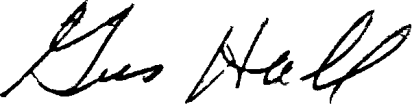
- Signature

Military service
- Allegiance: United States
- Branch/service: United States Navy
- Years of service: 1942–1946
- Rank: Machinist's Mate
- Battles/wars: World War II; Battle of Guam

Gus Hall (born Arvo Kustaa Halberg; October 8, 1910 – October 13, 2000) was an American communist activist who served as the general secretary of the Communist Party USA (CPUSA) from 1959 to 2000. As a labor leader, he was closely associated with the "Little Steel" strike of 1937, an effort to unionize the nation's smaller, regional steel manufacturers. Hall was indicted under the Smith Act during the Second Red Scare and was sentenced to 8 years in prison. After his release, Hall led the CPUSA for over 40 years, generally taking an orthodox Marxist-Leninist stance and becoming a perennial candidate for president of the United States.

Born to Finnish immigrants in Cherry Township, Minnesota, Hall's parents were active communists and had been involved with the CPUSA and the Industrial Workers of the World. Hall's family had ten children, and to support them, Hall left school and started working blue-collar jobs at age 15. He joined the CPUSA two years later, and by 1931, his apprenticeship in the Young Communist League allowed him to study abroad at the International Lenin School in the Soviet Union.

Hall moved to Minneapolis, Minnesota after returning from Moscow and became involved with various labor strikes there. He had been blacklisted after his participation in the Minneapolis Teamsters Strike of 1934, for which he spent six months in jail. It was then that he began calling himself Gus Hall, as he could no longer find work under his original name. He was a founding member of the Steel Workers Organizing Committee in the mid 1930s.

He was a leader of 1937's unsuccessful "Little Steel" strike, which led to his arrest for allegedly transporting bomb-making materials, to which he pled guilty and paid a $500 fine. Afterwards, he began climbing the ranks of the Communist Party, leading the party in Youngstown and then Cleveland, and he was the candidate for multiple Communist Party tickets in the state of Ohio, although he didn't garner many votes. In 1940, he spent 90 days in jail after an election scandal for which he was convicted of fraud and forgery. He served in the Navy from 1942 until 1946.

Indicted under the Smith Act in 1948, Hall was sentenced to 5 years in prison, and served over 5 more after getting caught trying to skip bail. He was elected general secretary of the CPUSA in 1959. The rise of the New Left in the 1960s hurt the Communist Party, and Hall tried but ultimately failed to form an alliance with New Left activists. He was consistently one of the staunchest supporters of the actions of the Soviet Union and became one of the best-known American politicians in the country. He made appearances on Soviet television in the 1960s and '70s, in which he always supported the Soviet government. He also frequently spoke on American talk shows to advocate for socialism in the United States.

Hall and his party endorsed Lyndon B. Johnson for president in 1964 in opposition to conservative Barry Goldwater. Beginning in 1972, rather than endorsing another party, Hall ran as the CPUSA's presidential candidate. He would do this four consecutive times until the party ceased presidential campaigns after 1984.

Hall resigned party leadership in 2000, leaving the post to Sam Webb. Hall lived with his wife in Yonkers, New York during his last years and died in Manhattan from complications relating to diabetes.

== Early life and political activism ==
Hall was born Arvo Kustaa Halberg in 1910 in Cherry Township, St. Louis County, Minnesota, a rural community on northern Minnesota's Mesabi Iron Range. He was Finnish-American, the son of Matt (Matti) and Susan (Susanna) Halberg. Hall's parents were Finnish immigrants from Lapua in South Ostrobothnia, and were politically radical: they were involved in the Industrial Workers of the World (IWW) and were early members of the Communist Party USA (CPUSA) in 1919. The Mesabi Range was one of the most important immigration settlements for Finns, who were often active in labor militancy and political activism. Hall's home language was Finnish, and he conversed with his nine siblings in that language for the rest of his life. He did not know political terminology in Finnish and used mostly English when meeting with visiting Finnish Communists.

Hall grew up in a Communist home and was involved early on in politics. According to Hall, after his father was banned from working in the mines for joining an IWW strike, the family grew up in near-starvation in a log cabin built by Halberg.

At 15, to support the impoverished ten-child family, Hall left school and went to work in the North Woods lumber camps, mines and railroads. Two years later in 1927, he was recruited to the CPUSA by his father. Hall became an organizer for the Young Communist League (YCL) in the upper Midwest. In 1931, an apprenticeship in the YCL qualified Hall to travel to the Soviet Union to study for two years at the International Lenin School in Moscow.

== Move to Minneapolis ==
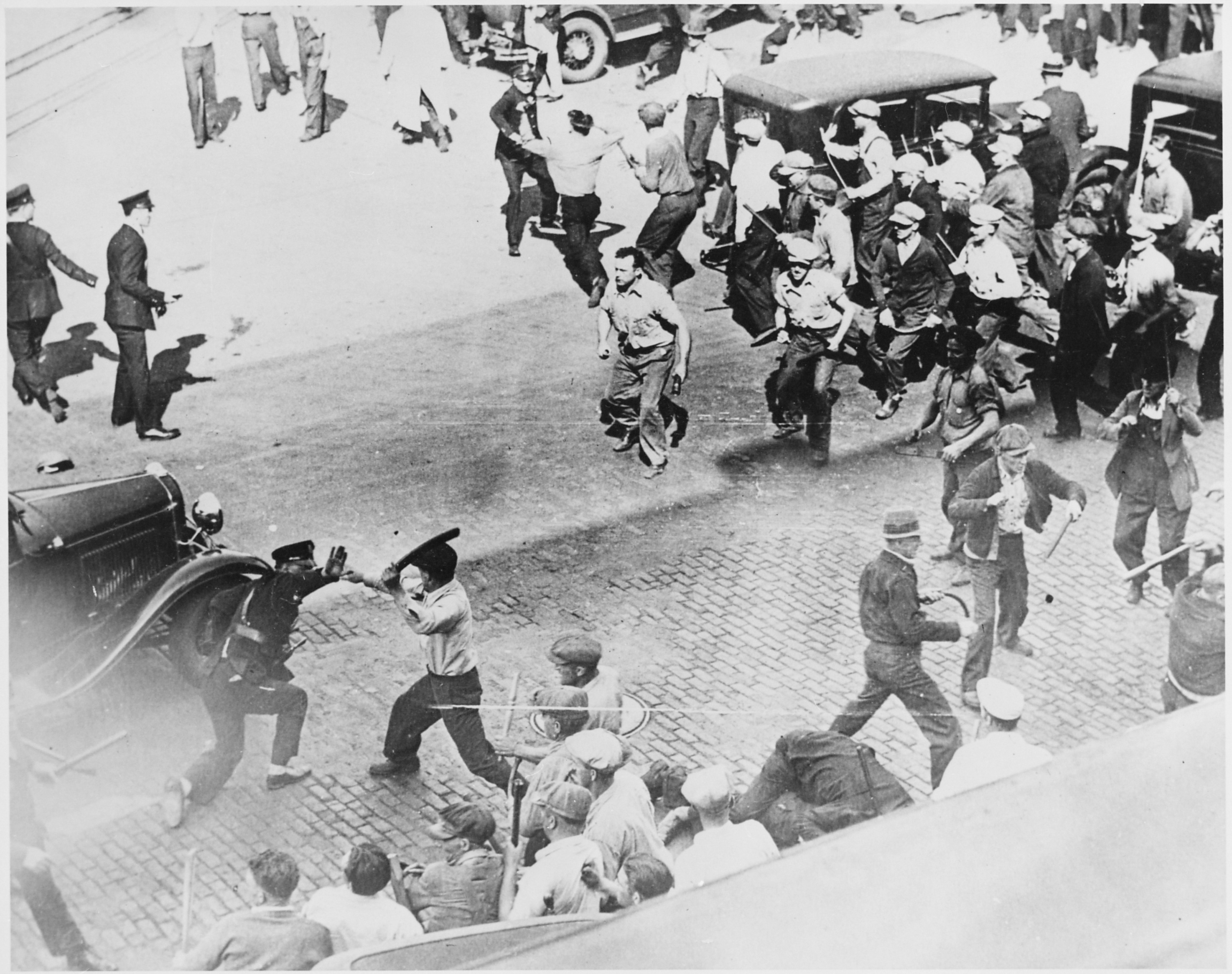
Open battle between striking teamsters armed with pipes and the police in the streets of Minneapolis, June 1934.

After his studies, Hall moved to Minneapolis to further the YCL activities there. He was involved in hunger marches, demonstrations on behalf of farmers, and various strikes during the Great Depression. In 1934, Hall was jailed for six months for taking part in the Minneapolis Teamster's Strike, led by Trotskyist Farrell Dobbs. After serving his sentence, Hall was blacklisted and was unable to find work under his original name. He changed his name to Gus Hall, derived from Kustaa (Gustav) Halberg. The change was confirmed in court in 1935.

== Ohio activism ==
In late 1934, Hall went to Ohio's Mahoning Valley. Following the call for organizing in the steel industry, Hall was among a handful hired at a steel mill in Youngstown, Ohio. During 1935–1936, he was involved in the Congress of Industrial Organizations (CIO) and was a founding organizer of the Steel Workers Organizing Committee (SWOC), which was set up by the CIO. Hall stated that he and others persuaded John L. Lewis, who was one of the founders of the CIO, that steel could be organized.

== "Little Steel" strike and war service ==
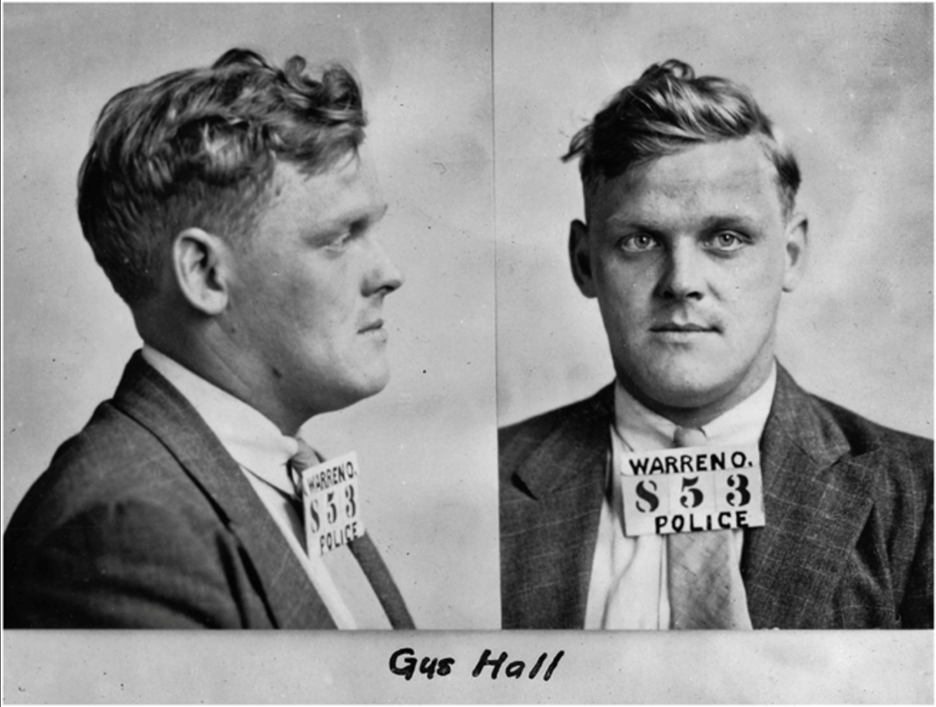
Hall's Warren Police mugshot, July 1, 1937.

Hall was a leader of the 1937 "Little Steel" strike, so called because it was directed against Republic Steel, Bethlehem Steel and the Youngstown Sheet and Tube Company, as opposed to the industry giant U.S. Steel. It had previously entered into a contract with SWOC without a strike. The strike was ultimately unsuccessful, and marred by the deaths of workers at Republic plants in Chicago and Youngstown. Hall was arrested for allegedly transporting bomb-making materials intended for Republic's plant in Warren, Ohio. He pleaded guilty to a misdemeanor and was fined $500. SWOC became the United Steelworkers of America (USWA) in 1942. Philip Murray, USWA founding president, once commented that Hall's leadership of the strike in Warren and Youngstown was a model of effective grassroots organizing.

After the 1937 strike, Hall focused on party activities instead of union work, and became the leader of the Communist Party USA (CPUSA) in Youngstown in 1937. His responsibilities in the party grew rapidly, and in 1939 he became the CPUSA leader for the city of Cleveland. Hall ran on the CPUSA ticket for Youngstown councilman and also for governor of Ohio, but received few votes. In 1940 Hall was convicted of fraud and forgery in an election scandal and spent 90 days in jail.

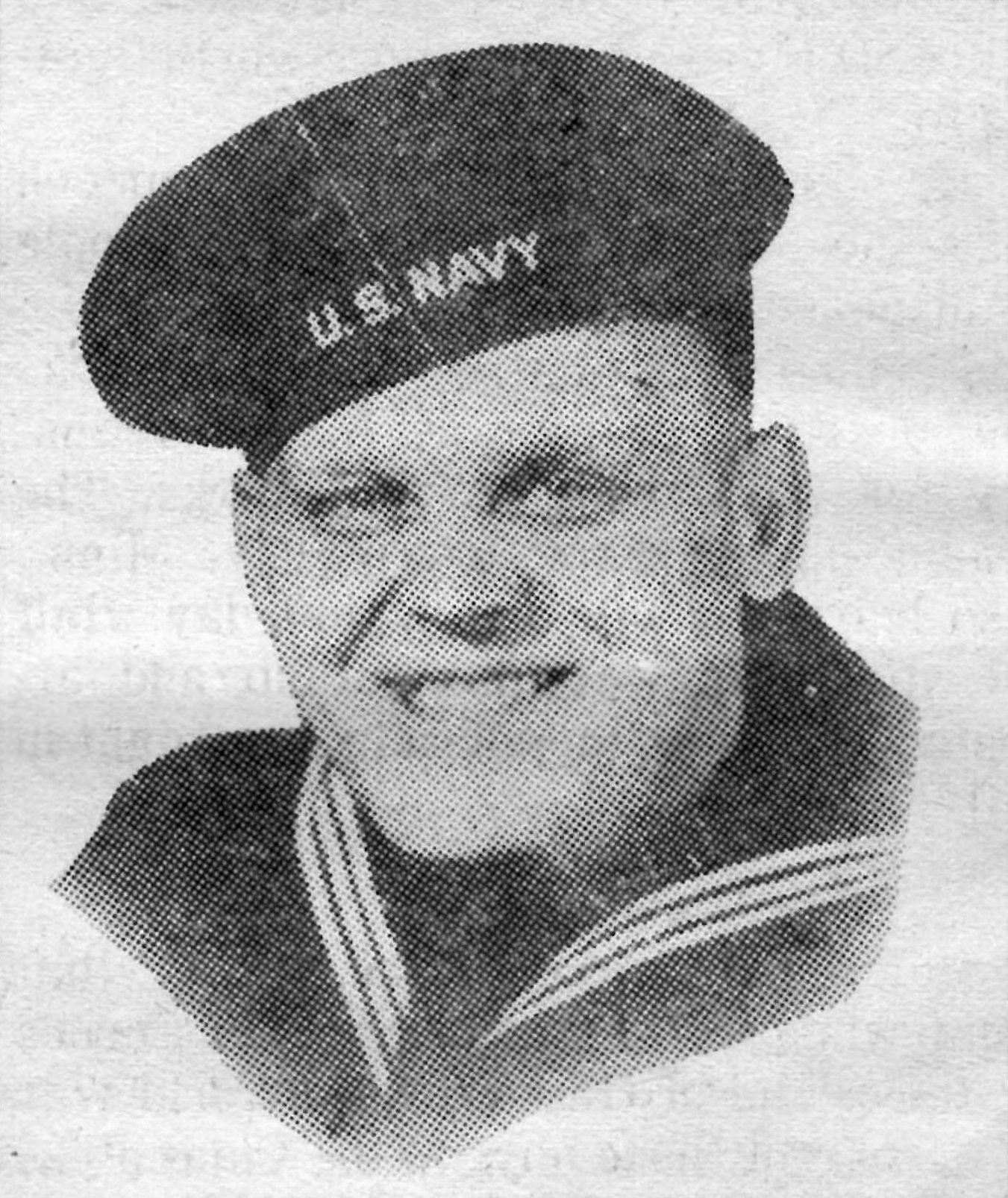
Hall in uniform c. 1942–1946

Hall volunteered for the United States Navy when World War II broke out, serving as a machinist's mate in Guam. During the first years of the war in Europe, the CPUSA held an isolationist stance, as the Soviet Union and Nazi Germany were cooperating based on the Molotov–Ribbentrop Pact. When Hitler broke the treaty by invading the USSR in June 1941, the CPUSA began to officially support the war effort. During his naval service, Hall was elected in absence to the National Committee of the CPUSA. He was honorably discharged from the Navy on March 6, 1946.

Seen as a Moscow loyalist, Hall's reputation in the party rose after the war. In 1946 he was elected to the national executive board of the party under the new general secretary, Eugene Dennis, a pro-Soviet Marxist–Leninist, who had replaced Earl Browder after the latter's expulsion from the party.

== Indictment during the Red Scare and rise to the head of the CPUSA ==
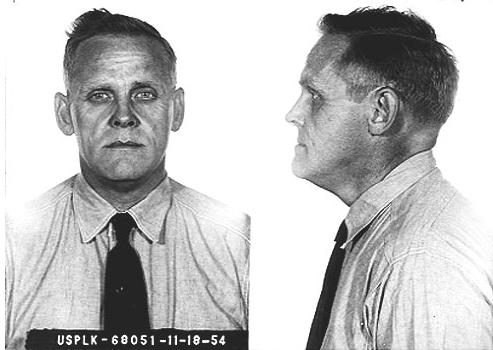
Hall's FBP mugshot, taken during his prison sentence in Leavenworth, Kansas for "Conspiring and Teaching Overthrow of the U.S. Government by Force or Violence", 1954.

Now a major American communist leader in the post-war era, Hall caught the attention of United States officials. On July 22, 1948, Hall and 11 other Communist Party leaders were indicted under the Alien Registration Act, popularly called the Smith Act, on charges of "conspiracy to teach and advocate the overthrow of the U.S. government by force and violence"; his conviction was based entirely on Hall's advocacy of Marxist-Leninist thought. Hall's initial prison sentence lasted for five years.

Released on bail, Hall rose to the secretariat of the CPUSA. When the Supreme Court upheld the Smith Act (June 4, 1951), Hall and three other men skipped bail and went underground. Hall's attempt to flee to Moscow failed when he was picked up in Mexico City on October 8, 1951. He was sentenced to three more years and eventually served over five and a half years in Leavenworth Federal Penitentiary. In prison he distributed party leaflets and lifted weights. He was located in a cell adjacent to that of George "Machine Gun" Kelly, a notorious gangster of the prohibition era. The Supreme Court of the United States later reversed some convictions under the Smith Act as unconstitutional.

In the early 1960s, Hall was in danger of facing yet another indictment, this time under the Internal Security Act of 1950, known as the McCarran Act, but the Supreme Court found the Act partly unconstitutional, and the government abandoned its charges. The act required "Communist action" organizations to register with the government, it excluded party members from applying for United States passports or holding government jobs. Because of the Act, Hall's driver's license was revoked by the State of New York.

After his release, Hall continued his activities. He began to travel around the United States, ostensibly on vacation but gathering support to replace Dennis as the general secretary. He accused Dennis of cowardice for not going underground as ordered in 1951 and also claimed Dennis had used funds reserved for the underground for his own purposes. Hall's rise to the position of general secretary was generally unexpected by the American Communist circles (the post was expected to go to either Henry Winston or Gil Green, both important figures in the YCL), although Hall had held the office of acting general secretary briefly in the early 1950s after Dennis's arrest. In 1959, Hall was elected CPUSA general secretary and afterward received the Order of Lenin.

== General Secretary of the CPUSA ==
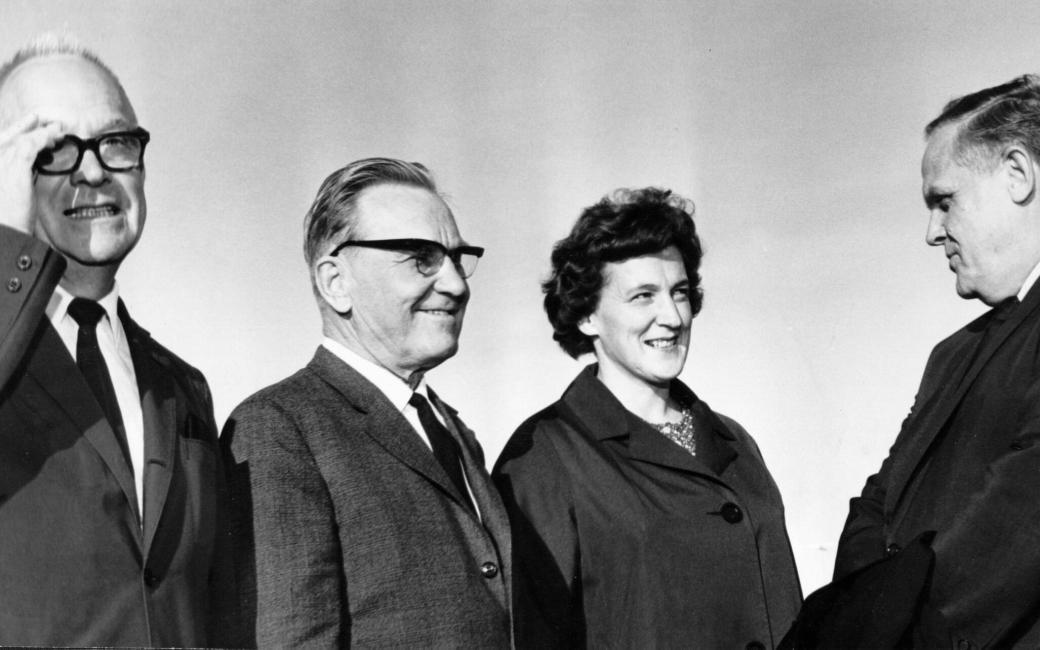
Hall (far right) visits Finnish Communists, 1966.

The McCarthy era had taken a heavy toll on the Communist Party USA, as many American members were called to testify to congressional committees. In addition, due to the Soviet invasion of Hungary in 1956, many members became disenchanted and left the party. They were also moved by the Soviet leader Nikita Khrushchev's dismissal of Stalinism. In the United States, the rise of the New Left and the Warsaw Pact invasion of Czechoslovakia in 1968 created hostility between leftists and the CPUSA, marginalizing it.

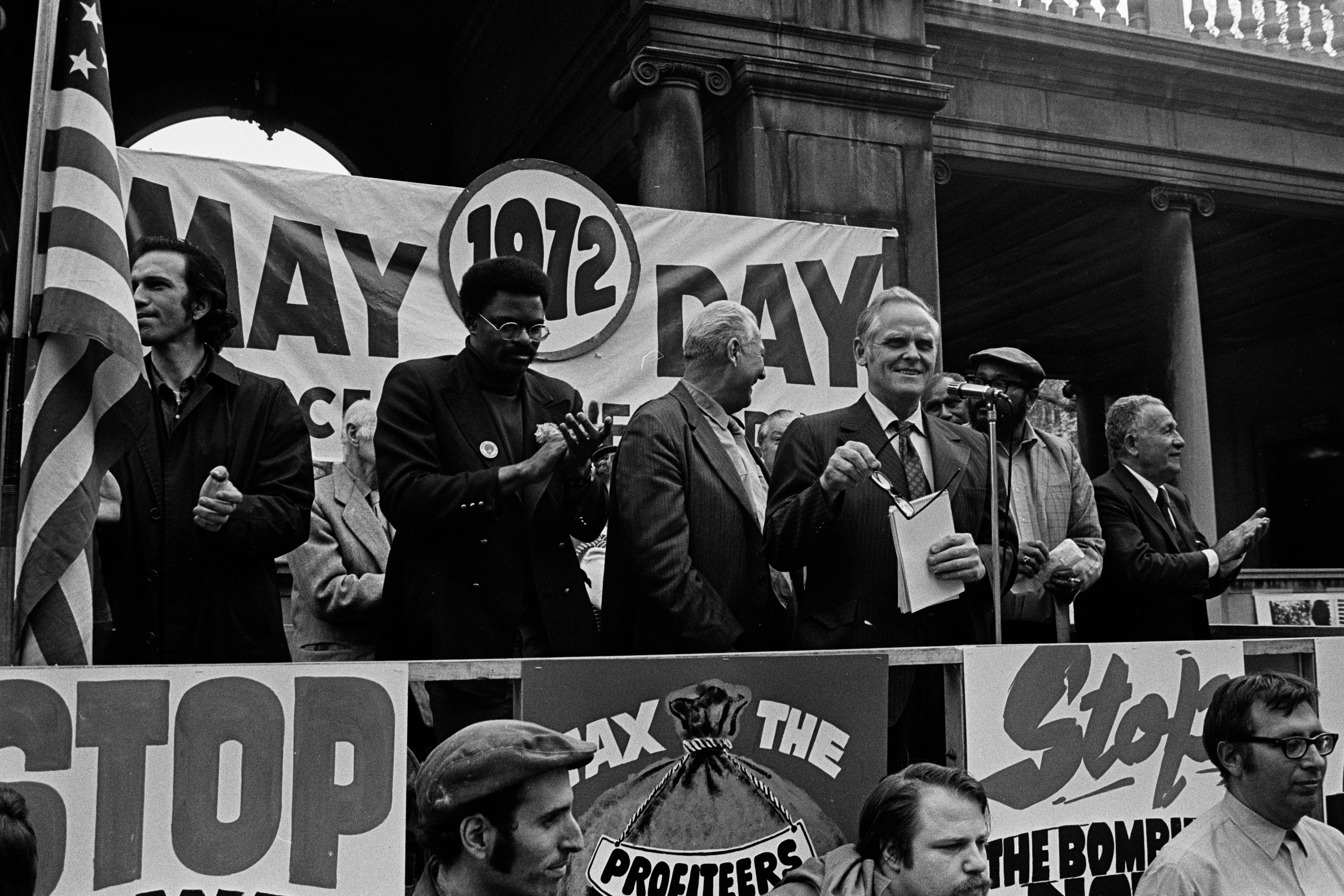
Hall speaks at a May Day demonstration in Manhattan's Union Square, May 1, 1972

Hall, along with other party leaders who remained, sought to rebuild the party. He led the struggle to reclaim the legality of the Communist Party and addressed tens of thousands in Oregon, Washington, and California. Envisioning a democratization of the American Communist movement, Hall spoke of a "broad people's political movement" and tried to ally his party with radical campus groups, the anti-Vietnam War movement, organizations active in the civil rights movement, and the new rank-and-file trade union movements in an effort to build the CPUSA among the young "baby boomer" generation of activists. Ultimately, Hall failed to forge a lasting alliance with the New Left.

Hall had a reputation of being one of the most convinced supporters of the actions and interests of the Soviet Union outside the USSR's political sphere of influence. From 1959 onward, Hall spent some time in Moscow each year and was one of the most widely known American politicians in the USSR, where he was received by high-level Soviet politicians such as Leonid Brezhnev.

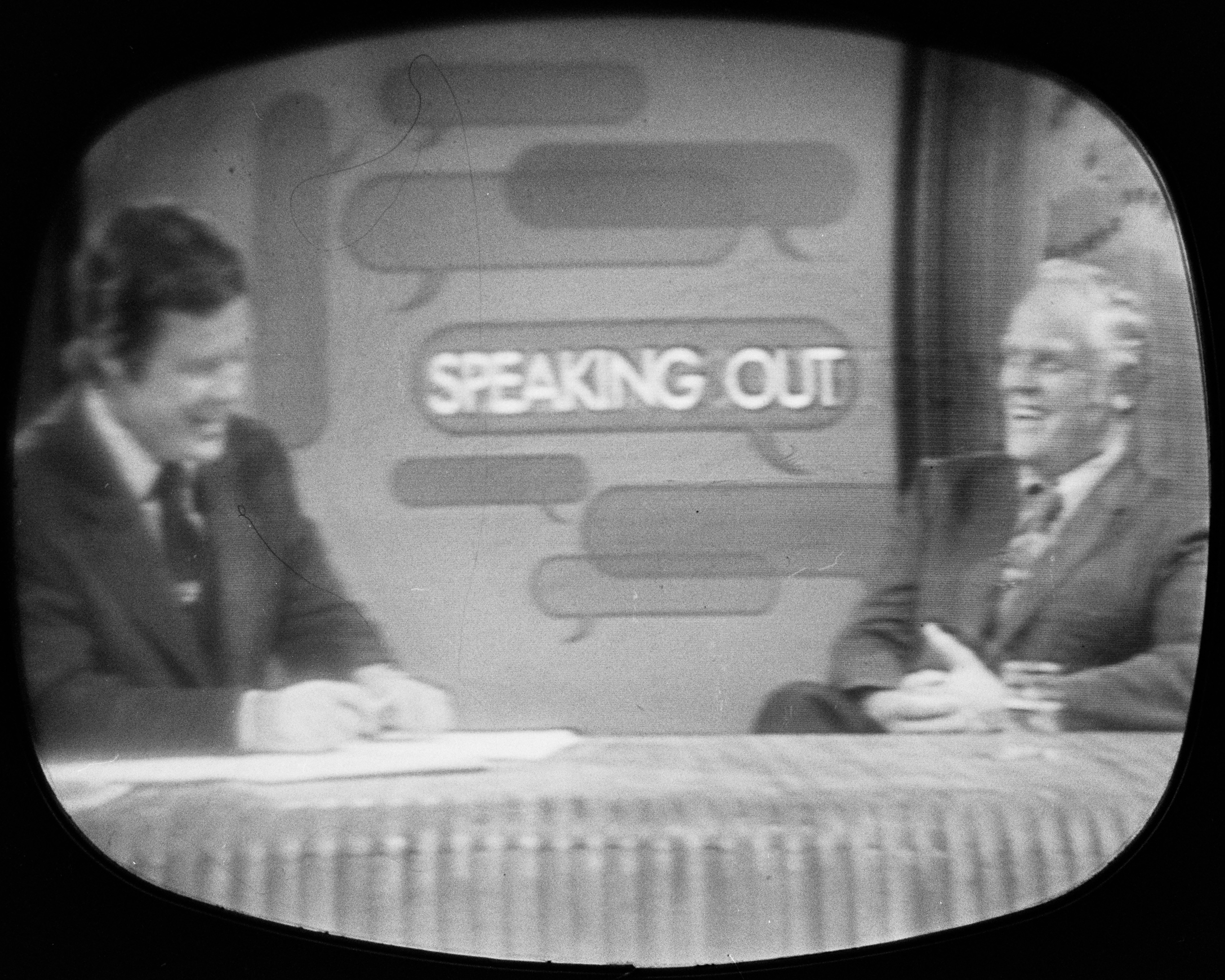
Hall (right) on the CBS talk show Speaking Out, October 6, 1972

Hall spoke regularly on campuses and talk shows as an advocate for socialism in the United States. He argued for socialism in the United States to be built on the traditions of U.S.-style democracy rooted in the United States Bill of Rights. He would often say Americans didn't accept the Constitution without a Bill of Rights and wouldn't accept socialism without a Bill of Rights. He professed deep confidence in the democratic traditions of the American people. He remained a prolific writer on current events, producing a great number of articles and pamphlets, of which many were published in the magazine Political Affairs.

As the general secretary, Hall spoke for "communist democracy" and did not advocate for the overthrow of the government, arguing that "socialism in America will come through the ballot box". In the 1964 United States presidential election, Hall endorsed Lyndon B. Johnson, stating that a Barry Goldwater presidency might result in a nuclear war with the Soviet Union. He tried to attract the anti-war movement to the CPUSA through postulating abolition of nuclear weapons and peace between the USSR and USA; Hall also hoped to appeal to the civil rights movement, blaming capitalism for slavery and oppression of African-Americans.

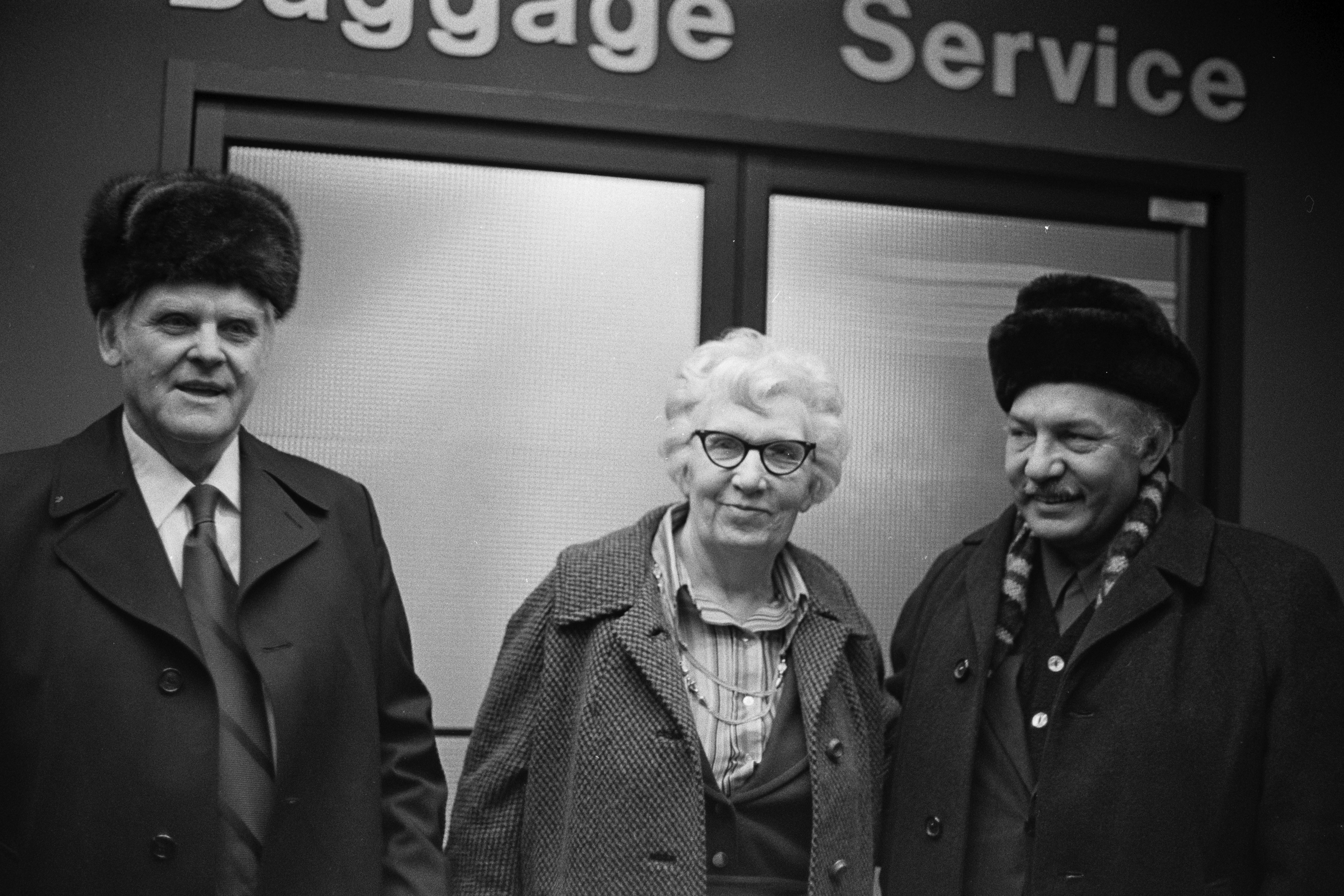
Hall (left), Helen Winter (center) and James E. Jackson return from the 25th Congress of the Communist Party of the Soviet Union, March 7, 1976

During the 1960s and 1970s, Hall also made frequent appearances on Soviet television, always supporting the position of the Soviet regime. Hall guided the CPUSA in accordance with the party line of the Communist Party of the Soviet Union (CPSU), rejecting any liberalization efforts such as Eurocommunism. He also dismissed the radical new revolutionary movements that criticized the official Soviet party line of "Peaceful coexistence" and called for a world revolution. After the Sino-Soviet split, Maoism likewise was condemned, and all Maoist sympathizers were expelled from the CPUSA in the early 1960s. Hall also supported the socialist governments of Cuba and Vietnam, but severely criticized China and North Korea, including accusing them of lack of political freedom.

Hall defended the Soviet invasions of Czechoslovakia and Afghanistan, and supported the Stalinist principle of "Socialism in One Country". In the early 1980s, Hall and the CPUSA criticized the Solidarity movement in Poland. In 1992, the Moscow daily Izvestia claimed that the CPUSA had received over $40 million in payments from the Soviet Union, contradicting Hall's long-standing claims of financial independence. The former KGB General Oleg Kalugin declared in his memoir that the KGB had Hall and the American Communist Party "under total control" and that he was known to be siphoning off "Moscow money" to set up his own horse-breeding farm. The writer and J. Edgar Hoover biographer Curt Gentry has noted that a similar story about Hall was planted in the media through the FBI's secret COINTELPRO campaign of disruption and disinformation against radical opposition groups.

== Presidential candidate and later years ==
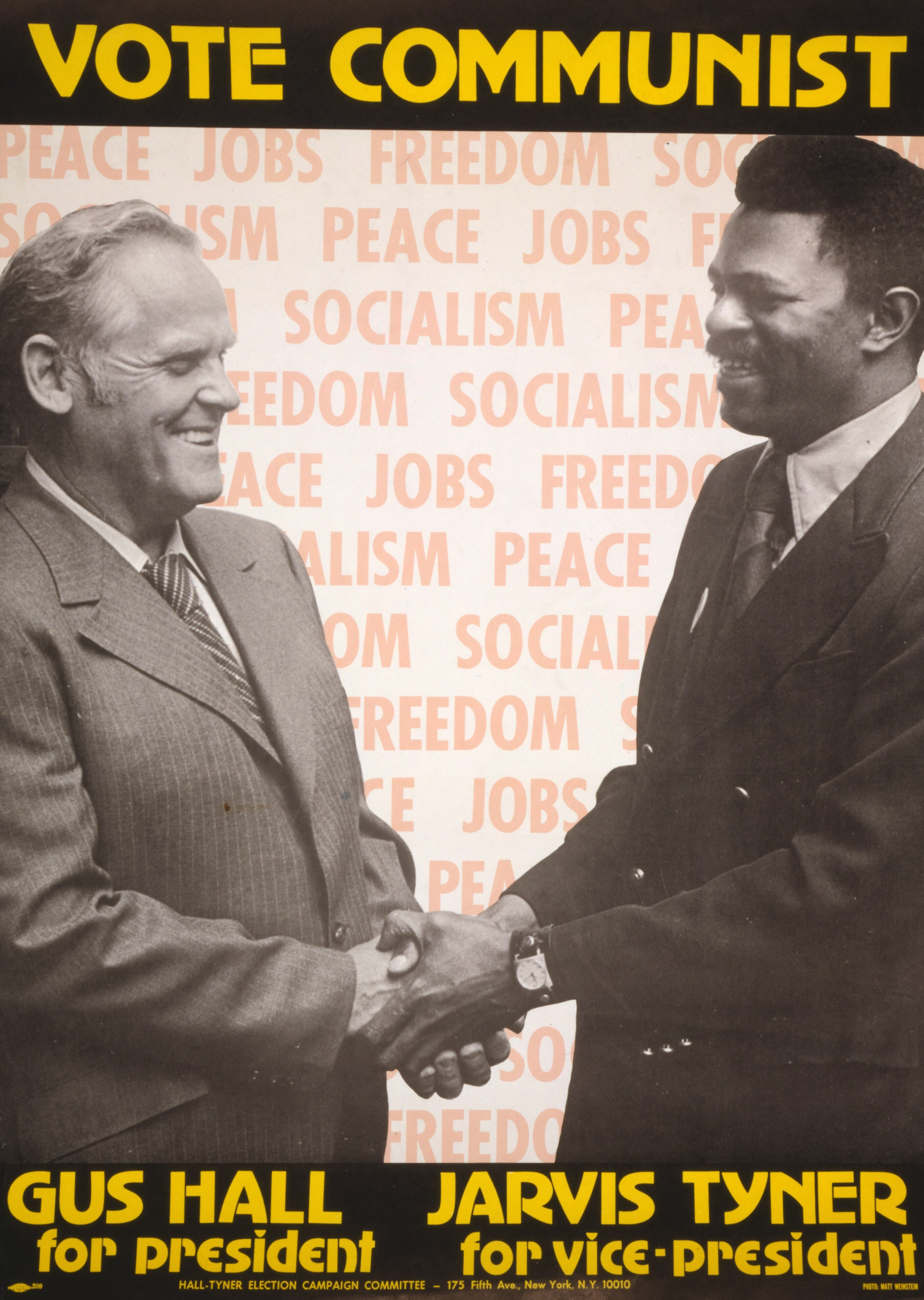
1976 campaign poster featuring Hall and running mate Jarvis Tyner.

In the 1964 United States presidential election, Hall's party supported Lyndon B. Johnson, saying it was necessary to prevent the victory of the conservative Barry Goldwater. During the 1972 presidential election, the CPUSA withdrew its support from the Democratic Party and nominated Hall as its candidate. Hall ran for president four times—in 1972, 1976, 1980, and 1984—the last two times with Angela Davis. Of the four elections, Hall received the largest number of votes in 1976, largely because of the Watergate scandal bringing protest votes for minor parties. Hall ranked only in eighth place among the presidential candidates. Owing to the great expense of running, the difficulty in meeting the strenuous and different election law provisions in each state, and the difficulty in getting media coverage, the CPUSA decided to suspend running national campaigns while continuing to run candidates at the local level. While ceasing presidential campaigns, the CPUSA did not renew support for the Democratic Party.

Hall's results in his presidential candidacies
Election year	Running mate	Received votes (absolute)	Received votes (%)
1972	Jarvis Tyner	25,597	0.03%
1976	Jarvis Tyner	58,709	0.07%
1980	Angela Davis	44,933	0.05%
1984	Angela Davis	36,386	0.04%

The 1980s were a politically difficult decade for Hall and the CPUSA, as one of Hall's trusted confidants and the deputy head of the CPUSA, Morris Childs, was revealed in 1980 to be a longtime Federal Bureau of Investigation informant. Although Childs was taken into the United States Federal Witness Protection Program and received the Presidential Medal of Freedom in 1987, Hall continued to deny that Childs had been a spy. Also, Henry Winston, Hall's African-American deputy, died in 1986. The black party base questioned the fact that the leadership was exclusively white.

After the dissolution of the Soviet Union in 1991, the party faced another crisis. In a press conference that year, Hall warned of witch hunts and McCarthyism in Russia, comparing that country unfavorably with North Korea. Hall led a faction of the party that stood against glasnost and perestroika and, for the hardliners of the CPSU, accused Mikhail Gorbachev and Boris Yeltsin of "demolishing" socialism. Hall supported Vietnam and Cuba but criticized the People's Republic of China for failing to oppose the West. In late 1991, members wanting reform founded the Committees of Correspondence for Democracy and Socialism, a group critical of the direction in which Hall was taking the party. When they were unable to influence the leadership, they left the party and Hall purged them from the membership, including such leaders as Angela Davis and Charlene Mitchell.

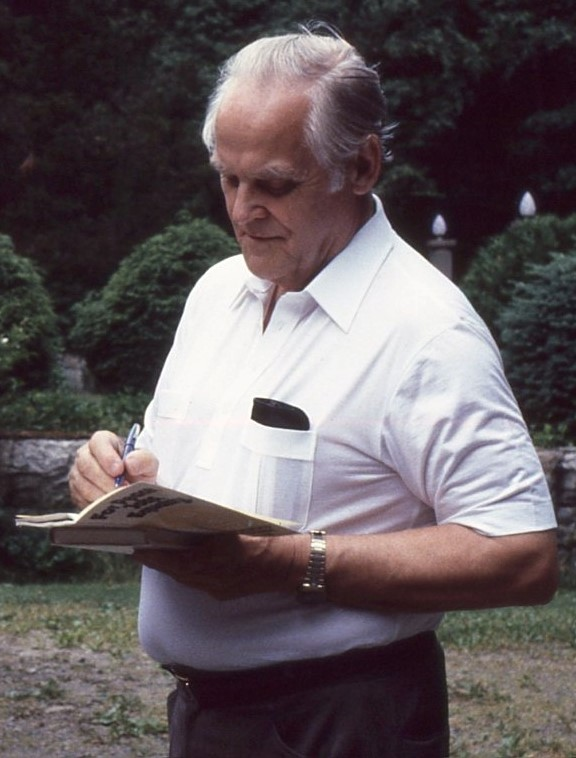
Hall signs a copy of For Peace, Jobs, Equality, 1984.

During the last years of his life, Hall lived in Yonkers, New York, with his wife, Elizabeth. Along with following political events, Hall engaged in hobbies that included art collecting, organic gardening, and painting. In 2000, shortly before his death, Hall resigned the post of party chairman in favor of Sam Webb and was appointed honorary chairman. In 1994, Michael Myerson, who had left the CPUSA along with Herbert Aptheker, Angela Davis, Gil Green, and Charlene Mitchell, accused Hall of living a "good bourgeois life" including "an estate in fashionable Hampton Bays".

== Criticism ==
When the Trotskyist Socialist Workers Party (SWP) and its leaders in the Midwest Teamsters were prosecuted under the Smith Act in Minnesota in 1941, some Communist Party members supported the government actions. Later, Hall admitted it was a mistake for the party to not openly fight against imprisonment of SWP members under the Smith Act. The Trotskyist movement held strong negative opinions against Hall; upon his death, the Trotskyist World Socialist Web Site denounced him for what they perceived as his incompetence, loyalty to the Soviet Union, and abandonment of the working class.

At times, some Soviet officials criticized Hall by accusing him of poor leadership of the CPUSA. Young American communists were advised to distance themselves from CPUSA, as the party was under intense FBI surveillance, and these officials believed that under such conditions the party could not be successful.

Many conservatives saw Hall as a threat to the United States, with J. Edgar Hoover describing him as "a powerful, deceitful, dangerous foe of Americanism." An inflammatory anti-Christian statement was falsely ascribed to Hall, earning him the hostility of some Christian groups, including Jerry Falwell's Moral Majority. In a 1977 speech, future U.S. president Ronald Reagan planned to quote this alleged 1961 statement as proof of the evils of communism: "I dream of the hour when the last congressman is strangled to death on the guts of the last preacher — and since the Christians seem to love to sing about the blood, why not give them a little of it? Slit the throats of their children [and] draw them over the mourner's bench and the pulpit and allow them to drown in their own blood, and then see whether they enjoy singing those hymns." The statement, which Reagan ultimately excised from his speech because he claimed he did not have the "nerve" to say it, was falsely claimed to have been said by Hall at the funeral oration of former CPUSA party chairman William Z. Foster. Hall would later make positive comments about Christianity; in 1963, he called the papal encyclical Pacem in terris "the work of a great Pope". According to Francis Nigel Lee, Hall held Pope John XXIII in high regard and hoped for dialogue between Catholics and Communists, writing in Political Affairs that "Marxists have shown their remarkable willingness to go along with Pope John's giant step forward." Gus Hall is also reported to have said: “Our quarrel is with capitalism, not God.”

Hall was also accused of homophobia, as the CPUSA followed a Stalinist doctrine of declaring homosexuality a "fascist tendency". As a result, openly gay party members such as Harry Hay were expelled from the party in the 1950s. The Communist Party was critical of newly emerging social movements in the 1960s and 1970s, keeping its distance from the New Left. Nevertheless, some CPUSA members attempted to appeal to the youth, with Gil Green arguing that “the correct line should have been to try to turn this upheaval amongst young people into a permanent kind of movement while letting its dynamics work itself out with our participation.” Despite the fact that the Communist party of Mexico and some Afro-American communists such as Jarvis Tyner and Kendra Alexander opposed homophobia, CPUSA was opposed to gay rights, with the official party programme from early 1970s condemning any behaviour “which encourages or promotes homosexual relationships as an alternative to sound, healthy, male–female relationships or distracts from the family as the basic unity of society and the fundamental component of the future we see to bring into being” and repudiating “as false any attempt to depict the so-called gay lifestyle as part of advanced and even revolutionary movements, or to promote it in the guise of a progressive ideology". However, Hall himself was not homophobic. According to Erwin Marquit, Hall sought to moderate the party's hostile stance towards gay groups, and when questioned by the student council of the University of Minnesota, he stated his opposition to expelling homosexual members from the party. Hall had also intervened on behalf of Bernard Koten, a party member who was arrested in Kiev in August 1963 and charged with homosexuality. Hall reacted strongly to the news of Koten's arrest and called for the charges to be dropped "unless a more serious crime is involved". After protests from Hall and a number of progressive activists, Koten was released without trial.

== Personal life and death ==
In Youngstown, Hall met Elizabeth Mary Turner (1909–2003), a woman of Hungarian background. They were married in 1935. Elizabeth was a leader in her own right, among the first women steelworkers and a secretary of SWOC. They had two children, Barbara (Conway) (1938–2022) and Arvo (born 1947).

Gus Hall died on October 13, 2000, at Lenox Hill Hospital in Manhattan from diabetes mellitus complications. He was buried in the Forest Home Cemetery near Chicago.

== Works ==
- Peace can be won!, report to the 15th Convention, Communist Party, U.S.A., New York: New Century Publishers, 1951.
- Our sights to the future: keynote report and concluding remarks at the 17th National Convention of the Communist Party, U.S.A., New York: New Century Publishers, 1960.
- Main Street to Wall Street: End the Cold War!, New York: New Century Publishers, 1962.
- Which way U.S.A. 1964? The communist view., New York: New Century Publishers, 1964.
- On course: the revolutionary process; report to the 19th National Convention of the Communist Party, U.S.A. by its general secretary, New York: New Outlook Publishers and Distributors, 1969.
- Ecology: Can We Survive Under Capitalism?, International Publishers, New York 1972.
- Imperialism today; an evaluation of major issues and events of our time, New York, International Publishers, 1972 ISBN 0-7178-0303-1
- The energy rip-off: cause & cure, International Publishers, New York 1974, ISBN 0-7178-0421-6.
- The crisis of U.S. capitalism and the fight-back: report to the 21st convention of the Communist Party, U.S.A., New York: International Publishers, 1975.
- Labor up-front in the people's fight against the crisis: report to the 22nd convention of the Communist Party, USA, New York: International Publishers, 1979.
- Basics: For Peace, Democracy, and Social Progress, International Publishers, New York. 1980.
- For peace, jobs, equality: prevent "The Day after", defeat Reaganism: report to the 23rd Convention of the Communist Party, U.S.A., New York: New Outlook Publishers and Distributors, 1983. ISBN 0-87898-156-X
- Karl Marx: beacon for our times, International Publishers, New York 1983, ISBN 0-7178-0607-3.
- Fighting racism: selected writings, International Publishers, New York 1985, ISBN 0-7178-0634-0.
- Working class USA: the power and the movement, International Publishers, New York 1987, ISBN 0-7178-0660-X.

== Notes and references ==
Party political offices
Preceded by Eugene Dennis	General Secretary of the CPUSA; 1959–2000	Succeeded by Sam Webb
