= William F. Dunne =

American politician (1887–1953)

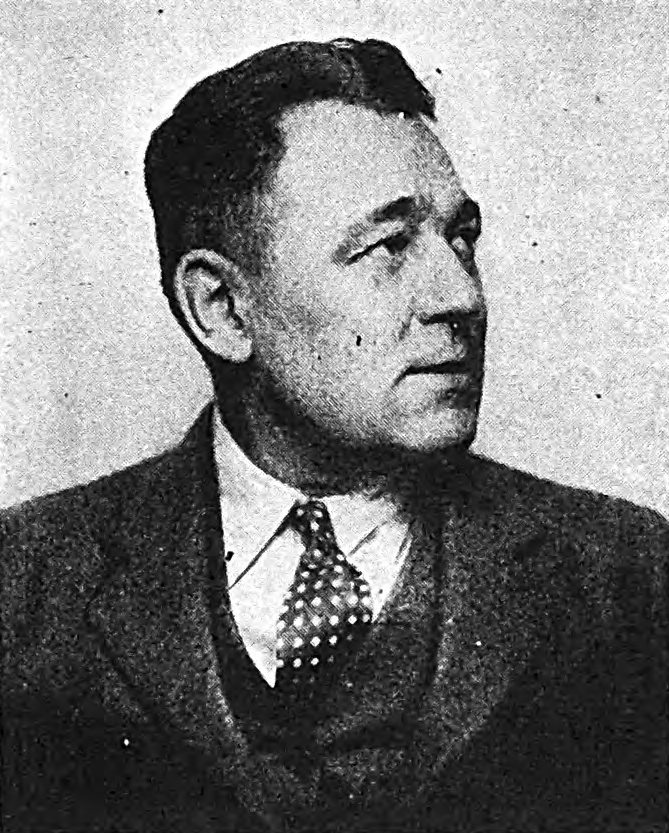
- Dunne c. 1928

Member of the Montana House of Representatives from the Silver Bow County district
- In office January 6, 1919 – January 3, 1921

Personal details
- Born: October 15, 1887 Kansas City, Missouri, U.S.
- Died: September 23, 1953 (aged 65)
- Party: Socialist (1910–1919); Communist Labor (1919–1921); Communist (1921–1946)
- Other political affiliations: Democratic (1918–1920); Nonpartisan League (1918–1920); Workers (1921–1929)
- Spouse: Marguerite Walsh
- Children: 1
- Relatives: Vincent R. Dunne (brother)
- Occupation: Editor; Union Organizer

William Francis Dunne (October 15, 1887 – September 23, 1953) was an American Marxist political activist, newspaper editor and trade unionist. He is best remembered as the editor of the radical Butte Bulletin around the turn of the 1920s, and as an editor of the Daily Worker, the daily newspaper of the Communist Party USA, from the middle-1920s through the 1930s. Dunne was a founding member of the Communist Labor Party of America which merged with the CPUSA, but was removed from the national leadership of the latter party in 1934 and expelled in 1946 on charges of factionalism.

== Early life ==
William F. Dunne, known to his friends as "Bill," was born October 15, 1887, in Kansas City, Missouri, the son of William Dunne, an Irish immigrant, and Adella (née Raymond) Dunne, a French-Canadian. Soon after his birth, his family moved to Minnesota, where his father was a railroad worker.

After graduating high school, Dunne attended the College of St. Thomas in St. Paul, a private, Roman Catholic institution. The Panic of 1907 forced Dunne to drop out and help support his family. Dunne went to work on the Northern Pacific Railroad as an electrician and joined the International Brotherhood of Electrical Workers (IBEW). Dunne later joined the United Brotherhood of Carpenters and Joiners of America. He wandered from job to job, traveling around the Pacific Northwest and working for railroads and once for a telephone company in Montana. Dunne joined the Socialist Party of America in 1910. Eventually, he made a home in Vancouver, British Columbia, Canada. He briefly tried to earn a living as a prizefighter in the Spokane, Washington area in 1912. He gave up boxing to become business agent for the Vancouver IBEW local.

In 1914, Dunne married Marguerite Walsh. The couple had one son, killed by an automobile in 1925.

== Career ==
=== Union organizer ===
Dunne was promoted in the IBEW to vice president in charge of organizing for the Pacific District, which included Washington, Oregon, Idaho, and British Columbia. He served on a committee to draft British Columbia's first Workers' compensation law. When World War I broke out in Europe, Dunne saw it as an imperialist conspiracy to take over the world's economy. He vocally opposed Canadian involvement in the war. He also joined the left-wing McNamara-Mooney Defense Committee as its northwestern representative. These activities led to his expulsion from Canada as an undesirable alien in 1916.

After leaving Canada, Dunne settled in Butte, Montana. He became the chief electrician for the Anaconda Company's Neversweat Mine. Dunne was elected vice-president of the Montana Federation of Labor during World War I. On June 8, 1917, a fire at the Speculator Mine resulted in the deaths of 168 miners and inspired the formation of the Mine Metal Workers Union. Three thousand miners immediately went on strike for safer conditions. Dunne led the Butte IBEW local to join the strike and shut down copper production as fifteen thousand workers walked off the job. In retaliation, mine owners hired Pinkerton agents to aid strike breakers, and Montana governor Sam V. Stewart declared martial law. The federal government needed Butte copper for the World War I effort, and the striking miners were seen not just as unpatriotic for failing to support the war effort, but as anti-American. National Guard troops arrived in Butte, as did federal mediators. When the more moderate factions of miners reached an agreement with the mining companies and returned to work, radical groups, including the socialist Industrial Workers of the World, took control of the strike. Dunne served as head of the IBEW strike committee and, with funding from the IWW and other unions, published the Butte Strike Bulletin as a daily newsletter for the strikers. In August 1917, Dunne delivered the eulogy at the funeral service for IWW leader Frank Little, who was murdered in Butte.

=== Butte Bulletin ===
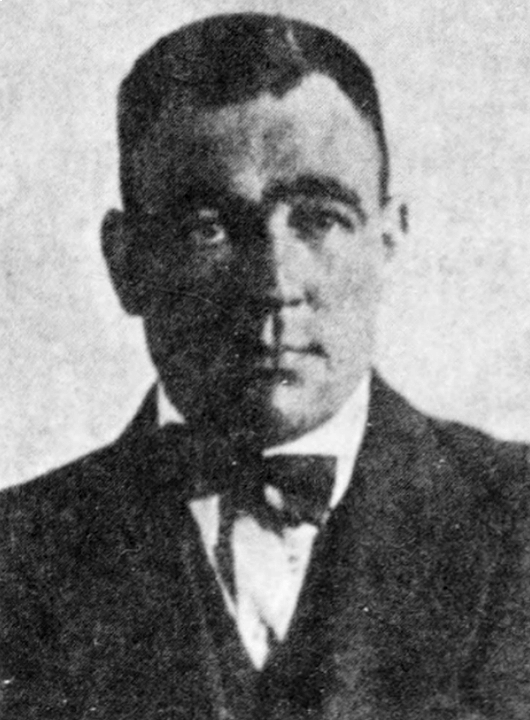
Dunne c. 1917

After the strike faded in September 1917, Dunne transformed the strike bulletin into a socialist weekly newspaper called the Butte Bulletin. Dunne set a radical left-wing editorial policy for the Bulletin. He published admiring editorials and political cartoons about the Bolshevik Revolution and reprinted reports from Russia by John Reed. The newsroom featured portraits of Karl Marx and Vladimir Lenin. Dunne's editorials regularly attacked the "insane system of capitalist production," infuriating conservatives.

In February 1918, the Montana legislature passed a series of bills designed to bolster the war effort and squelch opposition. Among these was a sedition act that made it a crime to speak, write, or publish anything "disloyal, profane, violent, scurrilous, contemptuous, slurring or abusive" about the U.S. government, soldiers, or symbols. The Montana Council of Defense, which had been established to coordinate county war efforts, took it upon itself to enforce the sedition act. Dunne was summoned for rounds of questioning by the Council from May 31 to June 2. On the heels of a national order that banned the establishment of any new newspapers, the council issued its own order banning any existing weeklies or monthlies from upgrading to dailies. Ostensibly, these measures were meant to conserve paper, but the council used them to try to silence Dunne. Dunne promptly defied the council and upgraded the Bulletin to a daily. For this infraction, Dunne faced another round of questioning by the council, after which Dunne wrote an editorial pointing out that the council had no legal standing. On September 13, 1918, soldiers raided the offices of the Butte Daily Bulletin searching for posters that Dunne had allegedly printed in support of a national strike. They found none, but they arrested Dunne anyway on the charge of carrying a concealed weapon without a permit. He was released on bail, only to be arrested again two days later and charged with sedition.

=== Political career ===
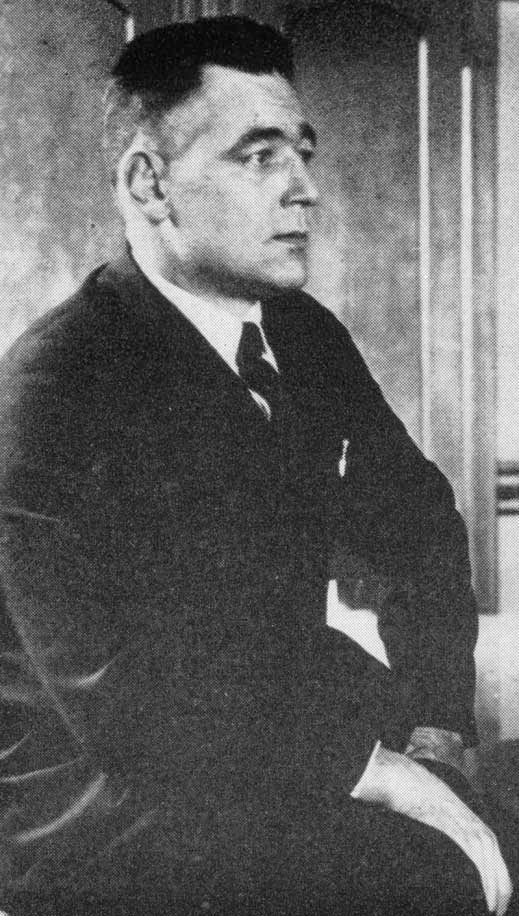
Dunne c. 1922

Dunne's opposition to the council made him popular in Butte, and Silver Bow County elected him to the Montana House of Representatives in November 1918. He ran on the Democratic ticket as a Nonpartisan League candidate. During his term, he introduced a worker's compensation bill, but a committee watered it down to the point that Dunne himself voted against it. He also sponsored a resolution demanding that U.S. troops be withdrawn from Russia, where they supported the anti-Communist side in the Russian Civil War. Dunne's trial for sedition took place during his legislative term, causing his absence from nearly half of the legislature's working sessions. Burton K. Wheeler served as Dunne's defense attorney. Following a three-day trial, during which Dunne was blasted as a "Bolshevist and an agitator," Dunn was convicted and fined $5,000. Upon this verdict, the legislature considered expelling Dunne but waited for him to appeal his case. Dunne won his appeal; the Montana Supreme Court acquitted him in May 1920 on the grounds of judicial error. The judge in the case had not allowed the defense to ask prospective jurors whether they could vote for acquittal if they should entertain a reasonable doubt that Dunne's editorial was "calculated to incite or inflame resistance" to the Montana state council of defense.

In February 1920, Dunne entered the race for mayor of Butte. Dunne's sedition trial had earned him popular local support, and he won the primary. The mayor and city council cited "irregularities," which they did not specify, and recounted the votes. They claimed to discover an error and declared Dunne's opponent the winner by a margin of 108 votes. Dunne announced that he would run as an independent in the election, and at the same time he demanded a recount. These actions cancelled each other out destroyed his chance of victory. Dunne ran for another term in the state legislature in the fall of 1920, but he lost his bid.

=== Communist Party ===
The injustice and fraud that Dunne experienced pushed him to the radical left. He gave up hope that change could be effected within the system. In the fall of 1919, with the split of the Socialist Party into socialist and communist factions, Ella Reeve Bloor recruited Dunne to join the Communist Labor Party of America. Dunne joined nine other members of the Silver Bow County Socialist Party to found the Montana branch of the Communist Party, bringing his Butte local with him into the new organization. Dunne moved away from Montana after losing the 1920 legislative election.

Despite his long tenure, Dunne was always regarded as a bit of a loose cannon in the Communist movement, as historian Theodore Draper recounts:

"Unlike most of the other former Socialists, Dunne was never completely housebroken in the Communist movement. It seems that he tried to get to Moscow in 1921 by working his way across on a boat bound for Stettin, Germany [now part of Poland]. There he went on a spree with some shipmates, invited the attention of the German police, and never reached his destination. He returned to New York to add one more radical trade-unionist to the new Communist leadership."

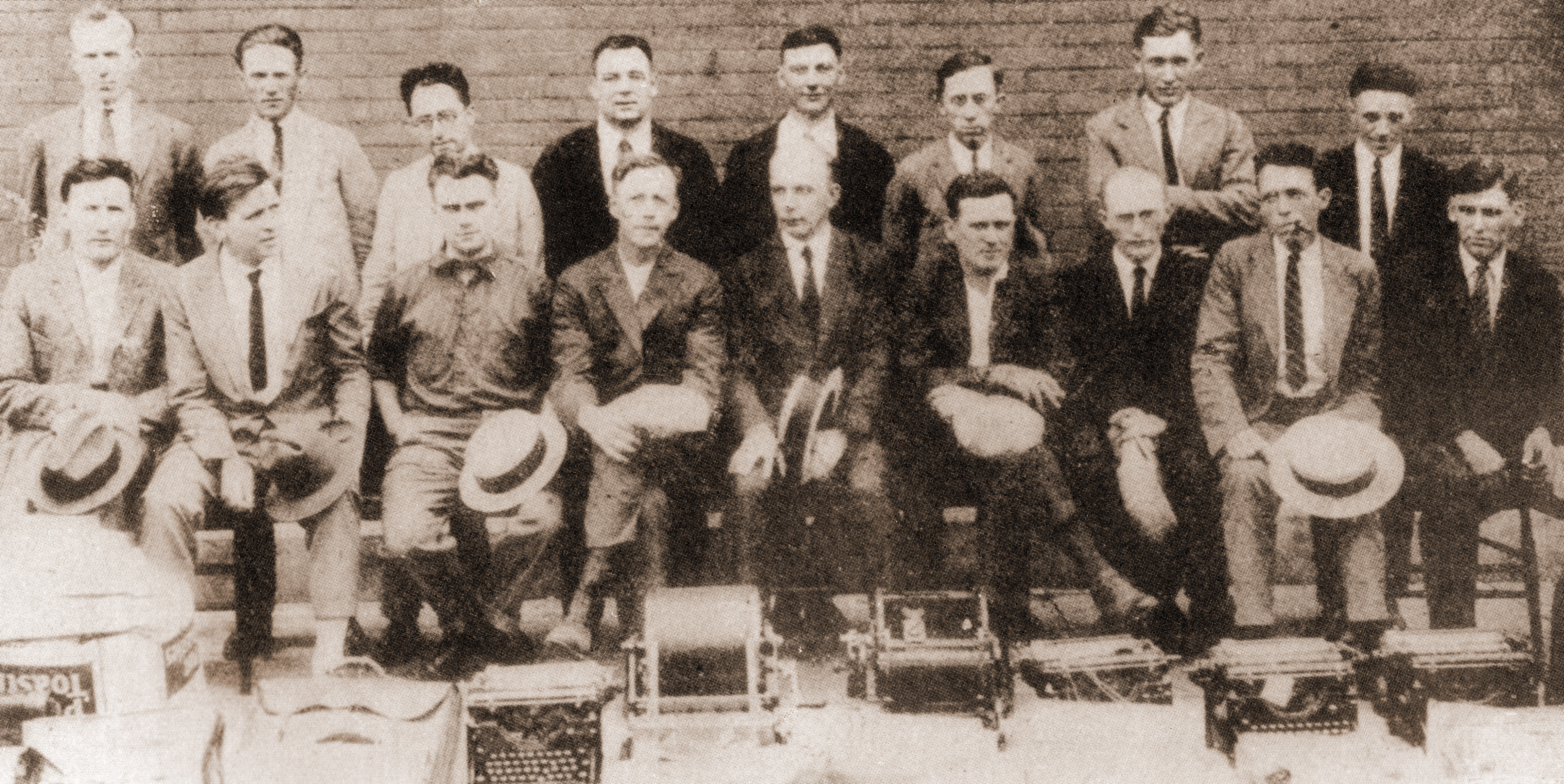
Some of those arrested in the 1922 Bridgman raid. Back row, L-R: T.J. O'Flaherty, Charles Erickson, Cyril Lambkin, Bill Dunne, John Mihelic, Alex Bail, W.E. "Bud" Reynolds, "Francis Ashworth." Seated L-R: Norman Tallentire, Caleb Harrison, Eugene Bechtold, Seth Nordling, C. E. Ruthenberg, Charles Krumbein, Max Lerner, T.R. Sullivan, Elmer McMillan.

Dunne was a delegate to the ill-fated August 1922 convention of the Communist Party of America (CPA), held in Bridgman, Michigan. He was arrested when the gathering was raided by state and federal authorities for alleged violation of the Michigan state Criminal Syndicalism law. Released on bail, Dunne was never brought to trial on these charges. During the underground period of American communism, Dunne used the pseudonyms "Driscoll" and "Donovan."

At the end of 1921, when the underground CPA established its overground sibling, the Workers Party of America (WPA), Bill Dunne was elected one of three editors of the organization's weekly newspaper, The Worker. Dunne served as the "Labor Editor" of that paper.

Dunne was elected to the central executive committee of the WPA and its executive council in 1923 and was re-elected by the convention in 1924. During the bitter factional struggles which swept the organization during the 1920s, Dunne was a supporter of the faction headed by William Z. Foster, Alexander Bittelman and James P. Cannon against that of John Pepper and C.E. Ruthenberg. Later in the 1920s, when Foster parted company with Cannon, Dunne allied himself with the latter.

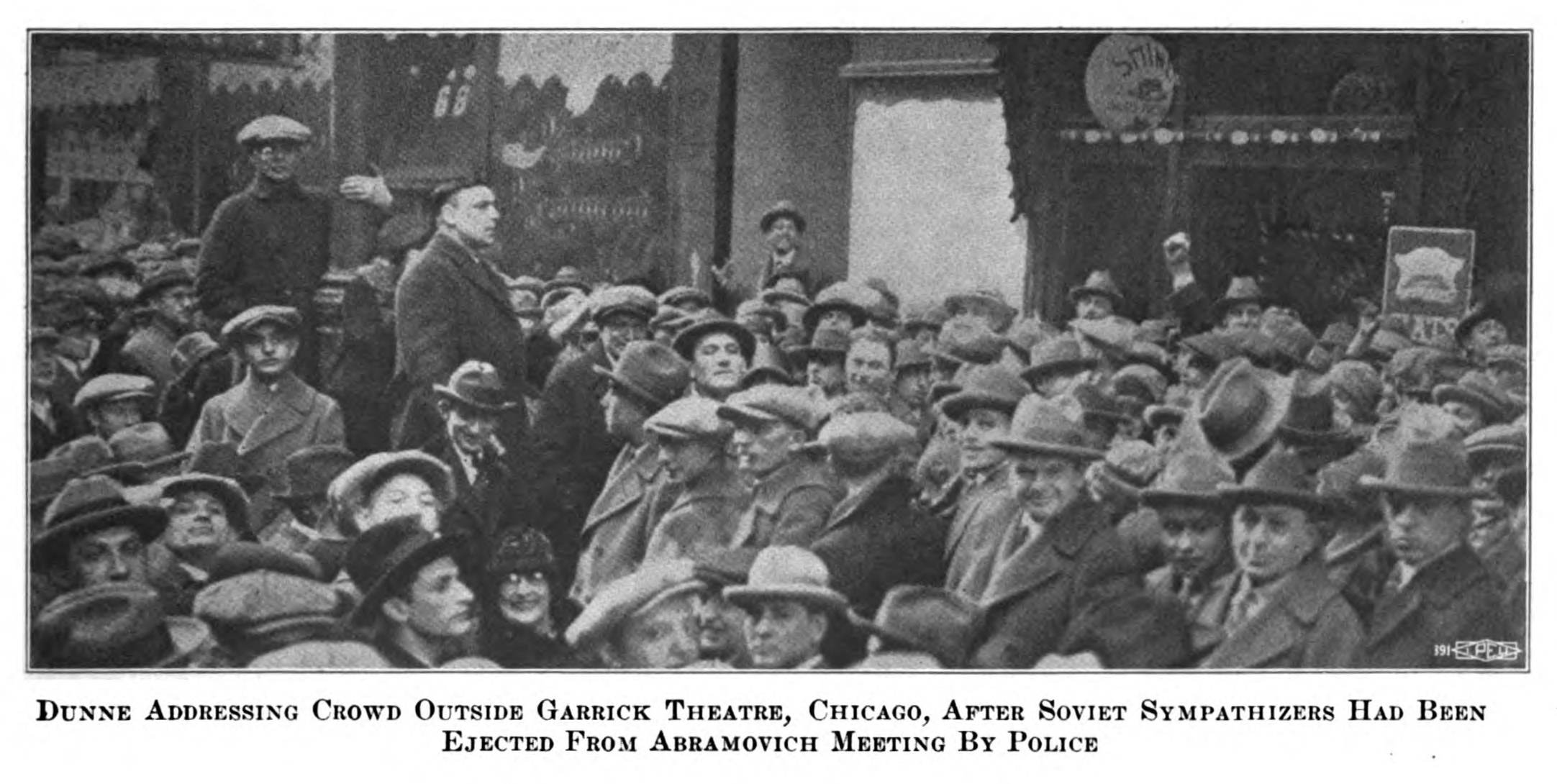
Dunne addresses a crowd outside the Garrick Theatre in Chicago c. March 1925

In 1923, Dunne was expelled from the American Federation of Labor for his communist political views and activity in organizing the so-called "left wing" of the labor movement through the Communist Party's trade union affiliate, the Trade Union Educational League. Dunne was a delegate to the 5th World Congress of the Communist International in 1924. He presented a report to the congress on the American racial situation. He was elected as an alternate member to the Executive Committee of the Communist International. He remained in Moscow during 1924 and 1925 as the representative of the Workers (Communist) Party of America to the Comintern. He was elected a member of the Comintern's Organization Bureau at the 5th Enlarged Plenum of the Communist International, held in March 1925. Later in 1925, Dunne returned to the United States to become an editor of the Communist Party's daily newspaper, The Daily Worker.

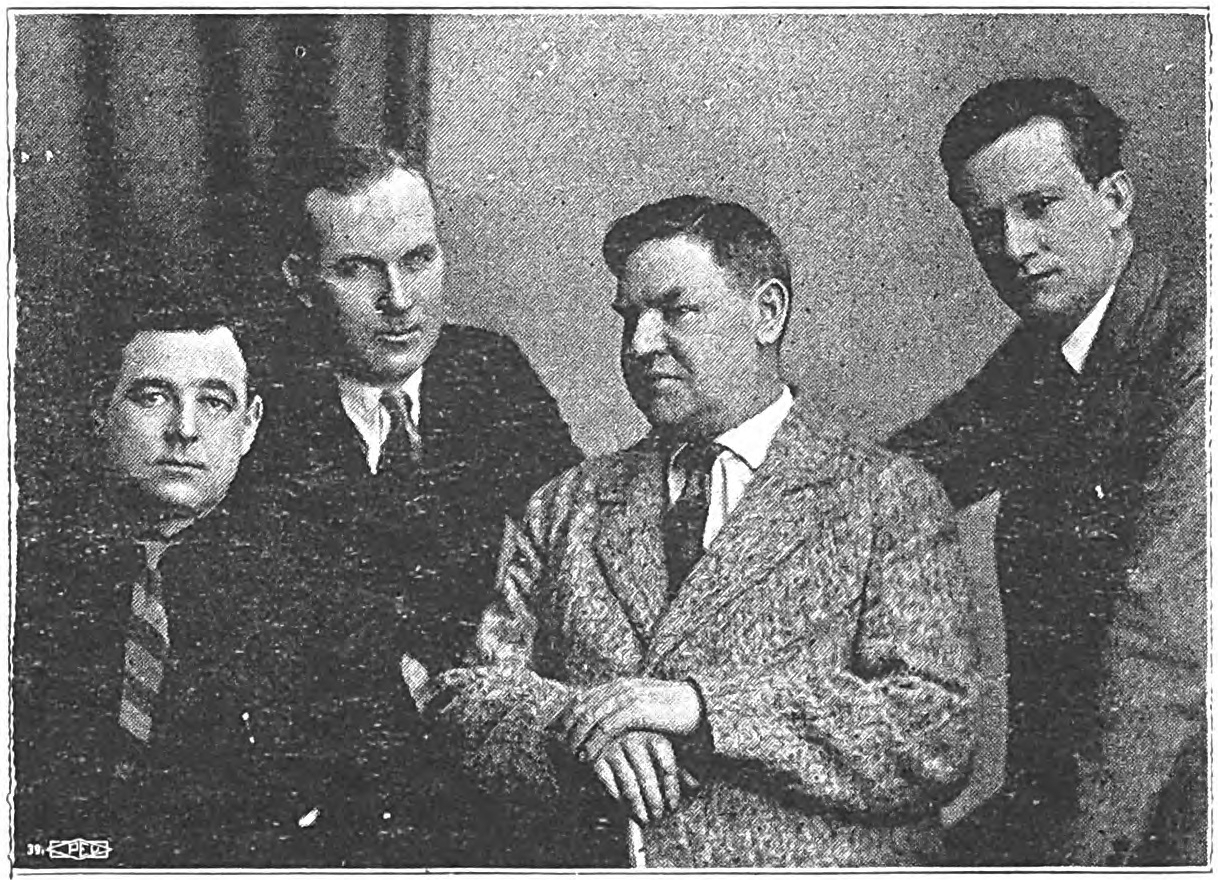
Dunne, Tom Maidhc O'Flaherty, Bill Haywood and James P. Cannon c. 1926

Dunne was an occasional candidate for political office, running for U.S. Senator from New York at the 1926 New York state election, and for Governor of New York at the 1928 New York state election, both times on the Workers ticket. In 1928 he traveled to Moscow as a delegate to the 4th World Congress of the Red International of Labor Unions (Profintern), as well as the 6th World Congress of the Communist International. He was elected a member of the Politburo of the CPUSA in 1929. In the early 1930s, he returned to the Soviet Union, where he worked as a personnel specialist in charge of the 500 or 600 Americans working at the tractor plant in Stalingrad in 1931 and 1932. With the rise to power of Earl Browder in the American Communist Party from the middle-1930s, Dunne's position and authority in the party were reduced. He was removed from the national leadership in 1934, but he remained as an editor at The Daily Worker until 1936.

Although Bill Dunne's brothers, Vincent, Miles, and Grant, were active in the American Trotskyist movement, participating in the Minneapolis Teamsters Strike of 1934, Bill Dunne was never part of that dissident communist movement. According to American communist writer Myra Page, his brothers Vincent and Miles sided with James P. Cannon (as "Cannonites") during the factionalism preceding formation of the Communist Party of the USA in 1928-1929, while Bill "stayed loyal" with William Z. Foster as a center, loyal "Fosterite" (the winning faction in 1929). In 1934 he went so far as to author a polemic pamphlet for the Communist Party against his brothers and their comrades entitled Permanent Counter-Revolution: The Role of the Trotzkyites in the Minneapolis Strikes.

In 1937, Dunne returned to the Western United States as the organizer of Communist Party district 33, which included Idaho, Montana, Wyoming, and Utah. With the goal of creating a Popular front movement in the region, Dunne worked to build front groups controlled by the Communist Party that could attract non-party members. He also worked to place Communist Party members in leadership roles within unions and civic organizations.

In 1939, Dunne worked to oppose U.S. entry into World War II on behalf of the Communist Party until 1941 when Germany invaded the Soviet Union. Thereafter, the Communist Party changed its policy to support U.S. intervention in the war, and Dunne followed suit. He worked in the Navy shipyards, joined the merchant marine, and eventually took a job as a cook at a base in the Aleutian Islands.

In 1946, Dunne was accused of having promoted a leftist faction in the Communist Party and was expelled for "left sectarianism".

In 1947, Dunne published a book, The Struggle Against Opportunism in the Labor Movement – For a Socialist United States, deriding the leadership of the CPUSA for abandoning the principles and methods of Marxism-Leninism in favor of collaborating with the Democratic Party.

Dunne spent his remaining years working in ethnic Irish politics.

== Death and legacy ==
Bill Dunne died on September 23, 1953. He was 65 years old at the time of his death.

== Works ==
- William F. Dunne's Speech at the A.F. of L. Convention, Portland, 1923. Chicago: Trade Union Educational League, n.d. [1923]. Labor Herald Library #9.
- Worker Correspondents: What? When? Where? Why? How? Chicago: Daily Worker Publishing Co., n.d. [1925]. Little Red Library #4.
- The British Strike: Its Background, Its Lessons. Chicago: Daily Worker Publishing Co., n.d. [1926].
- Our Heritage from 1776: A Working Class View of the First American Revolution. With Wolfe, Bertram D. and Jay Lovestone New York: The Workers School, n.d. [1926]
- The Threat to the Labor Movement: The Conspiracy against the Trade Unions: Efficiency Unions for the Bosses or Effective Unions for the Workers. n.c.: n.p., 1927.
- Gastonia, Citadel of the Class Struggle in the New South. New York: Workers Library Publishers, 1929.
- Permanent Counter-Revolution: The Role of the Trotzkyites in the Minneapolis Strikes. New York: Workers Library Publishers, 1934.
- The Great San Francisco General Strike: The Story of the West Coast Strike — The Bay Counties' General Strike and the Maritime Workers' Strike. New York: Workers Library Publishers, 1934.
- The Supreme Court's Challenge to Labor: The N.I.R.A. Decision a Signal for Intensified Attacks on the Workers. New York: Workers Library Publishers, 1935.
- Why Hearst Lies about Communism: Three Open Letters to William Randolph Hearst. New York: Workers Library Publishers, 1935.
- The Struggle against Opportunism in the Labor Movement: For a Socialist United States. New York: New York Communications Committee, 1947.
