= Caleb Harrison =

American politician

Harrison on a Socialist Labor Party campaign poster, 1916

Caleb Harrison (September 20, 1879 – June 8, 1938) was an American politician and vice presidential candidate in the 1916 United States presidential election as Arthur E. Reimer's running mate. He and Reimer were members of the Socialist Labor Party of America. Harrison was born in Reading, Berks, Pennsylvania to William Henry Harrison and Sarah Jane Focht.

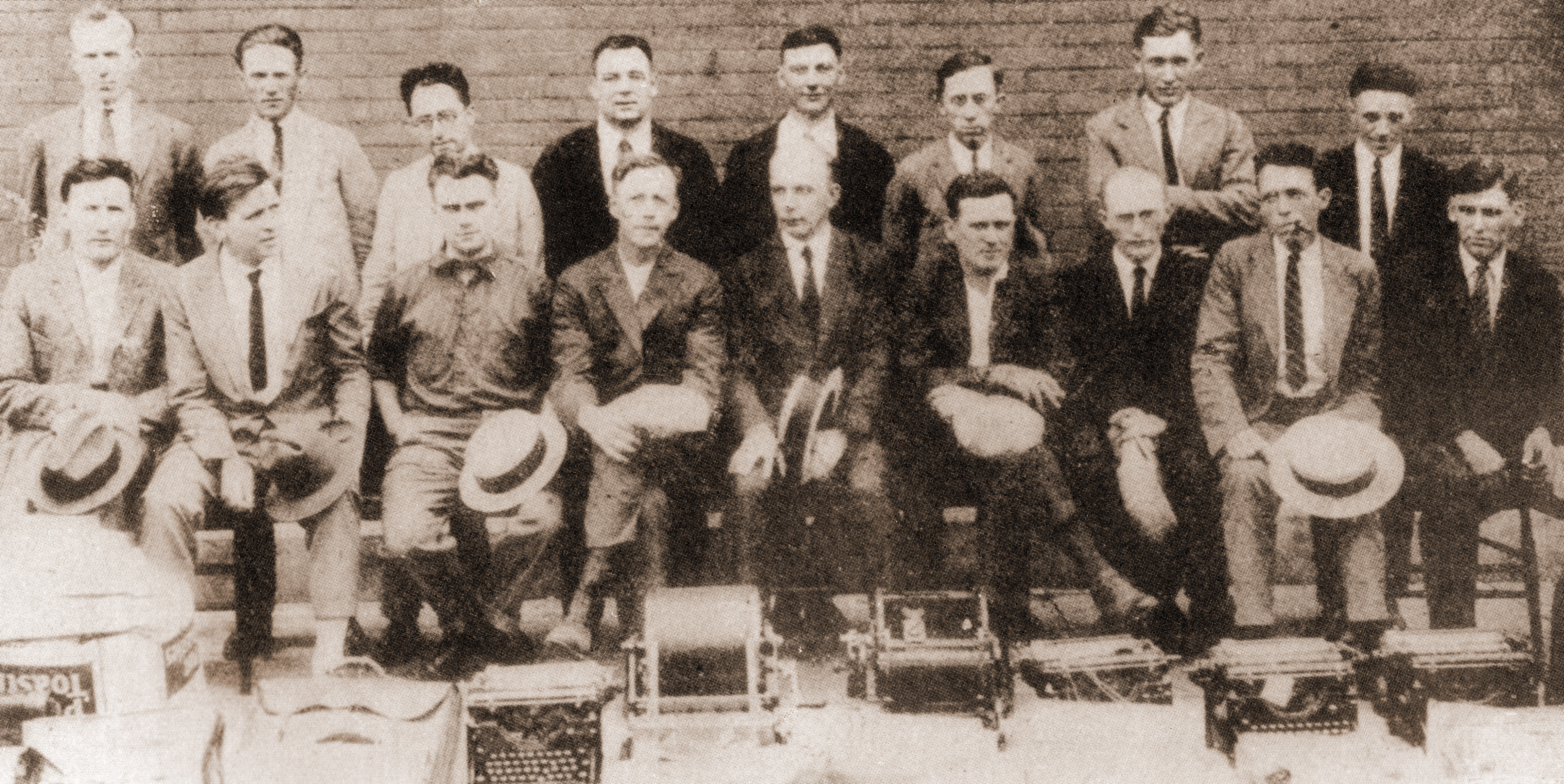
Some of those arrested in the 1922 Bridgman raid. Back row, L-R: T.J. O'Flaherty, Charles Erickson, Cyril Lambkin, Bill Dunne, John Mihelic, Alex Bail, W.E. "Bud" Reynolds, "Francis Ashworth." Seated L-R: Norman Tallentire, Caleb Harrison, Eugene Bechtold, Seth Nordling, C. E. Ruthenberg, Charles Krumbein, Max Lerner, T.R. Sullivan, Elmer McMillan.

Harrison gave lectures about his opposition to militarism and the high cost of living in Moline, Illinois. He later joined the Communist Party of America. He died at the age of 58 on June 8, 1938, in Chicago, Illinois.
