= Alex Bail =

American labor leader

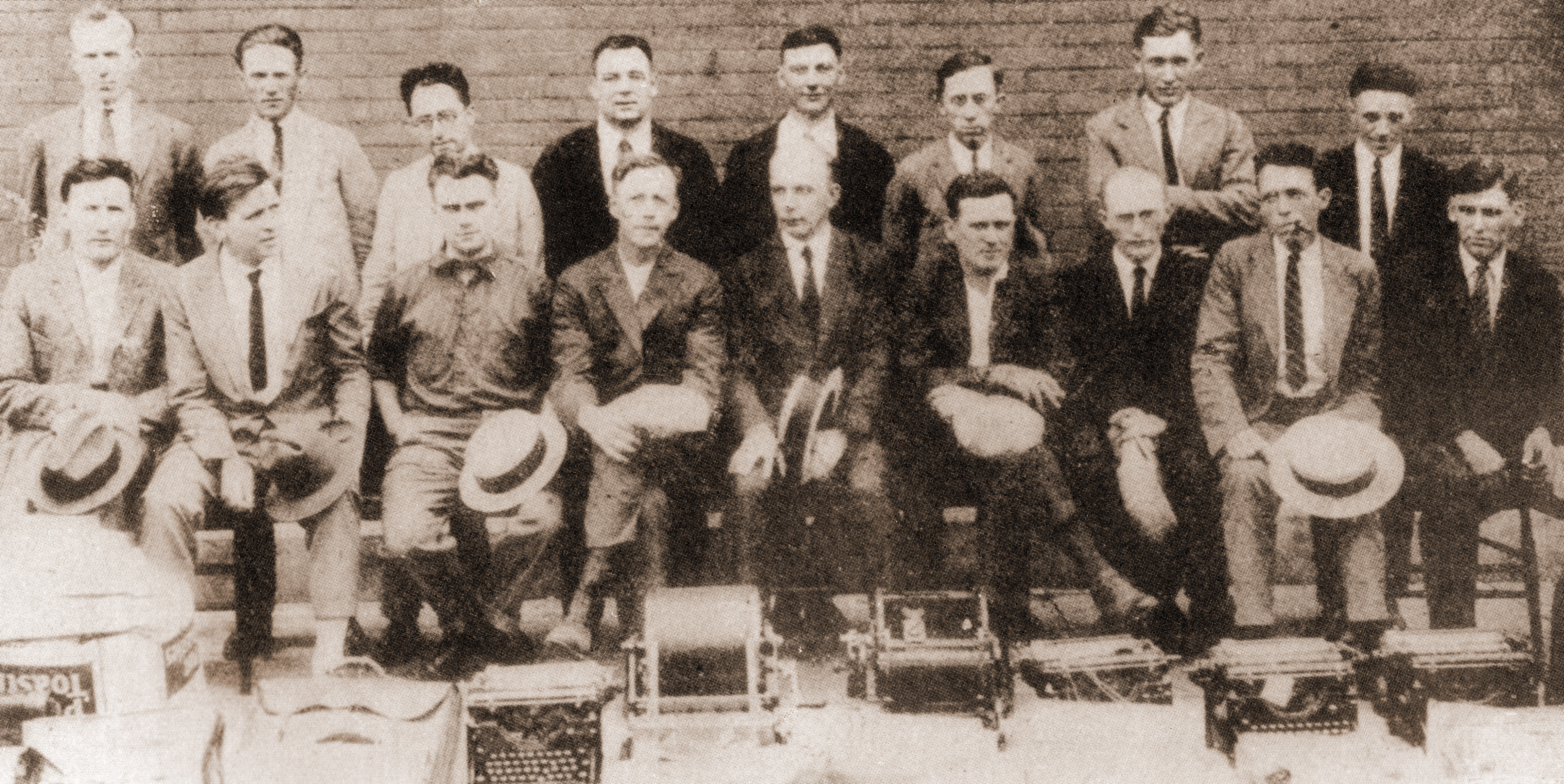
Some of those arrested in the 1922 Bridgman raid. Back row, L-R: T.J. O'Flaherty, Charles Erickson, Cyril Lambkin, Bill Dunne, John Mihelic, Alex Bail, W.E. "Bud" Reynolds, "Francis Ashworth." Seated L-R: Norman Tallentire, Caleb Harrison, Eugene Bechtold, Seth Nordling, C. E. Ruthenberg, Charles Krumbein, Max Lerner, T.R. Sullivan, Elmer McMillan.

Alex Bail (1900 – June 8, 1973) was an American radical and union leader.

== Biography ==
=== Early years ===
Alex Bail was born in the Russian Empire in 1900.

=== Communist years ===
Bail entered the US labor movement in 1922. He was also an early member of the Communist Party of America, arrested in August that year attending the parties underground second convention in Bridgman, Michigan.

Bail attended the third national convention of the Workers Party of America (Dec 30, 1923-Jan 2, 1924) representing the third district, centered in Philadelphia. At the party's 5th convention in 1927 he was made a candidate member of the Central Executive Committee, and by the end of the year was district organizer in the party's first district, centered in Boston. He remained in that position for the rest of his tenure as a member of the American Communist Party.

He was again elected CEC candidate at the party's 6th Convention in March 1929, but soon left the party after the expulsion of party leader Jay Lovestone and a group of about 200 loyalists around him.

When Lovestone and his co-thinkers established a formal organization called the Communist Party (Majority Group), Bail enlisted in that organization as a member of the group's original National Council. He stayed with the organization for the duration of its existence.

While in the Lovestone organization he adopted a "party name" "George F. Miles." In the late 1930s he was put in charge of the Lovestonites operation in the United Auto Workers assisting Homer Martin in his fight with the communists within that union. The factional fight would eventually lead to Martin's group being ousted from leadership of the UAW and leading a rump organization back into the AFL. During this period he was assisted by his wife, Eve Smith, who became head of the UAW's Women's Auxiliary.

=== Later career ===
By 1948 Bail had emerged as the secretary-treasurer of the Playthings, Jewelry and Novelty Workers' International Union, CIO. In 1950 he was member of an ad hoc committee of New York area CIO officials that was formed to "financially and morally" support the Transport Workers Union of America in their conflict with the New York Board of Transportation over wages and hours of work for transit workers. The committee pressured Mayor William O'Dwyer into naming a fact finding commission to see if this financially tenable. In 1952 Bail became president of the Playthings, Jewelry and Novelty Workers Union after the executive board expelled A. H. Esposito and his Local 223 for signing a contract with a jewelry box factory in Queens in the midst of a strike.

In 1954 the Plaything, Jewelry and Novelty Workers International Union voted to merge with the Retail, Wholesale and Department Store Union. The PJNWIU had about 20,000 members at the time of the merger. Bail became an executive vice president of the RWDSU. He retired in 1970, becoming vice-president emeritus.

=== Death and legacy ===
Alex Bail died June 8, 1973.
