= Cyril Lambkin =

Communist Party organizer

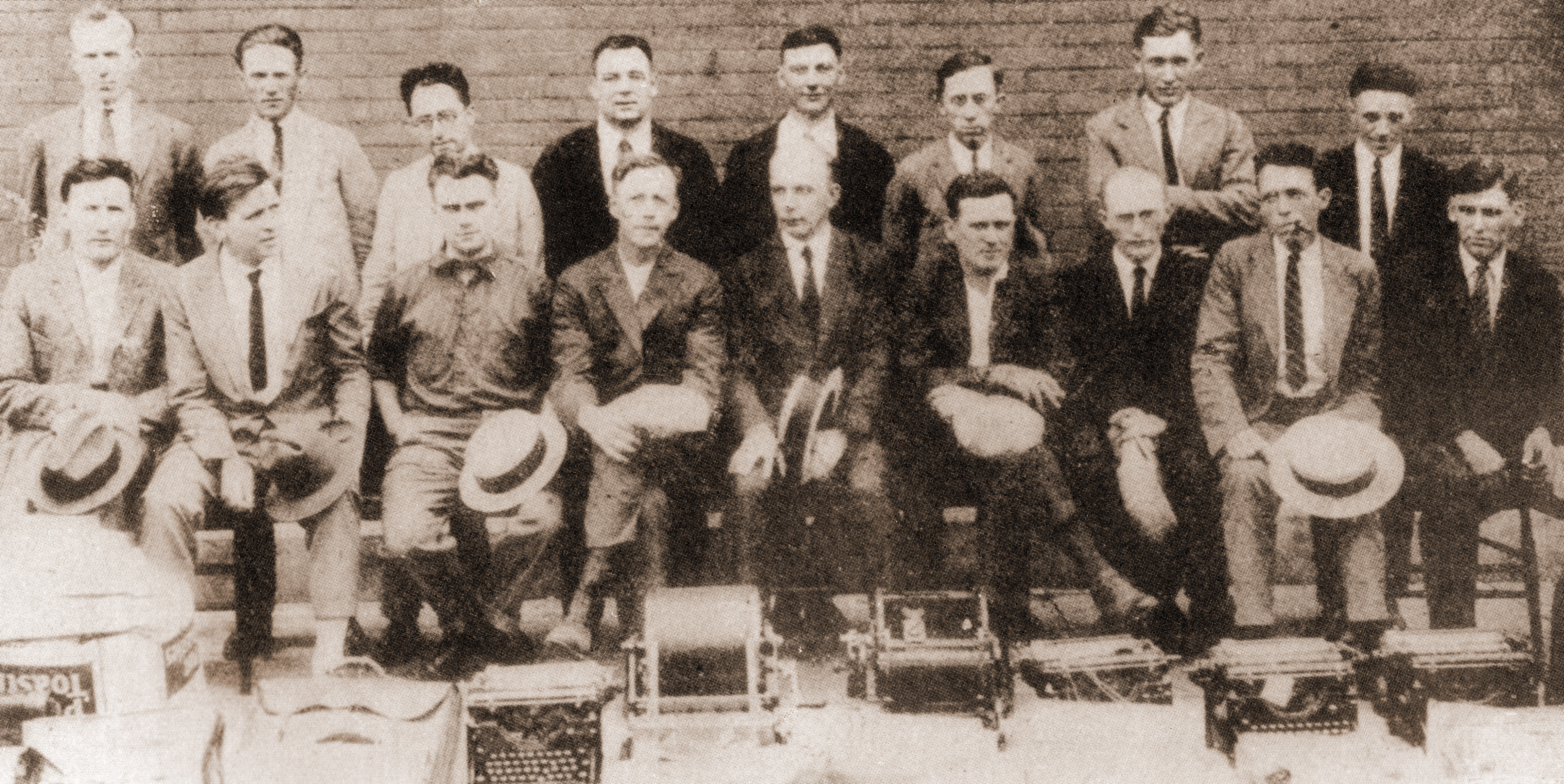
Some of those arrested in the 1922 Bridgman raid. Back row, L-R: T.J. O'Flaherty, Charles Erickson, Cyril Lambkin, Bill Dunne, John Mihelic, Alex Bail, W.E. "Bud" Reynolds, "Francis Ashworth." Seated L-R: Norman Tallentire, Caleb Harrison, Eugene Bechtold, Seth Nordling, C. E. Ruthenberg, Charles Krumbein, Max Lerner, T.R. Sullivan, Elmer McMillan.

Cyril Lambkin (April 2, 1891 - ) was an American Communist Party organizer.

== Biography ==
Lambkin was born in Papile, in the Kovno Governorate of the Russian Empire (present-day Lithuania), and immigrated to the United States in 1906. Lambkin began his political career in the Young People's Socialist League in 1908 before joining the Socialist Party a few years later while living in Detroit.

Lambkin was arrested August 22, 1922, while attending the Bridgman Convention of the Communist Party of America. Due to the secrecy of the meeting, Lambkin used the party alias "Ames" during the convention. Lambkin swore that he had been beaten while in jail, with the involvement of Jacob Spolansky. On 1925, Lambkin ran for election as a Michigan Supreme Court Justice on the Workers Party ticket. Lambkin ran as the Party's nominee for Michigan Attorney General in the 1926 election. In 1926, Lambkin also served as the secretary of the Detroit local branch of the International Labor Defense. In this role, Lambkin helped organize a resolution sent to Massachusetts Governor Alvan T. Fuller, protesting the execution of Sacco and Vanzetti.

Lambkin worked as an official for the Amtorg Trading Corporation. Working with Leon Josephson, Lambkin created contracts that insisted that American firms could only trade goods to the Soviet Union if they allowed Soviet inspectors to view their manufacturing plants. Lambkin later became the owner of Four Continent Book Corporation, the largest importer of books from the Soviet Union. Lambkin also worked as the National Secretary of the Friends of the Soviet Union. By 1953, Lambkin had left the United States and was living in Moscow.
