= Norman Tallentire =

American Communist Party organizer (1886–1953)

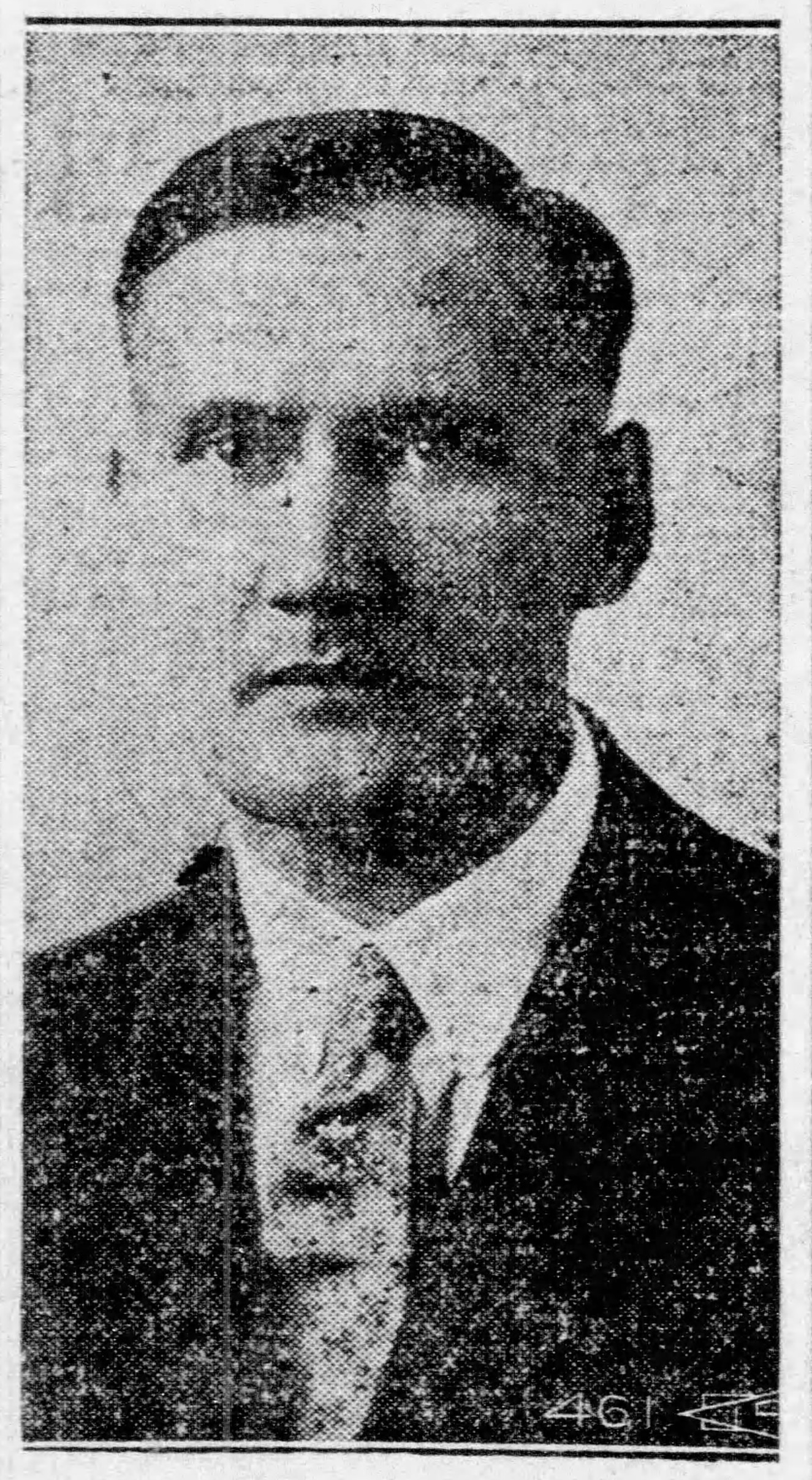
Tallentire c. 1924

Norman Henderson Tallentire (October 10, 1886 – November 8, 1953) was a British-born Communist Party organizer in the United States.

== Early life ==
Tallentire was born in England, the son of a miner and preacher, and emigrated to Canada in 1907.

== Career ==
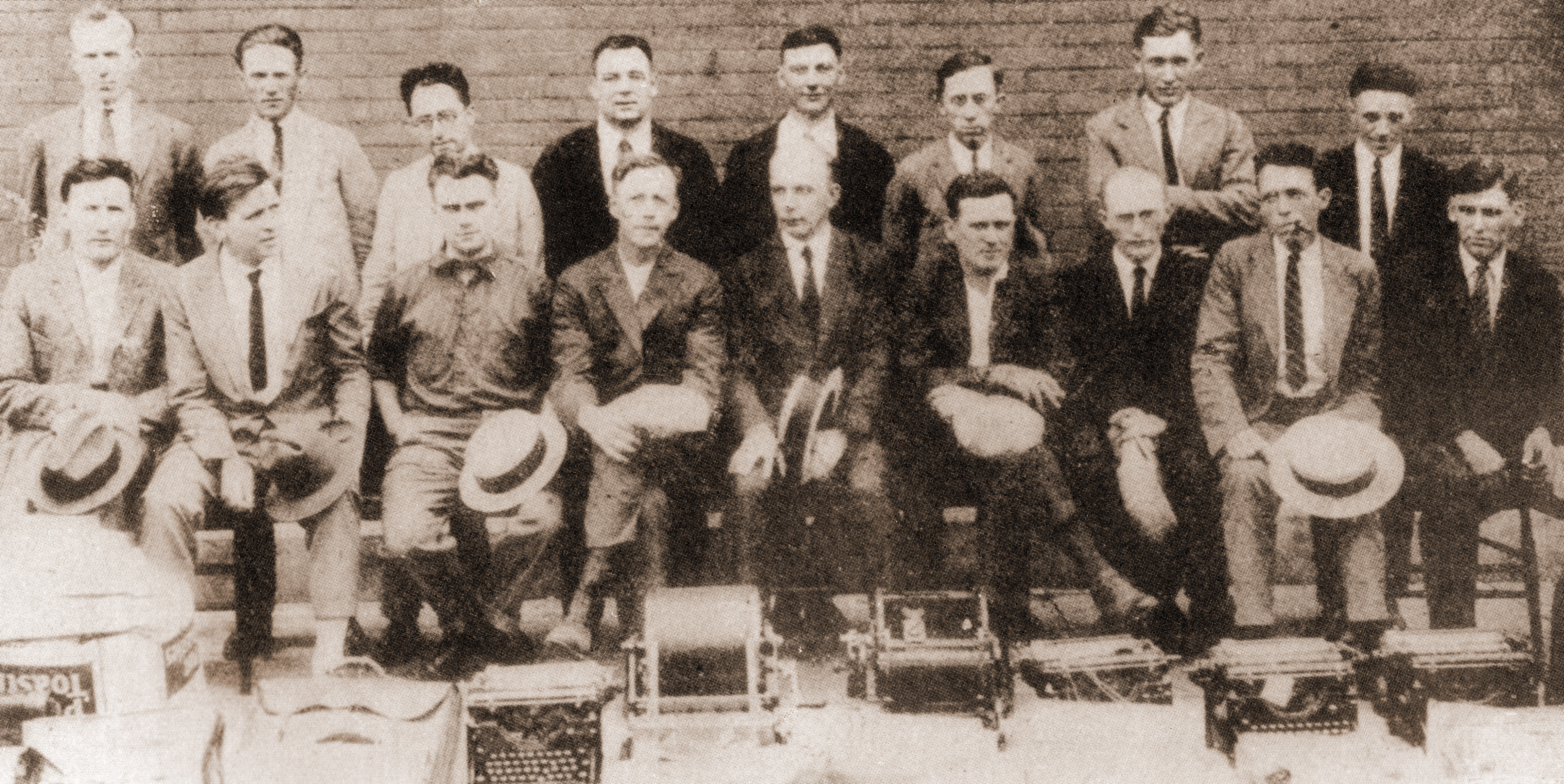
Some of those arrested in the 1922 Bridgman raid. Back row, L-R: T.J. O'Flaherty, Charles Erickson, Cyril Lambkin, Bill Dunne, John Mihelic, Alex Bail, W.E. "Bud" Reynolds, "Francis Ashworth." Seated L-R: Norman Tallentire, Caleb Harrison, Eugene Bechtold, Seth Nordling, C. E. Ruthenberg, Charles Krumbein, Max Lerner, T.R. Sullivan, Elmer McMillan.

Trained as a carpenter, Tallentire established a business in Denver, Colorado, before becoming active in leftist politics. In August 1922, Tallentire was arrested in the raid of a secret meeting of the Communist Party of America in Bridgman, Michigan.

For eight months starting in September 1924, Tallentire was the district organizer for the Communist Party in Seattle, where he attempted to work with local Filipino union leaders to increase Filipino membership in the Party. After the collapse of the underground Communist Party in 1926, Tallentire went to Baltimore to organize the city's Party branches. In 1927, he was the Party's District Organizer in Kansas City.

In 1932, Tallentire traveled to the Soviet Union in the Communist Party delegation to celebrate the fourteenth anniversary of the Russian Revolution. Tallentire served as the national organizer of the Friends of the Soviet Union, and was also the assistant national secretary of the International Labor Defense.

Rockwell Kent described him as "a lifelong agitator of men's consciences toward social justice, a firm upholder of the dignity of man and a literally restless organizer of the underprivileged". He was known for his oratory and frequently quoted poetry in his speeches. George Charney compared his speeches to William Jennings Bryan for the way he "interspersed dread prophecy and soothing homily".

== Later life and death ==
Tallentire was threatened with deportation from America under the McCarran-Walter Act. He was arrested in 1951 and held on Ellis Island. He died of a heart attack during this deportation hearing. Vito Marcantonio defended Tallentire in the hearings, describing the defense as part of the struggle "to defeat the illegal, undemocratic, unconstitutional Walter-McCarran Act". Some of Tallentire's colleagues blamed the stress of the deportation hearings for his heart attack and death.
