= C. E. Ruthenberg =

American politician (1882–1927)

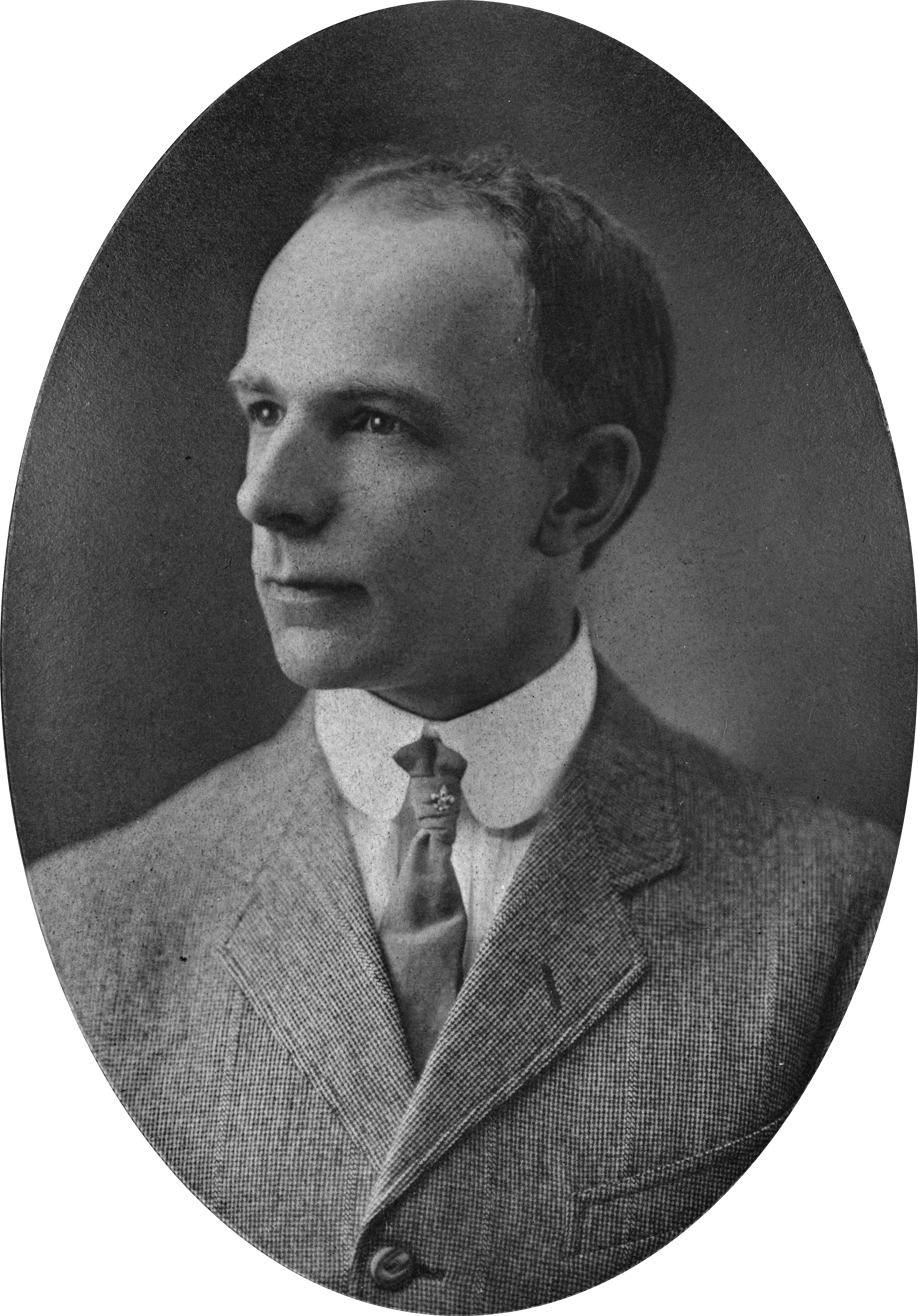
- Ruthenberg c. 1911

Executive Secretary of the Workers (Communist) Party of America (Note: Titled "Workers Party of America" until August 1925.)
- In office December 23, 1921 – March 1, 1927
- Preceded by: Charles Dirba
- Succeeded by: Jay Lovestone

Executive Secretary of the Communist Party of America
- In office September 1, 1919 – April 18, 1920
- Preceded by: Position established
- Succeeded by: Charles Dirba

Personal details
- Born: Charles Emil Ruthenberg; July 9, 1882 Cleveland, Ohio, U.S.
- Died: March 1, 1927 (aged 44) Chicago, Illinois, U.S.
- Resting place: Kremlin Wall Necropolis, Moscow
- Party: Socialist (1909–1919); Communist (1919–1927)
- Other political affiliations: Workers (1921–1927)
- Spouse: Rosaline "Rose" Nickel (m. 1904)
- Children: Daniel
- Education: Columbia University

Charles Emil Ruthenberg (July 9, 1882 – March 1, 1927) was an American Marxist politician who was the founder and first head of the Communist Party USA (CPUSA). He is one of five Americans to be buried in the Kremlin Wall Necropolis.

== Early life, education, and early career ==
Charles Emil Ruthenberg was born July 9, 1882, in Cleveland, Ohio, the son of Wilhelmina (née Lau) and August Charles Ruthenberg. Ruthenberg's parents were ethnic Germans and Lutherans who emigrated from Prussia in 1882. In America, young "Charlie's" father first worked in America on the docks of the Cuyahoga River as a longshoreman. In later years the elder Ruthenberg went into business for himself with a son-in-law, tending bar at a saloon frequented evenings by those who worked on the docks.

Ruthenberg graduated from the local parochial Lutheran school in June 1896.

He went to work in a bookstore, attending Berkey and Dyke's Business College in the evenings for a ten-month course in bookkeeping, accounting, and typing.

He entered Columbia University in 1903. During this time period he also worked as the bookkeeper and sales manager for the Selmar Hess Publishing Company, overseeing more than 30 salesmen throughout the Middle West. He graduated from Columbia Law School in 1909.

== Political career ==
=== Socialist years (1908–1918) ===
Ruthenberg's first political attraction was to Tom L. Johnson, a Single Taxer and reform mayor of Cleveland from 1901 to 1909. Ruthenberg was drawn to more radical left-wing politics, and in mid-1908 began calling himself a socialist.

During his time at Columbia University, which he entered in 1903, he first became involved with anarchist groups. After graduating from Columbia Law School in 1909, he joined the Socialist Party of America (SPA).

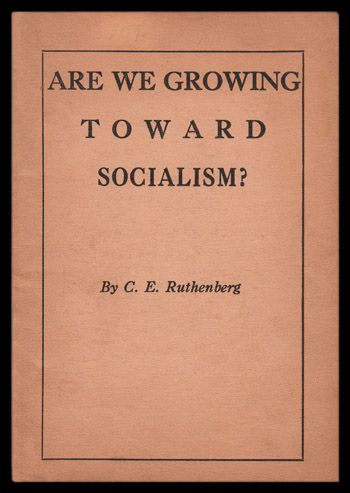
Cover of Ruthenberg's first political pamphlet, published in 1917 by the local Cleveland Socialist Party. According to WorldCat less than a dozen copies are known to exist.

Ruthenberg was an organizer for and, later, secretary of Local Cuyahoga County from 1909 to 1919. In addition he was on the Ohio State Executive Committee of the SPA from 1911 to 1916, where he edited the newspapers The Cleveland Socialist (1911–1913) and Socialist News (1914–1919). He also contributed material to the official organ of the Socialist Party of Ohio, The Ohio Socialist. He was elected to the National Committee of the Socialist Party in 1915 but was defeated by Arthur LeSueur at the annual meeting for election to the party's governing National Executive Committee.

During this time Ruthenberg traveled to many cities throughout the American Northeast and Midwest, speaking to labor groups, trade union organizations, and anti-war groups, building a network of contacts. He was associated with the far left so-called "Impossibilist" wing of the SPA, which had little hope for the efficacy of ameliorative reform, seeking instead revolutionary socialist transformation.

Ruthenberg was a frequent candidate on the ticket of the Socialist Party. His first electoral failure came in 1910, when he ran for Ohio's state treasurer on the Socialist ticket. In 1911 he ran for mayor of Cleveland, in 1912 for Governor of Ohio, for U.S. Senate in 1914. In 1915 he ran again for mayor of Cleveland and in 1916 he ran for United States Congressman. In 1917 he made his third run for mayor of Cleveland (receiving 27,000 votes of 100,000 cast), followed by his second run for Congress in 1918. His fourth and final run for mayor of Cleveland came in 1919.

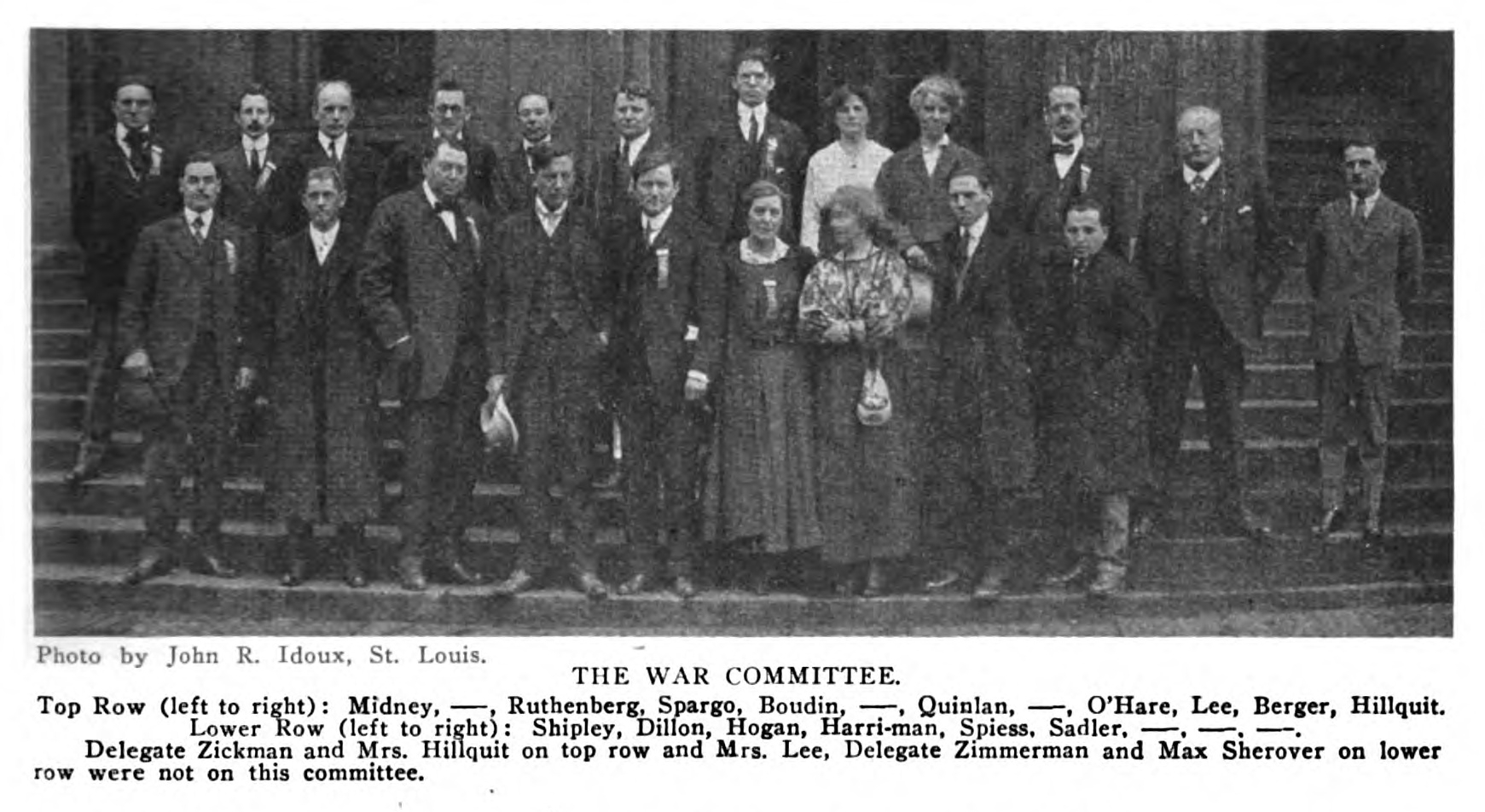
Ruthenberg (top row, third from left) with members of the Socialist Party's War Committee at the 1917 Emergency National Convention.

Ruthenberg was a delegate to the seminal 1917 Emergency National Convention of the SPA. There he was elected to the Committee on War and Militarism and was one of three primary authors of the aggressively antimilitarist St. Louis program, along with Morris Hillquit and Algernon Lee.

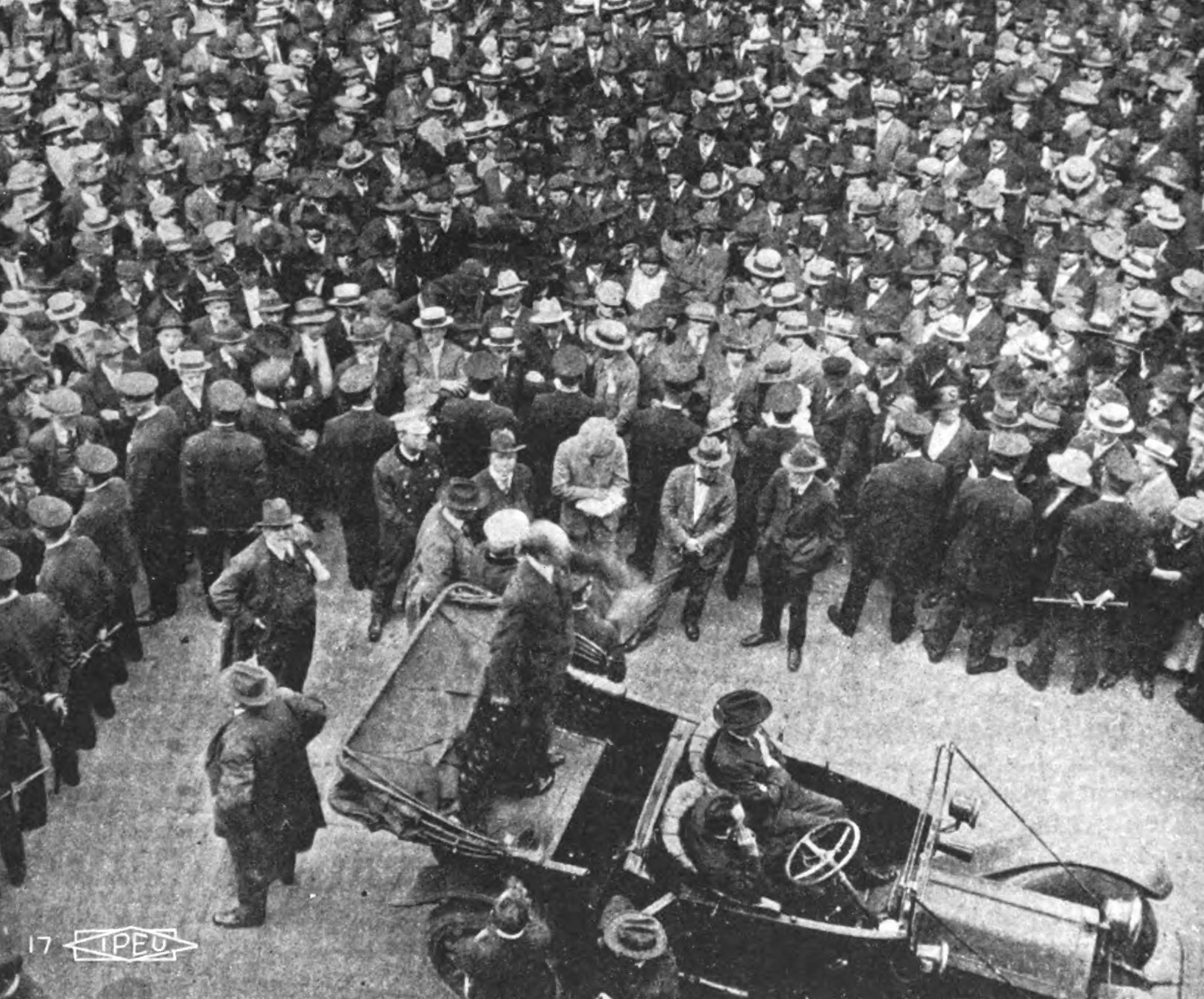
Ruthenberg speaks at a May Day rally in Cleveland, 1917

After American entry into World War I, Ruthenberg continued to publicly attack the imperialist conflict and America's participation in it. He was charged with violating the Espionage Act, accused of obstructing the draft in connection with a speech given at a rally on May 17, 1917. Also charged at the same time were Alfred Wagenknecht and Charles Baker. They were tried together in July 1917 and sentenced to one year in the Ohio State Penitentiary, a decision upheld by the U.S. Supreme Court on January 15, 1918. Informed of this decision, he issued a statement declaring:

The Supreme Court has decided we must spend a year in jail. The crime for which we are convicted is truth telling. We believe in certain principles; we fought for those principles, and we go to jail ostensibly for inducing a certain Alphones Schue not to register. The charge is merely an excuse.... The important fact is that the ruling class feared our message to the workers and tried to silence that message. That fact should make a hundred willing workers take up the work we lay down....

Cartoon of Ruthenberg, Alfred Wagenknecht, and Charles Baker in the potato patch of the Canton Workhouse from a 1917 pamphlet collecting speeches from their trial.

Ruthenberg, Wagenknecht, and Baker served almost 11 months of their sentence and were released on December 8, 1918.

=== 1919 Cleveland May Day Riot ===
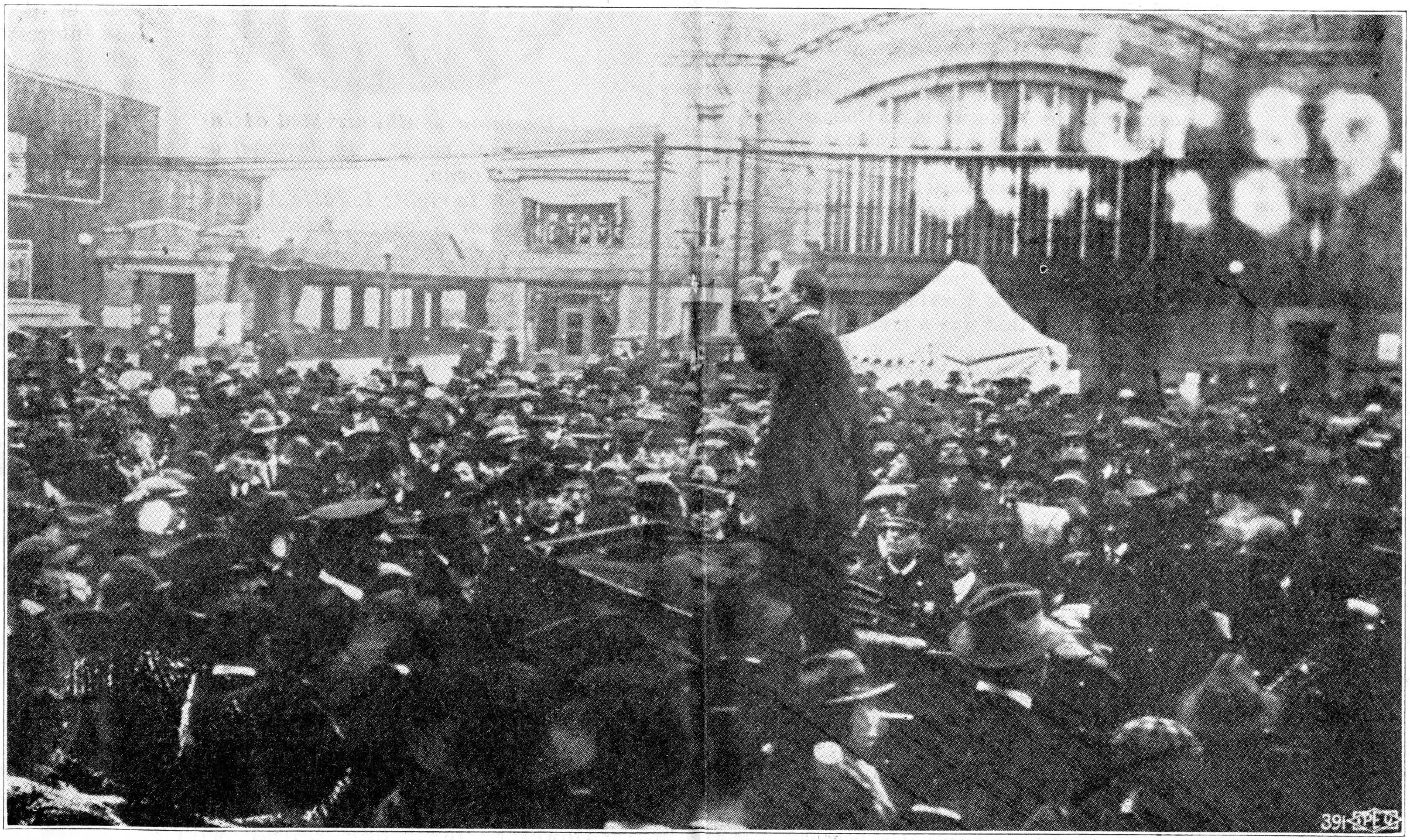
Ruthenberg speaks at an anti-militarist rally in Cleveland, 1918

Freed from prison in December 1918, Ruthenberg dove in with both feet to the burgeoning left wing movement rocking the Socialist Party. May Day of 1919 was an event of enormous enthusiasm and great fear. A gigantic assembly was planned in Cleveland, in which four parades of marchers, many waving red flags, came together in the public square to hear speeches and rally for freedom for Eugene V. Debs and Tom Mooney and the adoption of the 6-hour day and the $1 minimum wage. As many as 20,000 people are said to have participated in the march, with 20 to 30,000 more people lining the streets to watch. Ruthenberg later described the events that followed:

When the head of the line was within a block of the Public Square the first trouble occurred. An officer in the uniform of the Red Cross jumped from a "Victory" Loan truck and endeavored to take a red flag which a soldier in uniform was carrying at the head of the procession. A scuffle followed in which other soldiers from the truck and some businessmen joined. During the scuffle one of these businessmen drew a revolver and wildly threatened the workers in the procession. In five minutes, however, the struggle was over. The lieutenant and his supporters were driven back to the sidewalk, the head of the line reformed, and with the red flag still flying, marched on to the Public Square.

Suddenly, the police made their appearance:

They came down Superior Ave., which divides the "Square" into northern and southern sections, headed by the mounted squad, followed by auto load after load. The newspapers later reported that 700 men had been concentrated at the Central Station, who now descended upon the marchers.... The first thousand or so of workers marched onto the square and took possession of the "Victory" Loan speakers' stand, which had been built over the stone blocks placed on the Public Square for the use of speakers at public meetings... The chairman was about to introduce [me] as the first speaker when an officer and a few soldiers tried to climb to the platform, demanding that the soldier that held the red flag give it up... [Then], without warning, a squad of mounted police dashed into the audience, driving their horses over the assembled workers and clubbing them as they went."

A riot ensued, pitting the police and their supporters (backed by tanks) against the marchers. Two marchers were killed in the fighting, hundreds injured, and about 150 arrested in this Cleveland May Day Riot. Ruthenberg was charged for incitement to murder in connection with this event but no conviction was obtained.

=== Formation of the CPUSA ===
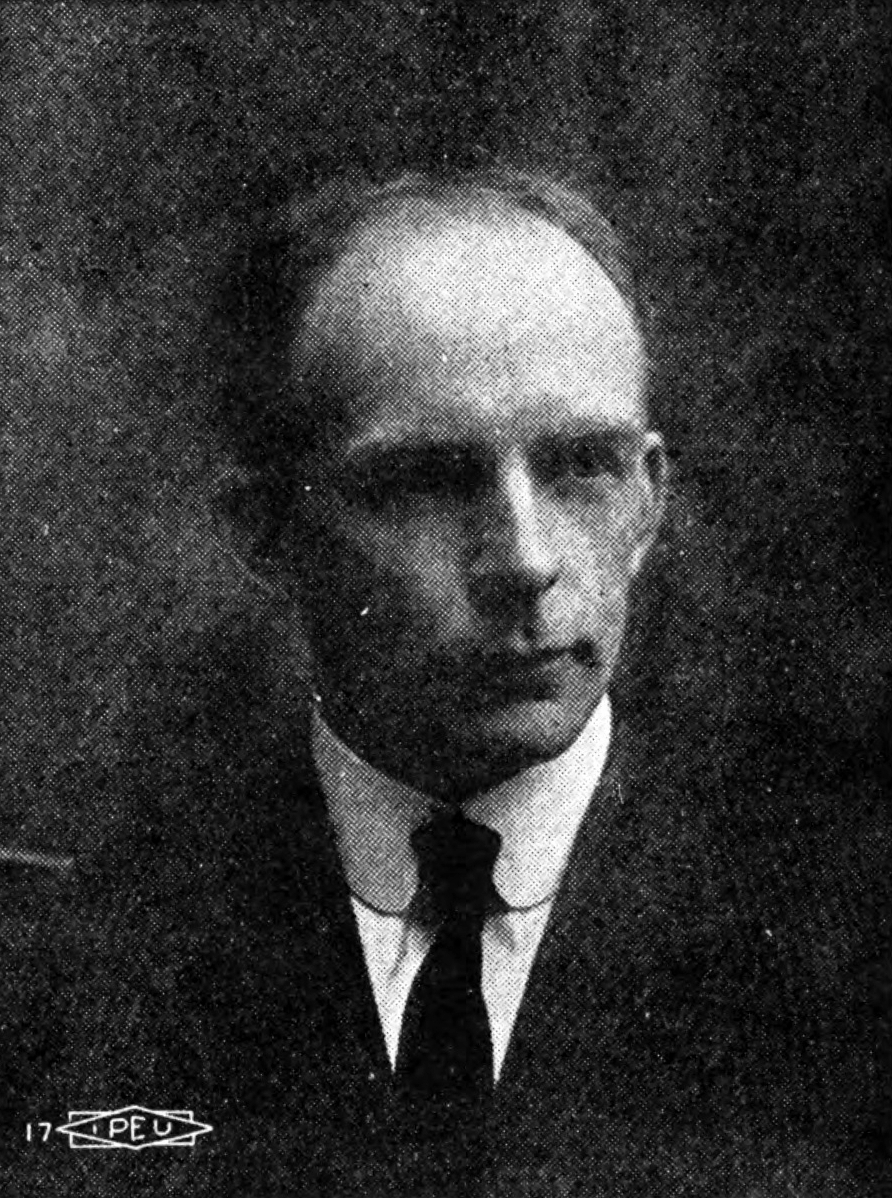
Ruthenberg c. 1918

Ruthenberg was an early endorser of the Left Wing Manifesto written by Louis C. Fraina and around which the formal Left Wing Section of the Socialist Party congealed. He was a Left Wing-supported candidate for the Socialist Party's governing National Executive Committee in the party election of 1919, the result of which was overturned by the outgoing NEC ostensibly on the grounds of election fraud carried out by some of the branches associated with the party's language federations.

Ruthenberg was a delegate to the June 1919 Convention of the Left Wing Section and was elected there as a member of the faction's governing National Council. He was initially supportive of the tactic of continuing to fight "to win the Socialist Party for the Left Wing" at its forthcoming 1919 Emergency National Convention in Chicago, but in the face of federation pressure for immediate formation of a Communist Party USA and the apparently hopeless task faced by Wagenknecht & Co., he shifted his support to the Federations and their call for an immediate Communist Party.

Dominated as it was sure to be by the Russian, Lithuanian, Polish, and Latvian language federations, the anglophonic Ruthenberg was a valuable commodity to federation leaders like Alexander Stoklitsky, Nicholas Hourwich, and Joseph Stilson. Nor did Ruthenberg owe any allegiance to the Socialist Party of Michigan, led by John Keracher and Dennis Batt. Therefore, Ruthenberg made an ideal candidate to head the new organization, which was established in Chicago on September 1, 1919, as the Communist Party of America (CPA). While decisive authority on the floor of the convention and on the Central Executive Committee which it elected remained under the control of the so-called "Russian Federations," he was elected by the Chicago conclave as the first Executive Secretary of the new organization. Ironically, it was his old Ohio party comrade and prison mate, Alfred Wagenknecht, who was elected to head the rival Communist Labor Party of America in the aftermath of the failed effort to win control of the Socialist Party at its August 1919 Convention.

A period of bitter and acrimonious rivalry followed, in which both of the competing American communist organizations sought to win the favor (and financial support) of the Communist International (Comintern). Adding to the complexity of the situation, the Socialist Labor Party of America and the Socialist Party of America sought affiliation with the Comintern as well. The Comintern was adamant about its structure, however, and it sought one and only one centralized organization in each country. Merger between the CPA and CLP was demanded.

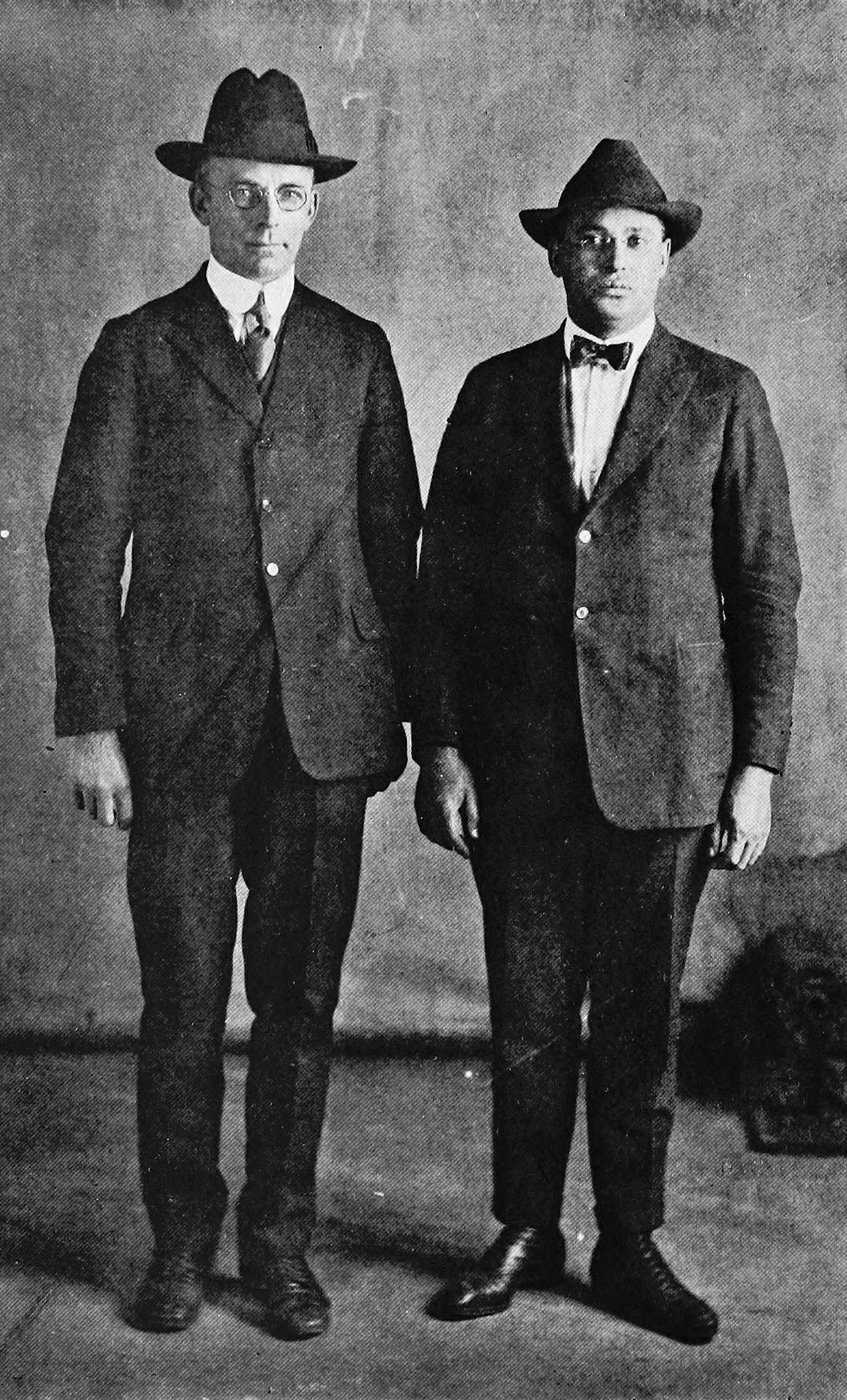
Ruthenberg (left) with Isaac Edward Ferguson c. 1920

The fulfillment of the Comintern's demand for unity proved to be no simple task, however, and the history of the next three years are a complex tale of splits, mergers, secret conventions, organized caucuses, and parallel organizations that lies outside of the scope of this presentation. In outline terms, a fight erupted among the leadership of the CPA in 1920 and Ruthenberg, together with a group of his English-speaking adherents such as Isaac Ferguson and Jay Lovestone as well as the Chicago-based section of the Russian federation, exited the organization (along with a major part of the group's funds) in April 1920 and joined with the Communist Labor Party to form the United Communist Party (UCP) in May.

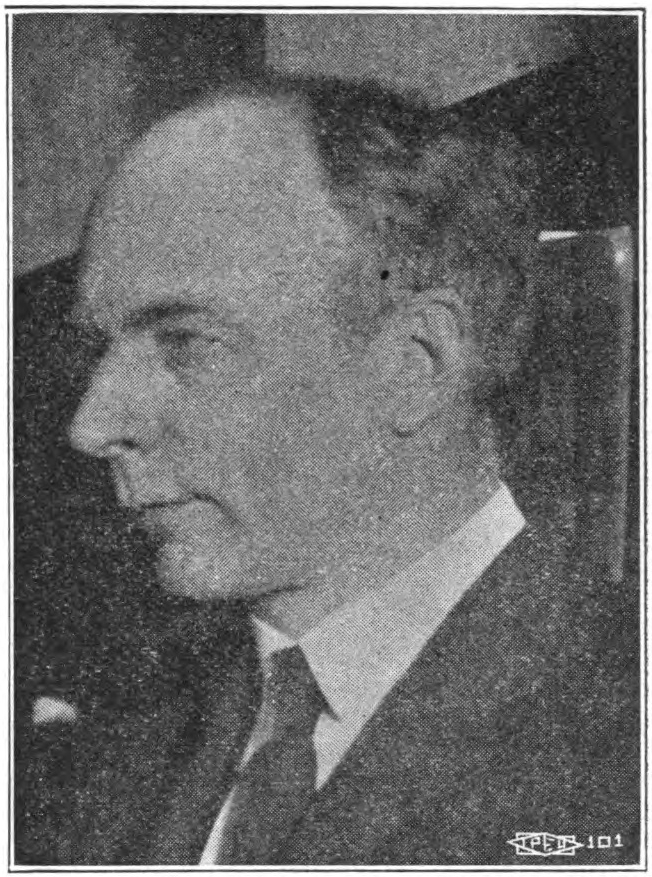
Ruthenberg c. 1923

Wagenknecht headed this new joint organization with Ruthenberg placed in charge of the party press. This still left a divided Communist movement, however, with the major part of the old CPA, now headed by Charles Dirba still remaining in increasingly bitter opposition. It was not until the end of 1922 — after another merger, split, and merger — that this rift was finally resolved, with the establishment with a new unified Communist Party of America and its parallel "Legal Political Party," the Workers Party of America (WPA).

During much of this complicated dance, Ruthenberg was in jail. In October 1920, he was tried together with his associate Isaac Ferguson in New York for alleged violation of the state's criminal anarchism law, said to have been breached by the Left Wing Section when it published Fraina's Left Wing Manifesto the previous year. The pair were tried and sentenced to five years' confinement in the State Penitentiary on October 29, 1920. The pair sat in Dannemora Prison until finally released on a $5,000 bond on April 24, 1922. Ruthenberg was immediately made Executive Secretary of the WPA upon his release on bail, with Abram Jakira in charge of daily operations of the parallel and underground CPA.

The above-ground WPA headed by Ruthenberg grew rapidly, boosted by the addition of the massive Finnish Federation to its ranks, while the underground party withered and died, put to bed for good in 1923. Thereafter he was the sole Executive Secretary of the American Communist Party (still calling itself the Workers Party of America) — a position which he retained for the rest of his life, despite spending much of the 1920s as a leader of a minority faction within the party.

The criminal anarchism convictions of Ruthenberg and Ferguson were ultimately overturned by the New York Supreme Court In July 1922, just in time for another round of prosecutions, this time related to ill-fate August 1922 Unity Convention of the CPA held at Bridgman, Michigan.

=== 1922 Bridgman Convention and its aftermath ===
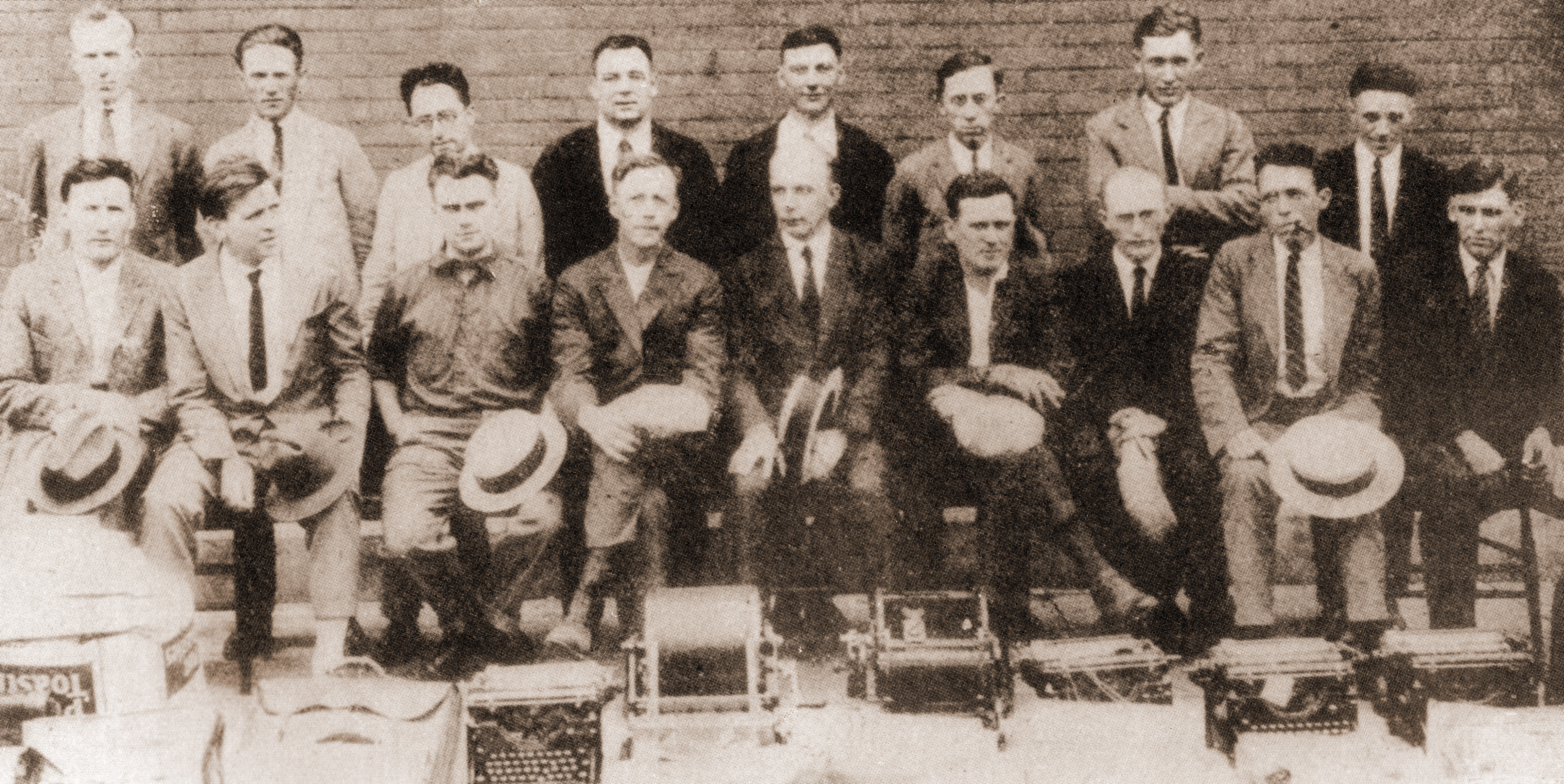
Some of those arrested in the 1922 Bridgman raid. Back row, L-R: T.J. O'Flaherty, Charles Erickson, Cyril Lambkin, Bill Dunne, John Mihelic, Alex Bail, W.E. "Bud" Reynolds, "Francis Ashworth." Seated L-R: Norman Tallentire, Caleb Harrison, Eugene Bechtold, Seth Nordling, C. E. Ruthenberg, Charles Krumbein, Max Lerner, T.R. Sullivan, Elmer McMillan.

A secret conclave had been arranged at the Wolfskeel Resort on the wooded shore of Lake Michigan to finally unite the CPA with a parallel organization maintained by its dissident Central Caucus faction. The site was regarded as relatively safe, having previously been used for a secret convention of the United Communist Party in the spring of 1920. This time, however, an informant of the US Department of Justice had managed to win election to the gathering as a delegate and the authorities had been notified.

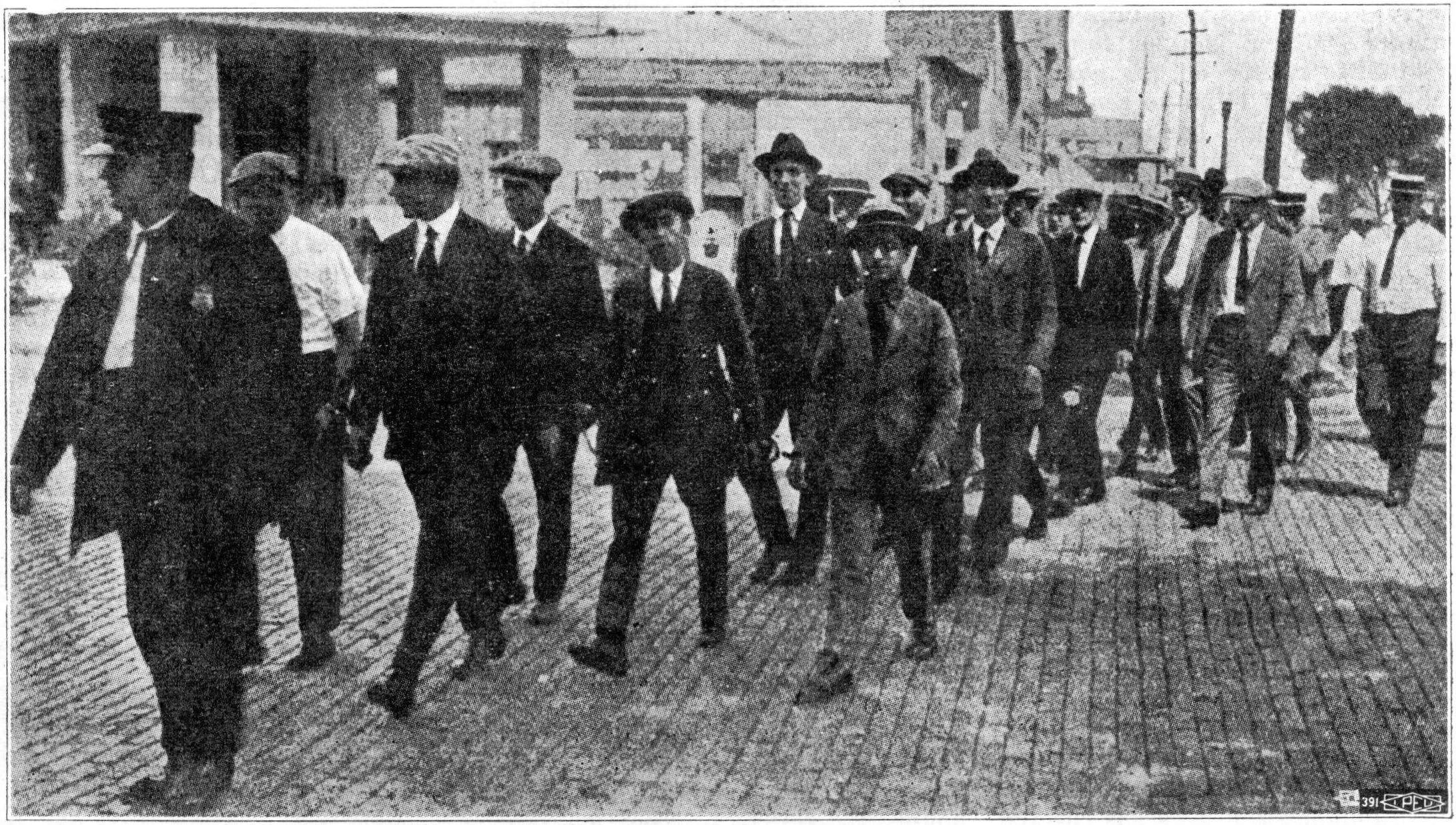
"Manacled Communist prisoners being marched thru streets of Benton Harbor, Michigan. Ruthenberg in front, shackled to Charles Krumbein." 1922.

The forced merger did not, however, end the rivalries between the two groups. Ruthenberg and his supporter Jay Lovestone were at odds with a rival faction led by William Z. Foster, who had strong ties to organized labor and who wanted to direct the party's work toward organizing within the American-born working class, and James P. Cannon, who led the International Labor Defense organization.

Ruthenberg ran unsuccessfully for a seat in the U.S. House of Representatives from Ohio's 20th congressional district (now abolished) as the candidate of the Workers Party of America, as the CPUSA's legal organization was then known, on his return to the United States.

In 1925, Comintern representative Sergei Gusev ordered the majority Foster faction to surrender control to Ruthenberg's faction; Foster complied. The factional infighting within the CPUSA did not end, however; the communist leadership of the New York locals of the International Ladies' Garment Workers' Union lost the 1926 strike of cloakmakers in New York City in large part because of intra-party factional rivalries, as neither group wanted to take the responsibility for accepting a strike settlement that appeared insufficiently revolutionary.

In 1926–27 his First Amendment case, Ruthenberg v. Michigan, was pending in the U.S. Supreme Court. The Court had voted 7–2 (with Brandeis joined by Holmes dissenting) against Ruthenberg. But Ruthenberg died shortly before the Court rendered its ruling, rendering the case moot; thus the opinions in the case were never published. It has been argued that Brandeis' adapted his unpublished opinion in Ruthenberg into his famous defense of free speech found in the 1927 case Whitney v. California.

== Personal life and death ==
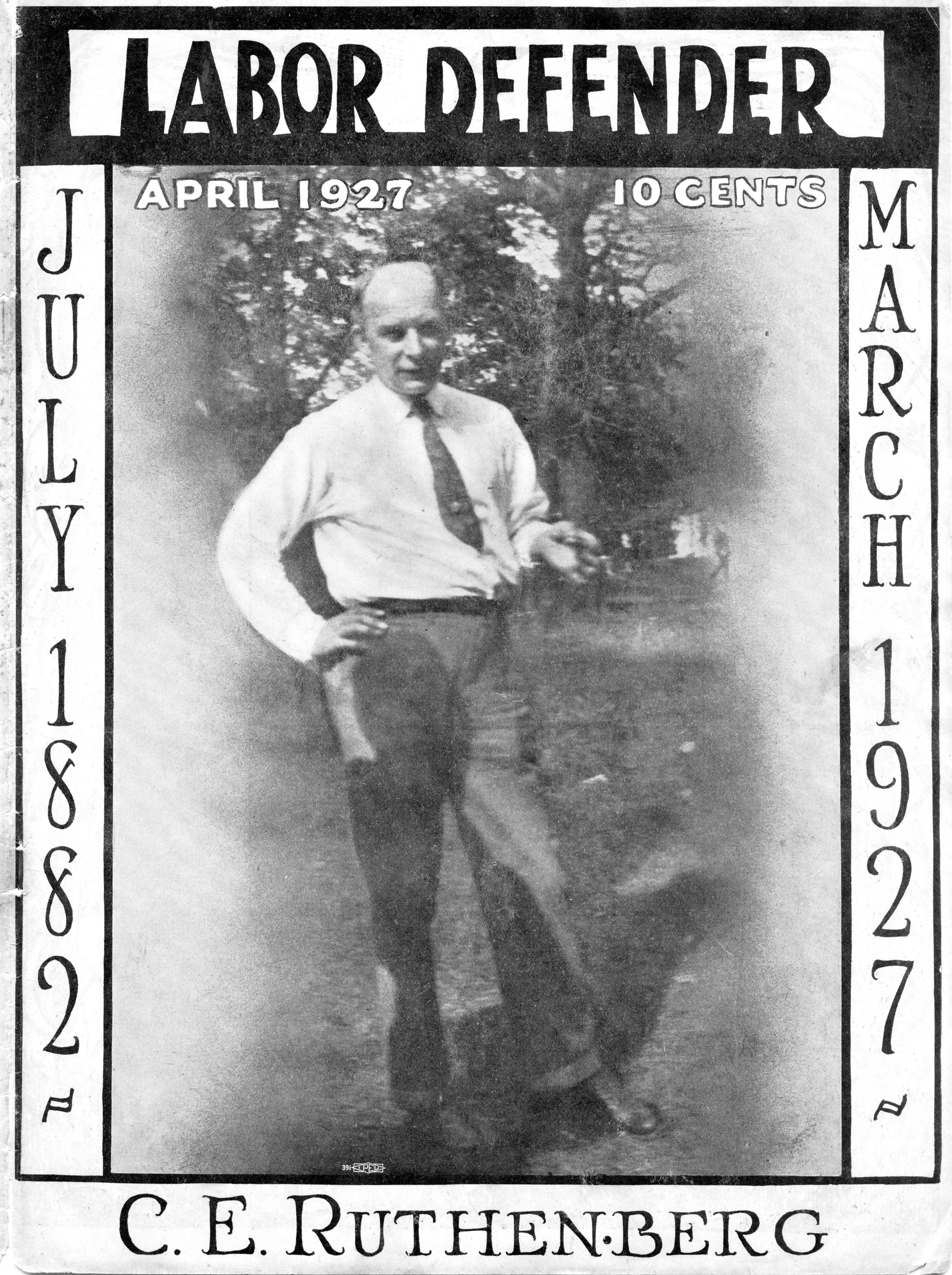
The cover of Labor Defender following Ruthenberg's death, April 1927

Ruthenberg married Rosaline "Rose" Nickel, also of German descent, in June 1904. In 1905 the couple had a son named Daniel, their only child.

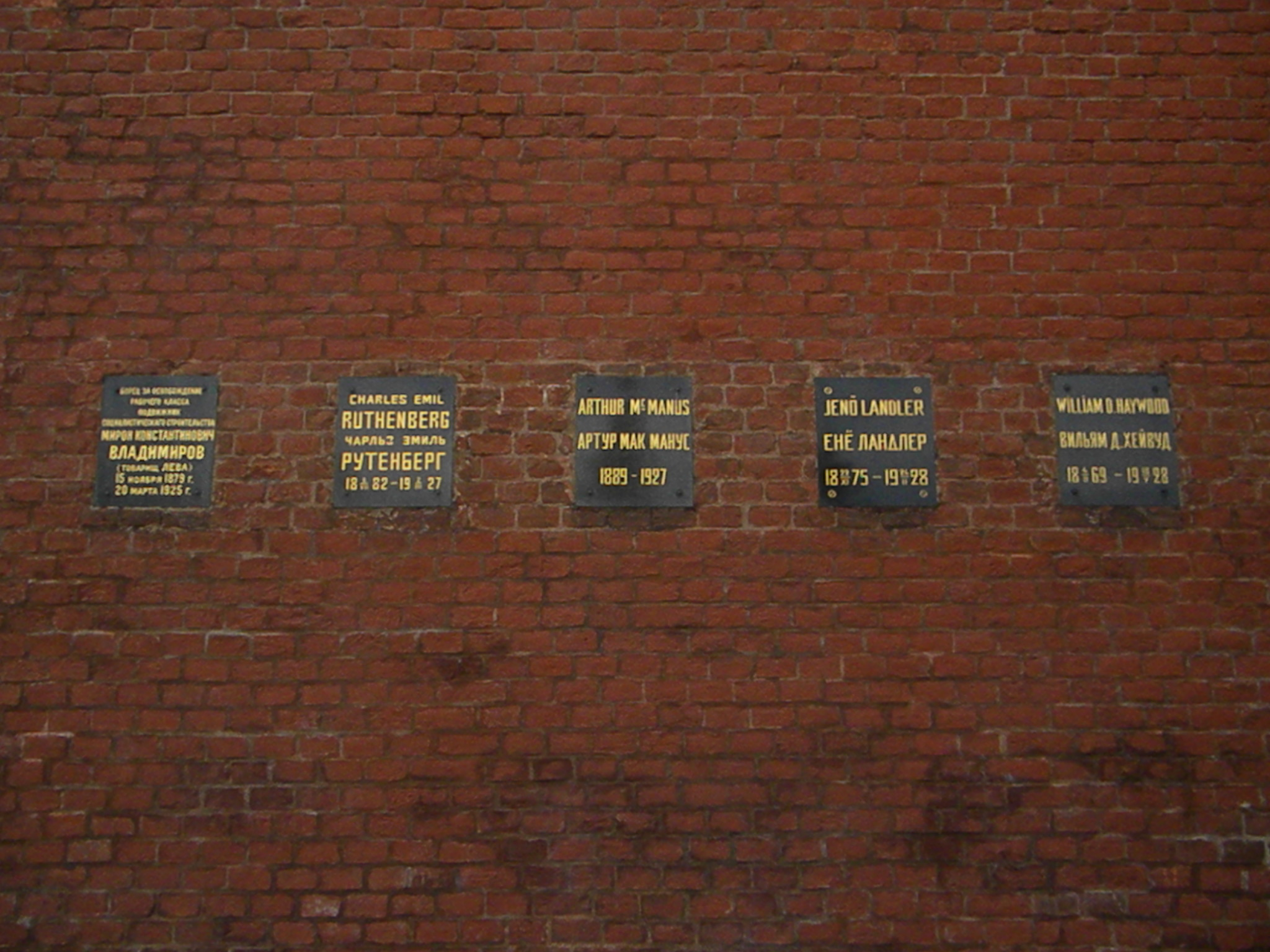
Ruthenberg's plaque (second from left) on the Kremlin Wall Necropolis

Ruthenberg died on March 1, 1927, in Chicago after undergoing surgery for acute peritonitis. He was cremated and an urn containing his ashes was transported to Moscow and carried in an April 26 Comintern funeral procession where it was placed in the Kremlin Wall Necropolis, not far from the burial place of his former factional rival John Reed.

== Works ==
As the head of the American Communist Party, Ruthenberg was essentially an administrator rather than a theoretician. His early journalism is scattered, he wrote relatively few pamphlets, and he published no books in his lifetime, save for a slim volume gathering his 1920 New York trial testimony with that of Isaac Ferguson, who also served as attorney in his case. A small volume of excerpts of speeches was also published by the Communist Party in 1928, shortly after his death. Nor has the CPUSA, despite Ruthenberg's iconic status in party history, published any significant portion of his work in subsequent years. This paucity of available material has been mitigated to some extent in the internet age, with an appreciable slice of his journalism gradually becoming available online. Much of his writing can be found on the Marxists Internet Archive.

=== Books and pamphlets ===
- Are We Growing Toward Socialism? Cleveland: Local Cleveland, Socialist Party, Spring 1917.
- Guilty? Of what?: Speeches Before the Jury in Connection with the Trial of C. E. Ruthenberg, Alfred Wagenknecht, Charles Baker. (1917).
- After the War — What? December 1918. —Pamphlet edition lost, recovered from first publication as article series.
- A Communist Trial: Extracts from the Testimony of C. E. Ruthenberg and Closing Address to the Jury by Isaac E. Ferguson (1920).
- The Bridgman Trial. Late 1923. —Ruthenberg and Foster trial speeches. Oakley Johnson claims entire edition confiscated or lost.
- The Farmer-Labor United Front (1924).
- Why Every Worker Should Be a Communist and Join the Workers Party by Charles E. Ruthenberg Chicago, Ill. : Workers Party of America, 1923
- From the Third Through the Fourth Convention of the Workers (Communist) Party of America (1925).
- The Workers (Communist) Party: What It Stands For, Why Workers Should Join (1925).
- Voices of Revolt: Charles E. Ruthenberg. Vol. 10 of the "Voices of Revolt" series. New York: International Publishers, 1928.
- Ruthenberg, Communist Fighter and Leader. Introduction by Jay Lovestone New York: Workers Library Publishers, 1928.

=== Articles and leaflets ===
- "You Will Pay in Blood and Suffering," April 1, 1917. —Anti-war leaflet.
- "This is Not a War for Freedom," May 27, 1917. —Anti-war speech.
- "Greeting to the October Revolution," November 1917. —Leaflet.
- "On the Threshold of the New World," Socialist News [Cleveland], April 27, 1918.
- "Forward, March!" January 1919. —Leaflet.
- "The Bolshevists: Grave-Diggers of Capitalism," Ohio Socialist [Cleveland], whole no. 53 (Jan. 29, 1919), pg. 4.
- "The Bankruptcy of Democracy," Socialist News [Cleveland], February 1, 1919.
- "Who Are the Murderers?" May 1919. —Leaflet.
- "The Communist Party and Its Tasks," The Communist [New York], July 1921.
- "The Need for Open Work," The Communist [New York], August 1921.
- "Communism in the Open Again," The Liberator [New York], February 1923.
- "An Open Challenge," The Liberator [New York], March 1923.
- "The Second Round at St. Joseph," Labor Herald [Chicago], vol. 2, no. 4 (June 1923), pp. 7–8, 32.
- "Role of the Workers Party," The Liberator [New York], July 1923.
- "The Revolutionary Party," The Liberator [New York], January 1924.
- "Progressive, But Not Labor," Workers Monthly [Chicago], vol. 4, no. 1 (November 1924), pp. 21–23, 31.
- "Is the Movement Toward Class Political Action Dead?" Workers Monthly [Chicago], vol. 4, no. 2 (December 1924), pp. 77–79.
- "The Session of the Enlarged Executive Committee of the Communist International," Workers Monthly [Chicago], vol. 5, no. 8 (June 1926), pp. 339–342, 373.
- "The Tasks of the party in the Light of the Comintern," Workers Monthly [Chicago], vol. 5, no. 9 (July 1926), pp. 401–405.
- "Capitalism Mobilizes Against the Workers," Workers Monthly [Chicago], vol. 5, no. 1 (September 1926), pp. 5–9.
- "Seven Years of the Communist Party," Workers Monthly [Chicago], September 1926.
- "Socialist Party Fights Unity of Action of Workers," Daily Worker, vol. 3, no. 207 (September 15, 1926), pg. 6.
- "What Is the Election About?" Workers Monthly [Chicago], vol. 5, no. 13 (November 1926), pp. 579–581.
- "Eugene V. Debs and the Revolutionary Labor Movement," Daily Worker, vol. 3, no. 252 (November 6, 1926), pg. 6.
- "Two Supreme Court Decisions," Daily Worker, vol. 3, no. ? (November 9, 1929), pp. ?,
- "Many Opportunities for Building the Revolutionary Movement," Daily Worker, vol. 3, no. 269 (November 27, 1926), pg. 6.
- "The Achievements of the Party," Daily Worker, vol. 3, no. 270 (November 28, 1926), pg. 6.
- "Organization of the Unorganized and Work in the Trade Unions," Daily Worker, vol. 3, no. 271 (November 30, 1926), pg. 6.
- "The Campaign for the Labor Party," Daily Worker, vol. 3, no. 272 (December 1, 1926), pg. 6.
- "Reorganization of the Workers (Communist) Party," Daily Worker, vol. 3, no. 274 (December 3, 1926), pg. 6.
- "First Signs of a Downward Trend in Industry," Daily Worker, vol. 3, no. ? (February 5, 1927), pp. ?.
