= Abram Jakira =

American socialist activist

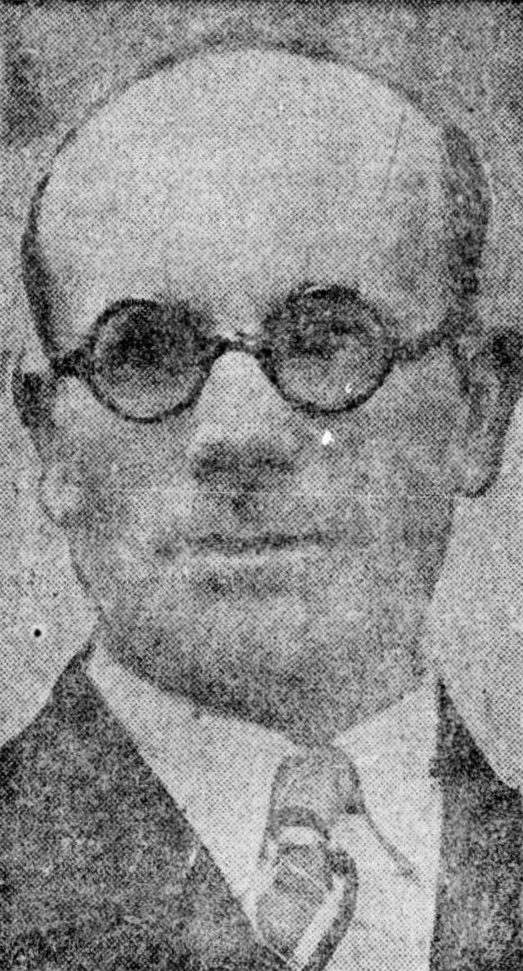
Jakira c. 1931

Abraham "Abram" Jakira (c. 1889–1931) was an American socialist political activist, newspaper editor, and Communist Party functionary. He is best remembered as one of the early Communist Party's factional leaders of the 1920s.

== Biography ==
=== Early years ===
Abram Jakira is believed to have been born in the Russian Empire around 1889. Little is known of his life prior to his coming to the United States in 1912.

=== Political career ===
Jakira was an active member of the Socialist Party of America and was supportive of the Left Wing Section of the Socialist Party which emerged in 1919. Later that year he became a founding member of the Communist Labor Party of America (CLP) and served as the Secretary of that organization's Russian-language federation. He served as a member of the editorial board of the CLP, in charge of production of the party's Russian-language "underground" (secret and illegal) newspaper and pamphlets.

Jakira moved with the rest of the CLP into the new United Communist Party of America (UCP) in May 1920. He was one of six members of that organization who prepared the UCP's program. In the summer of 1920, Jakira was named the organizer of the UCP's Russian Federation. During this period he used the pseudonym "A. Dubner." He also later used the pseudonyms "A. Duboff," "Post," and "J. Miller" among other names.

On April 29, 1920, the U.S. Department of Justice and the so-called "bomb squad" of the New York City Police Department conducted a raid on an apartment which proved to be the national headquarters of the United Communist Party. Jakira was one of those arrested in the sensational raid. He was held and released on $5,000 bail in May 1921.

Jakira briefly served on the governing Central Executive Committee of the UCP in June 1921, resigning due to "family matters" resulting from his need to regularly commute from Philadelphia to party headquarters in New York City.

The United Communist Party and the old Communist Party of America united in the summer of 1921 to form a new, unified organization also called the Communist Party of America. In this organization Jakira was one of the primaries in the so-called "Goose Caucus" group which, seeing open operations in the face of law enforcement pressure as potentially disastrous, advocated continuation of the secret form of organization then being employed by the party.

Jakira was elected Executive Secretary of the CPA at the ill-fated August 1922 Bridgman Convention of the CPA, while also sitting on the governing Central Executive Committee of the party's "legal" and aboveground arm, the Workers Party of America (WPA). In the six month interval which followed, the secret organization's size and influence withered, while the WPA, fueled particularly by an influx of new blood from the Finnish Socialist Federation, grew dramatically. Early in 1923 the decision was made to terminate the parallel underground organization which Jakira headed, leaving the "legal" WPA headed by C.E. Ruthenberg as the sole communist organization in the field.

Called by one of his contemporaries "modest and friendly," Jakira was a factional loyalist to Workers (Communist) Party leaders Ruthenberg and Jay Lovestone in the middle 1920s. In January 1924, Jakira was appointed the District Organizer of the WPA's Philadelphia district. He remained in that post for at least a year before taking on a similar role in Western Pennsylvania as DO of the Pittsburgh district, a position which he retained through the end of the decade.

Late in the spring of 1929 Communist Party Executive Secretary Jay Lovestone was deposed by the decision of the Executive Committee of the Communist International, which aimed to end the ongoing factional war in the American part. Jakira was among the first four of the Communist Party's district organizers to publicly endorse this decision.

Jakira was the Communist Party's District Organizer for the Pittsburgh district in 1928 and was influential in helping to organize the National Miners Union, a radical "dual union" established by the party through its Trade Union Unity League arm late in that year.

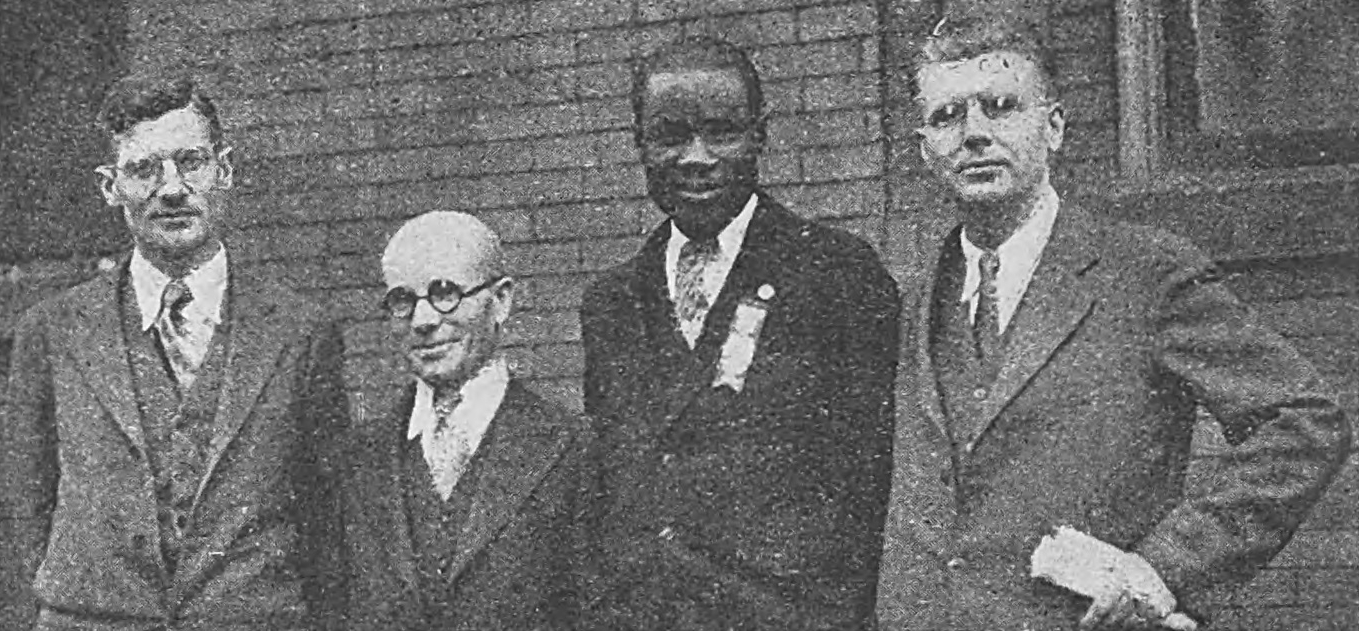
Jakira (second from left) at the Fourth National Conference of the International Labor Defense, 1930

Thereafter, Jakira was named Assistant Secretary of the International Labor Defense, a mass organization initiated, financed, and controlled by the Communist Party.

=== Death and legacy ===
Abram Jakira died of throat cancer on March 20, 1931, in Harlem.

== Works ==
- "Pittsburgh District Puts into Motion Plan for Recruiting of New Members and More Activity," The Daily Worker, vol. 3, no. 254 (November 9, 1926), pg. 4.
