= 1922 Bridgman Convention =

Secret meeting of the underground Communist Party of America

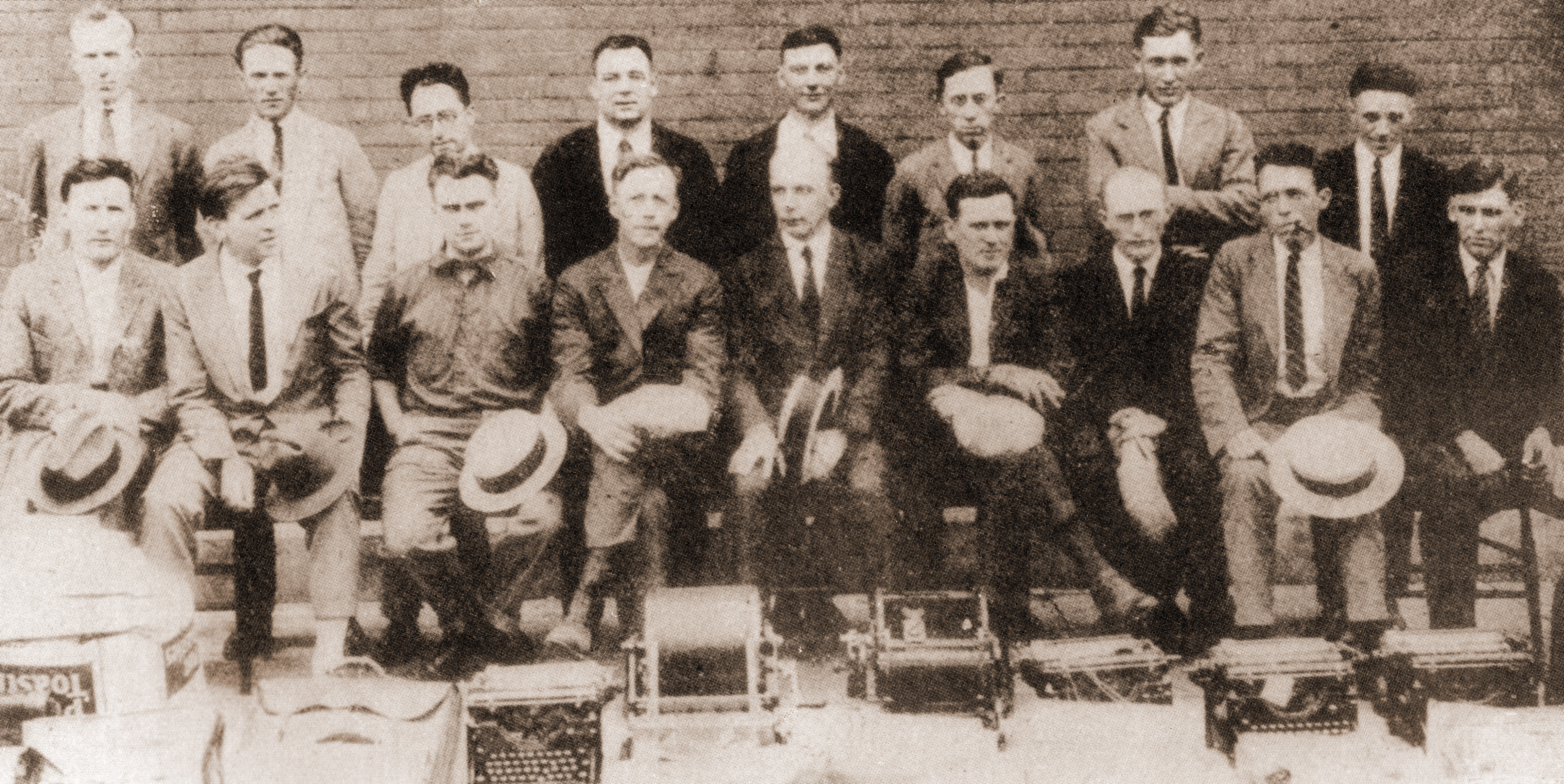
Some of those arrested in the 1922 Bridgman raid. Back row, L-R: T.J. O'Flaherty, Charles Erickson, Cyril Lambkin, Bill Dunne, John Mihelic, Alex Bail, W.E. "Bud" Reynolds, "Francis Ashworth." Seated L-R: Norman Tallentire, Caleb Harrison, Eugene Bechtold, Seth Nordling, C. E. Ruthenberg, Charles Krumbein, Max Lerner, T.R. Sullivan, Elmer McMillan.

The 1922 Bridgman Convention was a secret conclave of the underground Communist Party of America (CPA) held in August 1922 near the small town of Bridgman, Michigan, about 90 miles (140 km) outside of the city of Chicago on the banks of Lake Michigan. The convention, called by the CPA as its annual gathering for the election of officers and making of internal decisions, was attended by a delegate who was secretly an employee of the Bureau of Investigation (Jacob Spolansky), who informed his superiors of the date and general location of the gathering. The convention was raided by local and federal law enforcement authorities on August 22, 1922, and a number of participants and a large quantity of documents seized in an operation which garnered national headlines. Two 1923 test trials of the Michigan criminal syndicalism law resulted from the arrests, with trade union leader William Z. Foster freed by a "hung jury," while Communist Party leader C. E. Ruthenberg was convicted. Ruthenberg ultimately died of peritonitis in 1927, just after his appeals were exhausted and just before sentence was enforced. No additional trials associated with the 1922 Bridgman raid were conducted.

== History ==
=== The 1921 Central Caucus split ===
In the fall of 1921, a section of the Communist Party of America identifying themselves as a "Central Caucus," headed by Executive Secretary Charles Dirba and including Central Executive Committee members John J. Ballam and George Ashkenuzi, split from the CPA to form their own parallel organization. At issue was the decision of the CEC majority to hurriedly establish a parallel Workers Party of America (WPA), the "above-ground" and "legal" nature of which was believed to risk exposing the organization's largely immigrant membership to easy arrest and deportation. The split came after a mere eight months of tenuous unity between Dirba and his associates with the members of the former Communist Labor Party (CLP).

Dirba's "Central Caucus" group formally organized themselves as a competing organization, also known as the "Communist Party of America," at a convention held early in January 1922. This gathering, attended by 38 delegates, purported to represent 5,000 party members, fully half of the American communist movement at the time, 80 percent of whom hailed from various language federations of the old CPA. The Central Caucus faction objected to the establishment of a public Workers Party of America (WPA) to which all underground party members were required to belong. In addition to security concerns over the WPA, the radical Central Caucus group objected to the WPA's emphasis upon elections, considering this a turn away from the strategy of forcible overthrow of the bourgeoisie through revolution and the establishment of the dictatorship of the proletariat in accord with the Soviet model.

This new split of the American communist movement was vexing to the Communist International, which insisted upon one unified communist party in each country and which had struggled to unite its American factions ever since the formation of parallel organizations in September 1919. Although the Central Caucus actively campaigned with the Comintern on behalf of its position, going so far as to dispatch John Ballam to Moscow, the Comintern ruled against those participating in the new split and ordered them back into the "regular" CPA. The Comintern ultimatum declared that "All members that do not comply with the [unity] instructions within two months from the time they sent out by the CEC of the CP of A stand outside of the CP of A and therefore also out of the Comintern."

A convention was called for August 1922 to formally reintegrate the Central Caucus faction dissidents into the "regular" CPA and well as to decide upon various programmatic initiatives, such as the proposed dissolution of the underground organization in favor of the much more successful WPA. The dates of August 17–23, 1922, were set for the gathering, which was to be held at the Wolfskeel resort at Bridgman, Michigan, site of a 1920 convention of the United Communist Party of America which had gone off in secret without complications.

=== Unity Convention at Bridgman ===
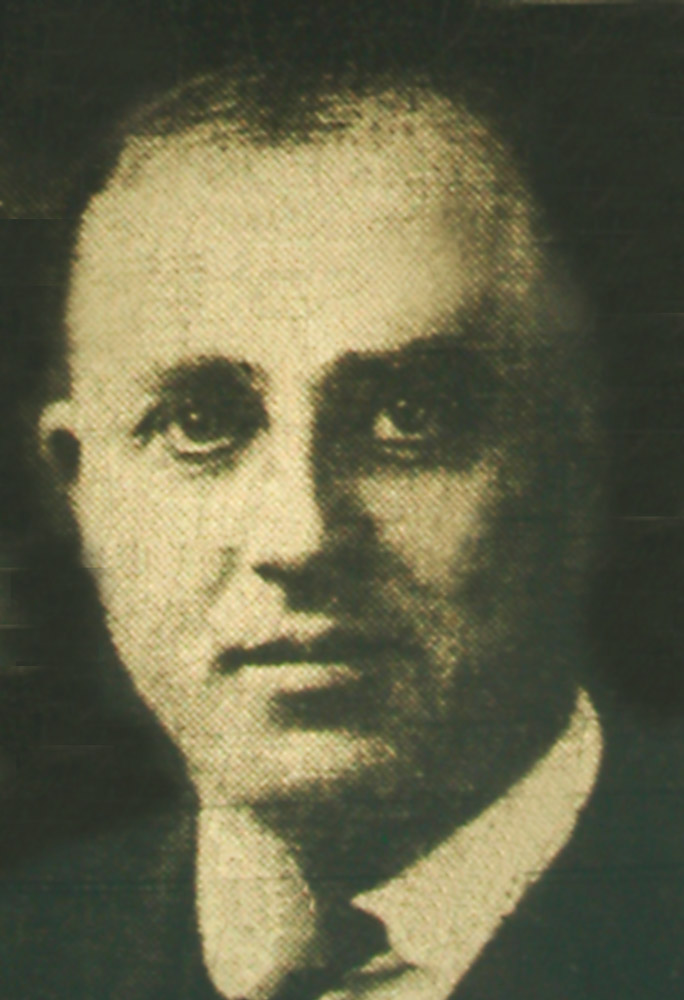
Berrien County Sheriff George Bridgman, leader of the August 22nd raid.

=== The raid ===
William J. Burns, the Director of the Bureau of Investigation, alongside deputy director J. Edgar Hoover, orchestrated the raid in the Summer of 1922. After a "mad dash through the woods", BOI agents apprehended large quantities of manifestos, membership lists, and evidence of direct communication with Moscow, alongside some two dozen party officials.

General area of the 1922 Bridgman Convention as it appeared in 2005.

=== Legal aftermath ===
Prosecution based on the captured evidence was largely a failure. In the trial of trade union leader William Z. Foster, an undercover operative testified that Burns had instructed him to lie so as to frame Foster as a "dangerous subversive"; the trial resulted in a hung jury.

== See also ==
- National conventions of the Communist Party USA
- Communist Party USA
