= Charles Krumbein =

American Communist leader

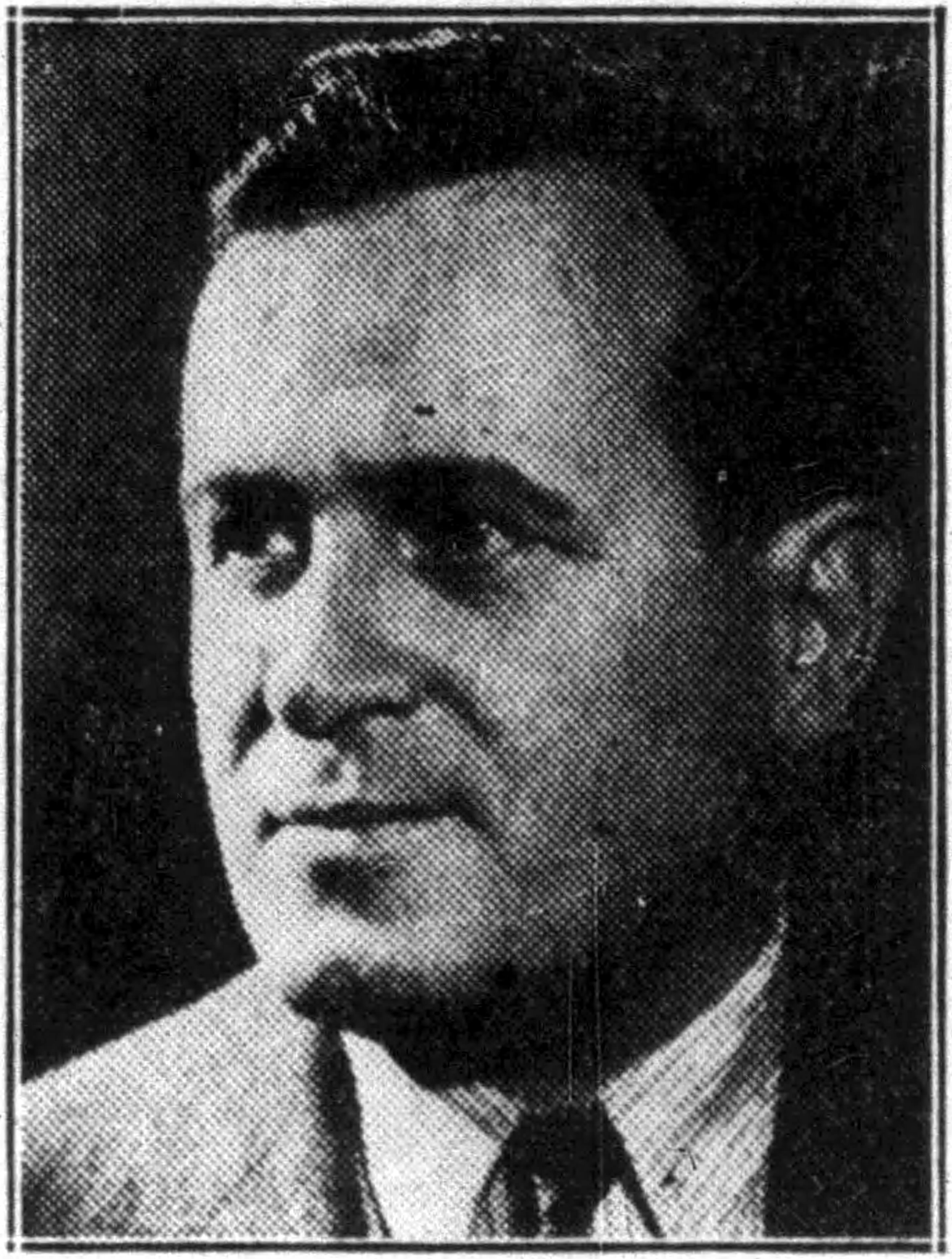
Krumbein c. 1938

Charles Krumbein (February 10, 1889 – January 20, 1947) was an American Communist activist.

== Biography ==
Krumbein initially joined the Socialist Party. He left the SP in 1919 and became a founding member of the Communist Labor Party.

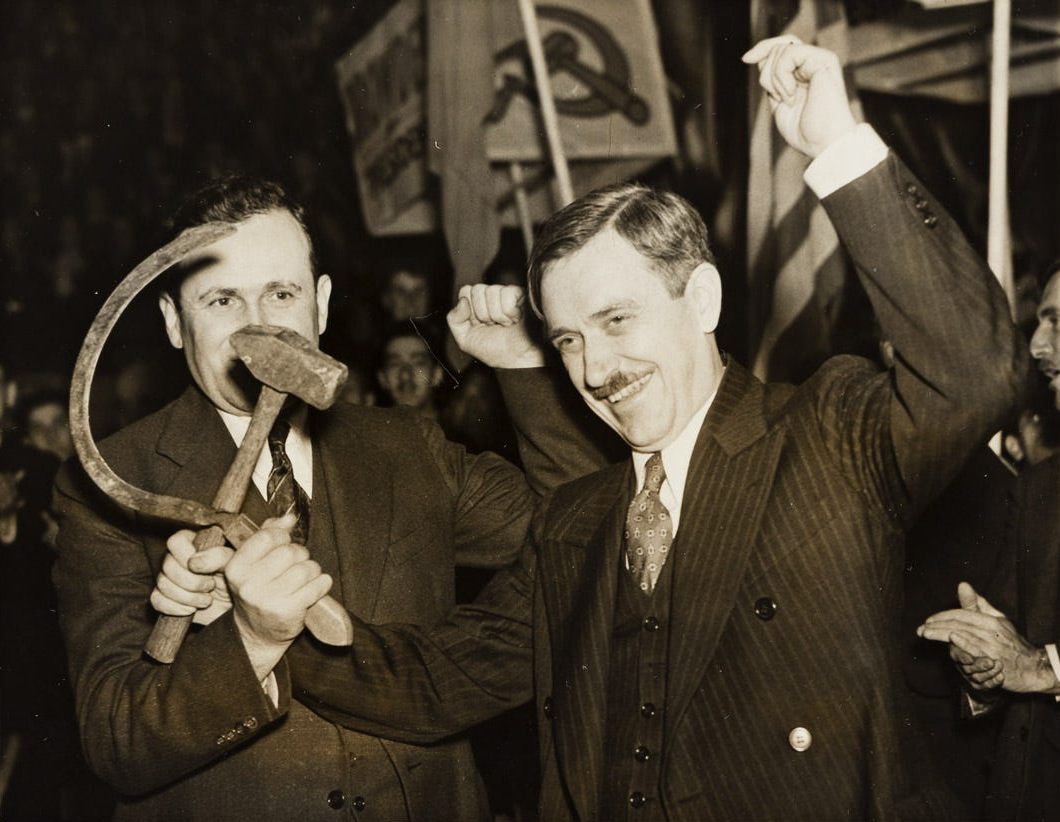
Earl Browder, right, crosses a hammer with a sickle held by Krumbein as they stand before a crowd gathered for the final rally of the presidential campaign at Madison Square Garden, November 2, 1936

Krumbein was a delegate to the 1922 Bridgman Convention of the Communist Party of America. He was arrested with 17 other Party members but was later pardoned by Illinois Governor Len Small. Krumbein was one of seven Americans invited to study at the International Lenin School in May 1926. In January 1935, Krumbein plead guilty to the charge of having traveled with a false passport in 1930, and received an eighteen month sentence at Lewisburg Penitentiary. Despite their political differences, Socialist Party leader Norman Thomas wrote a letter to Roosevelt asking for clemency for Krumbein, describing him as "a man of character and devotion to his cause". Krumbein was elected to serve as the national treasurer for the Communist Party at their convention on May 22, 1943.

Krumbein was married to fellow Communist Party activist Margaret Cowl. He died of a heart attack on January 20, 1947, while on vacation in Miami Beach.
