= Max Lerner =

American journalist and educator (1902–1992)

Lerner in 1969

Max Lerner (December 20, 1902 – June 5, 1992) was a Russia-born American journalist and educator known for his syndicated column.

== Background ==
Maxwell Alan Lerner was born on December 20, 1902, in Minsk, then in the Russian Empire, the son of Bessie (née Podel) and Benjamin Lerner. His Russian-Jewish family emigrated to the United States in 1907, where his father sold milk door to door. Lerner earned a B.A. from Yale University in 1923. He briefly studied law there before enrolling at Washington University in St. Louis, where he received an M.A. in 1925. He earned a Ph.D. from the Washington, D.C.–based Robert Brookings Graduate School of Economics and Government (a progenitor of the Brookings Institution think tank that was academically affiliated with Washington University) in 1927.

== Career ==
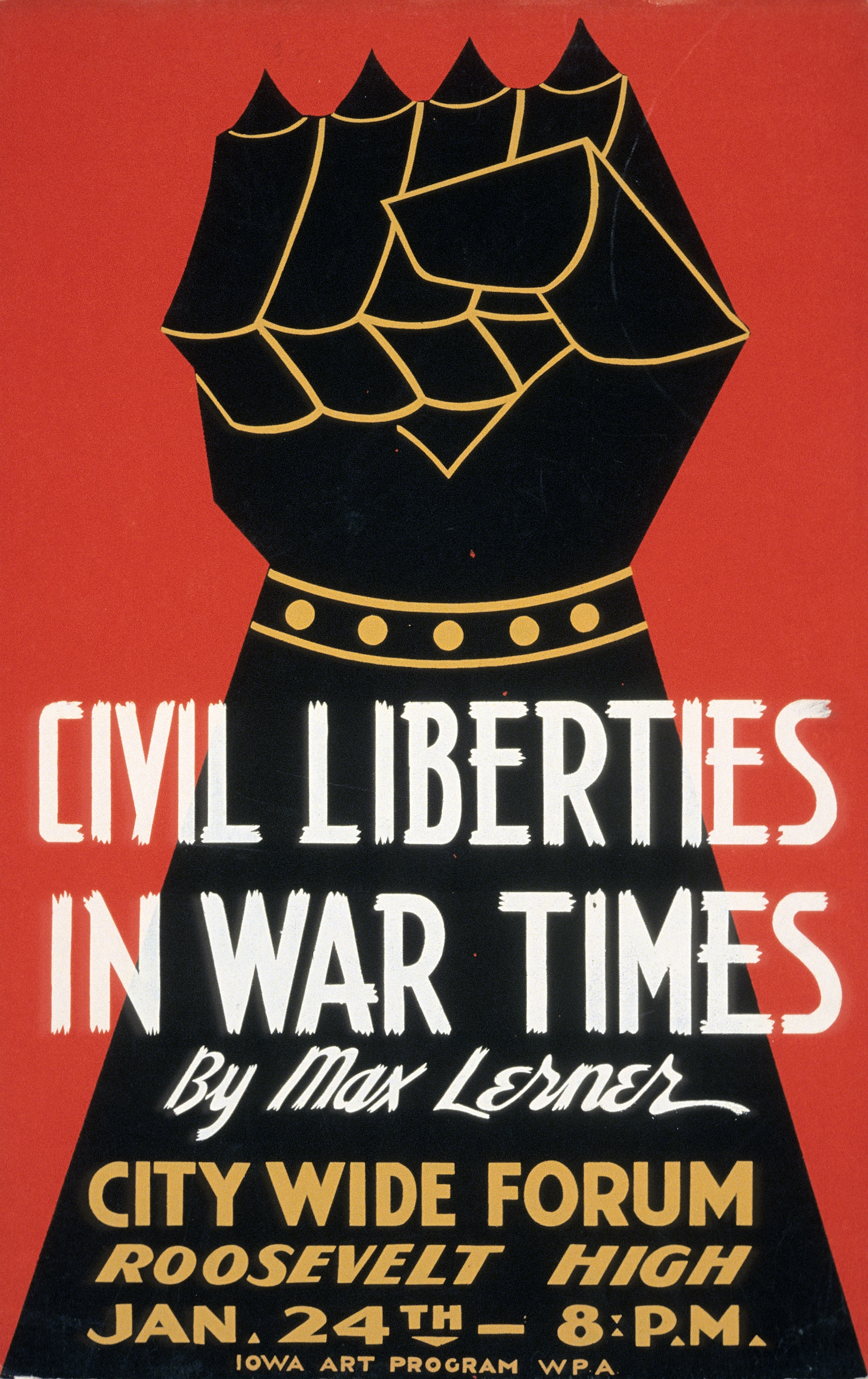
Poster for a lecture by Max Lerner in Des Moines, Iowa, 1940

After receiving his doctorate, Lerner began work as an editor for the Encyclopaedia of the Social Sciences (1927–1932), The Nation (1936–1938), and PM (1943–1948). Following the sale of PM, he continued as a contributor to its short-lived successor, the New York Star, until its dissolution in 1949.

His column for the New York Post debuted in 1949. It earned him a place on the master list of Nixon political opponents. During most of his career he was considered a liberal. In his later years, however, he was seen as something of a conservative since he expressed support for Margaret Thatcher and the Reagan administration.

He taught at Sarah Lawrence College, Harvard University, Williams College, United States International University, the University of Notre Dame, and Brandeis University. Lerner also was a close friend of film star Elizabeth Taylor during her marriage to Eddie Fisher.

== Personal life and death ==
Lerner was a strong advocate of the New Deal.

Lerner was a staunch opponent of discrimination against African Americans but supported the wartime Japanese American internment and backed an American Civil Liberties Union resolution on the issue to "subordinate civil liberties to wartime considerations and political loyalties."

Lerner married Anita Marburg in 1928, and they divorced in 1940. He married Edna Albers in 1941. Lerner died on June 5, 1992.

Lerner's granddaughter is actress Betsy Russell.

== Works ==
Lerner's most influential book was America as a Civilization: Life and Thought in the United States Today (1957).

His book The Unfinished Country is a collection of more than 200 of his daily columns, which were written for the New York Post over the span of more than a decade. The book contains one of his better-known quotes: "The turning point in the process of growing up is when you discover the core of strength within you that survives all hurt." His 1990 book, Wrestling with the Angel, was about his long struggle with illness.

=== Bibliography ===
Books

- Public Journal: Marginal Notes on Wartime America (1945)
- America as a Civilization: Life and Thought in the United States Today (1957)
  - Volume 1: The Basic Frame
  - Volume 2: Culture and Personality
- Values in Education: Notes Toward a Values Philosophy (1976)
- Ted and the Kennedy Legacy: A Study in Character and Destiny (1980)
- Wrestling with the Angel: A Memoir of My Triumph Over Illness (1990) (memoir)

Undated books

- The Unfinished Country: A Book of American Symbols (collection of essays and editorials)
- Wounded Titans: American Presidents and the Perils of Power
- It Is Later Than You Think: The Need for a Militant Democracy
- Nine Scorpions in a Bottle: Great Judges and Cases of the Supreme Court
- Ideas Are Weapons: The History and Uses of Ideas
- Magisterial Imagination: Six Masters of the Human Science
- Third World: Premises of U.S. Policy
- Ideas for the Ice Age: Studies in a Revolutionary Era
- Actions and Passions: Notes on the Multiple Revolutions of Our Time
- "Education and a Radical Humanism: Notes Toward a Theory of the Educational Crisis" (with E.I.F. Williams)
- Civil Liberties in War Times

Edited works

- Encyclopaedia of the Social Sciences (1927–1932)
- The Nation (1936–1938)
- PM (1943–1948)
- Tocqueville and American Civilization
- Thomas Jefferson: America's Philosopher-King
- The Mind and Faith of Justice Holmes: His Speeches, Essays, Letters, and Judicial Opinions
- Essential Works of John Stuart Mill
- The Portable Veblen

Forewords and introductions

- The Wealth of Nations by Adam Smith (New York: Random House, 1937)
- The Prince and The Discourses by Niccolò Machiavelli (New York: Random House, 1950)
- Pioneer's Progress by Alvin Johnson (New York: The Viking Press. 1952)
- Values of Veblen, a critical appraisal by Bernard Rosenberg (Washington: Public Affairs Press, 1956)
- The Iron Heel by Jack London (New York: Sagamore Press. 1957)
- Americans for Democratic Action: its role in national politics by Clifton Brock (Washington: Public Affairs Press, 1962)
- Political science and political knowledge by Philip H. Melanson (Washington: Public Affairs Press, 1975)

== See also ==
- The Nation
- PM
- New York Star (1948–1949)

== External sources ==
- Max Lerner papers (MS 322). Manuscripts and Archives, Yale University Library.
- Romano, C. America the Philosophical (2012).
- Richard Severo, Max Lerner, Writer, 89, Is Dead; Humanist on Political Barricades, The New York Times, June 6, 1992
- A film clip "The Open Mind - An American Original . . . Revisited (1988)" is available for viewing at the Internet Archive
- Works by or about Max Lerner at the Internet Archive
