= David P. Berenberg =

American poet (1890–1974)

David P. Berenberg as he appeared in 1932.

David Paul Berenberg (March 17, 1890 – March 7, 1974) was an American socialist teacher, editor, and writer. He is best remembered as a founder and editor of The American Socialist Quarterly, the theoretical magazine of the Socialist Party of America (SPA) during the 1930s.

== Biography ==
=== Early years ===
David P. Berenberg was born March 17, 1890, in Brooklyn, New York, the son of Bernhard Berenberg, a real estate broker. Berenberg attended public schools in Brooklyn before going on to attend City College of New York, from which he graduated in 1912.

Upon graduation from City College, Berenberg was employed as a public school teacher, a vocation which he continued from 1913 until 1918, when he resigned his post under fire for his socialist political views. He was not relicensed as a teacher in New York state until 1923.

At the end of the 1920s, Berenberg went into partnership with a friend named Clifford Hall and purchased a college preparatory school in New York City called The Franklin School, an academy which specialized in helping to place Jewish boys from less-than-elite families into Ivy League colleges. The pair ran the school together until Hall's death in the late 1940s.

=== Political career ===
In 1918, Berenberg was named the manager of the correspondence department of the Socialist Party's Rand School of Social Science, which was in charge of conducting correspondence courses with adults around the country interested in taking courses in the social sciences. He remained in this position until 1921, working after that date as a teacher on site at the Rand School, conducting classes in English, History, and various topics related to Socialism. Berenberg remained an employee of the Rand School continuously until his firing early in 1936, an action resulting from Berenberg's factional affiliation in the rough and tumble internal Socialist Party politics of the day.

Berenberg was a candidate for public office on the Socialist Party ticket on a number of different occasions, running for office each year from 1918 through 1924, inclusive. In 1918 and again in 1923 he stood as a candidate for the New York State Assembly. In 1919 and again in 1921 he ran for New York City Council. In 1920 Berenberg ran for New York State Senate, while in 1922 and again in 1924 he ran for U.S. Congress.

A factional war swept the Socialist Party in 1919. The battle pitted an organized Left wing faction — headed by Alfred Wagenknecht, L.E. Katterfeld, C.E. Ruthenberg, Alexander Stoklitsky, and Nicholas Hourwich — against an equally organized faction of "Party Regulars" led by Executive Secretary Adolph Germer, James Oneal, and Julius Gerber, Berenberg found himself solidly in the latter camp. When well known Left Wing adherent John Reed launched a weekly newspaper called The New York Communist in April 1919, Berenberg was not long in launching a counter-voice, The New York Socialist. In The New York Socialist Berenberg allowed the Regulars to present their side in the factional debates.

This new rival proved to be too tempting a target for the sophomorish Reed to ignore. On May 17, The New York Socialist appeared as usual at the Rand School. It was not until several thousand issues had been distributed that it was discovered that the document being distributed was an exact replica of Berenberg's publication created by Reed and his partner in crime, Eadmonn MacAlpine. The parody issue prominently featured a speech purported to have been delivered by Louis Waldman, a prominent leader of the Regular faction on April Fool's Day. In this mock speech, Waldman was portrayed as attacking the Left Wing with the words:

So evident is their intention to disrupt the party that it has been necessary to expel all Left Wing branches and exclude the members from any vote on party affairs. If this is not disrupting the party, what is?

Following a series of suspensions and expulsions by the Socialist Party's governing National Executive Committee which tilted the playing field, the 1919 Emergency National Convention of the party resulted in a resounding victory for Germer, Oneal, and the Regulars. Outmaneuvered and split over tactics, the Left Wing exited the SPA to form not one, but two organizations — the Communist Party of America and the Communist Labor Party of America. The victory proved costly, however. The Socialist Party lost a large percentage of its membership in the factional war, the number of its dues-payers plummeting from more than 100,000 to barely a tenth of that number, and the organizationation entered into a decade of decline.

The Socialist Party began to rebound in the late 1920s, with an influx of young and energetic members entering the party under the inspiration of the party's presidential candidate, Norman Thomas and through the solid organizing efforts of new National Executive Secretary Clarence Senior.

January 1932 saw the launch of a new publication, the realization of David P. Berenberg's dream — The American Socialist Quarterly. The publication's debut issue noted that, while not an official publication, the ASQ was published by three members of the Socialist Party who believed that:

- the Marxian theories are the philosophic basis of the Socialist Movement;
- that Socialist activity should always be predicated on the class struggle;
- that by democratic methods, and not by methods of cabal and dictatorship will Socialism be attained;
- that work among the unions, that the industrial organization of labor, is of equal importance with political action;
- that political action is necessary...for the establishment of the Socialist Commonwealth;
- that the mere winning of votes and of office is meaningless...unless the Socialist objective is always before the movement;
- that the Socialist Party should not enter into fusions or coalitions with groups that do not accept the Socialist philosophy;
- that Russia is not sacrosanct; that the theories and the acts of the Soviet Republic are as properly subject to critical comment as are the theories and acts of other governments.

David Berenberg in his early seventies.

Such an orientation seems to have been broadly reflective of the views of others in the party and The American Socialist Quarterly, was named the official organ of the Socialist Party by the National Executive Committee in the fall of 1934.

Berenberg was a frequent contributor to The Socialist Call, the weekly newspaper established by the Left Wing opposition to the Old Guard in 1935. He launched a periodic column in this publication late in 1935 entitled "What Does It Mean?" making use of the pseudonym "David Paul."

=== Later years ===
Berenberg seems to have been discouraged from radical politics by the bitter factional struggle and series of splits which decimated the Socialist Party in 1936 and 1937. His last political pamphlet was published in 1934 and his name was removed from the masthead of The American Socialist Monthly effective with the May 1937 issue. He did contribute a book review to the successor to the ASM, a larger format publication called Socialist Review, as late as the January 1938 issue.

Berenberg ran The Franklin School in New York City until Clifford Hall's death at the end of the 1940s. Thereafter, Berenberg retired and moved to Long Island, where he stayed intellectually engaged by conducting literary book clubs.

His wife, Rose, died in 1970, at which time Berenberg moved to Pennsylvania to be near a daughter who lived there.

David P. Berenberg's died on March 7, 1974.

Berenberg's papers are housed at Cornell University in Ithaca, New York.

== Works ==
=== Books and pamphlets ===
- The City for the Workers: The Case against "Business Administration" in New York. New York: Rand School of Social Science, 1917.
- Socialism. New York: Rand School of Social Science, 1918.
- The Fundamentals of Socialism: Twelve Lessons. New York: Rand School of Social Science, 1919.
- The Letters of Glaucon and Sarai: And Other Poems. Northampton, MA: N. Fitts, 1924.
- The Kid: A Narrative Poem. New York: Macmillan, 1931.
- A Workers' World. New York: Rand School Press, 1932.
- Socialist Fundamentals. New York: Rand School Press, 1932.
- We the People. New York: Rand School Press, 1934.
- America at the Crossroads. New York: Rand School Press, 1934.
- Chants: And Two Poems by Maples Arce. Boston: J. Wheelwright, 1935.

=== Articles ===
- "Nationalism — A Cause of War," New York Call, vol. 10, no. 294 (Oct. 21, 1917), Sunday magazine section, pg. 6.
- "The Left Wing Manifesto," The New York Socialist, originally serialized in 4 parts, May 4 through June 4, 1919.
- "Why the Foreign Language Federations Were Suspended," The New York Socialist, vol. 1, no. 6 (June 11, 1919), pg. 5.
- "What of the Class Struggle?" American Socialist Quarterly, vol. 1, no. 1 (January 1932), pp. 7–15.
- "A Program for American Socialism," American Socialist Quarterly, vol. 1, no.4 (Autumn 1932), pp. 3–9.
- "Concerning Fusion," American Socialist Quarterly, vol. 2, no. 1 (Winter 1933), pp. 33–38.
- "The Influence of Marx," American Socialist Quarterly, vol. 2, no. 2 (Spring 1933), pp. 3–8.
- "Roosevelt," American Socialist Quarterly, vol. 2, no. 3 (Summer 1933), pp. 45–52.
- "Circuses — and a Little Bread," American Socialist Quarterly, vol. 3, no. 1 (Spring 1934), pp. 12–19.
- "Immediate Demands," American Socialist Quarterly, vol. 3, no. 2 (Summer 1934), pp. 29–36.
- "Socialism and War," American Socialist Quarterly,vol. 3, no. 3 (Autumn 1934), pp. 43–52.
- "The Bankruptcy of American Communism," American Socialist Quarterly,vol. 3, no. 4 (December 1934), pp. 38–50.
- "'Pie in the Sky': A Study of Current Utopian Notions," American Socialist Quarterly, vol. 4, no. 1 (March 1935), pp. 52–64. —on Townsend Plan, "Share the Wealth", Social Credit, Father Coughlin.
- "'Hep! Hep!'" The Socialist Call, vol. 1, no. 9 (May 18, 1935), pg. 7.
- "Anti-Nazi Jokes Flood Germany," The Socialist Call, vol. 1, no.10 (May 25, 1935), pg. 7.
- "Moving Toward Fascism," American Socialist Quarterly, vol. 4, no. 2 (June 1935), pp. 22–30.
- "Coughlin Fires a Dud," The Socialist Call, vol. 1, no.11 (June 1, 1935), pg. 7.
- "Each Stands in His Place," The Socialist Call, vol. 1, no.12 (June 7, 1935), pg. 7.
- "Change the Constitution!" The Socialist Call, vol. 1, no.13 (June 15, 1935), pg. 8.
- "Facts About New York and About the Nation," vol. 1, no.14 (June 22, 1935), pg. 8.
- "A Labor Party," American Socialist Quarterly, vol. 5, no. 3 (May 1936), pp. 2–6.
- "Ferment in Politics," American Socialist Quarterly, vol. 5, no. 6 (August 1936), pp. 2–6.
- "The Moscow Trial," American Socialist Monthly, vol. 5, no. 8 (December 1936), pp. 26–33.
- "Haim Kantorovitch: A Tribute," American Socialist Monthly, vol. 5, no. 8 (December 1936), pp. 39–40.
- "Honeymoon," American Socialist Monthly, vol. 5, no. 9 (February 1937), pp. 43–49.
- "Book Review: Two Pamphlets," American Socialist Monthly, vol. 5, no. 9 (February 1937), pp. 62–64. —on CP's Appeal to Communists; Paul Porter's Which Way for the Socialist Party?
- "Five to Four," American Socialist Monthly, vol. 6, no. 1 (May 1937), pp. 23–25.
- "The Roosevelt Honeymoon is Over," Socialist Review, vol. 6, no. 3 (October–November 1937), pp. 1–3.

=== Translation ===
- Julius Deutsch, The Civil War in Austria: A First-hand Account from Eyewitnesses and Participants. Chicago: Socialist Party, National Headquarters, 1934.
