= Left Wing Manifesto =

The Left Wing Manifesto is the name bestowed upon two distinct programmatic documents of the Left Wing Section of the Socialist Party during the factional war in the Socialist Party of America of 1919.

The first document, the "Left Wing Manifesto of the Left Wing Section of Local Greater New York" was the program over which the split of the Socialist Party of America into Left and Right factions was fought. It was created in January 1919.

The second document, the "Left Wing Manifesto of the Left Wing National Council", was a document produced at the end of June 1919, well after the factional battle lines had been hardened. This latter document was used as a pretext for prosecutions of several key radical leaders by the state of New York.

== "Left Wing Manifesto" issued by Left Wing Section, Local Greater New York ==
At the end of 1918, following the termination of American participation in World War I and in the wake of the party's poor showing in the November elections, a radical faction emerged in the Socialist Party of America. This group sought to transform the parliamentary SPA into a revolutionary socialist organization comparable to the Bolshevik organizations springing up across Europe.

In January 1919 a joint meeting of representatives of all the SP branches of Local Greater New York was called. The meeting was chaired by Julius Gerber, Executive Secretary of Local Greater New York who did his best to steer the meeting away from the passionate discussion of strategy and tactics which the Left Wing members so anxiously desired. When delegates from Queens attempted to win the floor at 11:30 pm, only to be ruled out of order, a number of radicals bolted the hall and gathered in a meeting room of their own. A City Committee of 14 was elected, with Max Cohen named as Executive Secretary. The group was to compose a manifesto and wage a campaign to win over the rank and file of the party to the ideas of revolutionary socialism. It was this group which wrote the famous Left Wing Manifesto, a document extensively revised by Louis C. Fraina, editor of the weekly newspaper of the Left Wing Section, Local Boston, The Revolutionary Age.

The document begins:

Prior to August, 1914, the nations of the world lived on a volcano. Violent eruptions from time to time gave warning of the cataclysm to come, but the diplomats and statesmen managed to localize the outbreaks, and the masses, slightly aroused, sank back into their accustomed lethargy with doubts and misgivings, and the subterranean fires continued to smoulder."

This "Left Wing Manifesto" was published in pamphlet format and was hotly debated throughout the American socialist movement prior to the split of the Socialist Party at the 1919 Emergency National Convention held in Chicago during the first week of September.

== "Left Wing Manifesto" issued by the Left Wing National Council ==
The second so-called "Left Wing Manifesto," followed the first and took inspiration from it, but was altogether different in content. This second Left Wing Manifesto was issued on the authority of the National Council of the Left Wing and was published in its final form in the July 5, 1919, edition of The Revolutionary Age. The publication of this document by the organized Left Wing section was used as the basis of prosecution of C.E. Ruthenberg, I.E. Ferguson, Benjamin Gitlow, and others for violation of the New York Criminal Anarchism statutes.

This document begins:

“The world is in crisis. Capitalism, the prevailing system of society, is in process of disintegration and collapse. Out of its vitals is developing a new social order, the system of Communist Socialism; and the struggle between this new social order and the old, is now the fundamental problem of international politics."

== Documents ==
- Manifesto and Program of the Left Wing Section Socialist Party, Local Greater New York. New York: 1919. —Full text of pamphlet edition.
- "Manifesto of the Left Wing Section of the Socialist Party: As Modified by Local Cuyahoga County, Socialist Party," The Ohio Socialist, Feb. 26, 1919.
- "Manifesto of the Left Wing National Conference," The Revolutionary Age, July 5, 1919, pp. 6-9, 1919.
