= Maximilian Cohen =

American politician

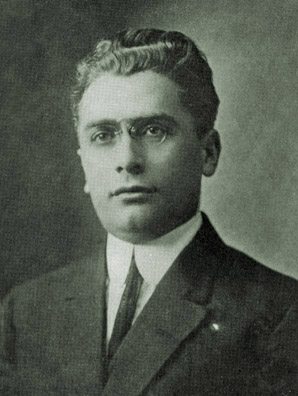
- Max Cohen, circa 1919
- Born: United States
- Occupations: Politician; Dentist; Newspaper editor
- Years active: 1904–1930s
- Known for: Founding member of the Communist Party of America; Secretary of the Left Wing National Council; Editor of The Communist
- Political party: Socialist Labor Party of America; Socialist Party of America; Communist Party of America

Maximilian Cohen was an American socialist politician of the early 20th century. Cohen held a series of important posts during the pivotal year of 1919, including secretary of the Left Wing Section of the Socialist Party for Local Greater New York, secretary of the Left Wing National Council, and business manager for the New York Communist. Cohen was also a founding member of the Communist Party of America in that same year.

== Biography ==
=== Early years ===
Cohen was born in the United States to Jewish parents. He grew up in New York City and became actively involved in radical politics as a very young man, joining the Socialist Labor Party in 1904 before moving to the Socialist Party of America in 1913. He trained and worked professionally as a dentist.

=== The early US Communist movement ===
In 1919, with the emergence of an organized revolutionary socialist left-wing faction in the Socialist Party, Cohen cast his lot with the insurgents. In January 1919 a joint meeting of representatives of all the SP branches of Local Greater New York was called. The meeting was chaired by Julius Gerber, executive secretary of Local Greater New York, who did his best to steer the meeting away from the passionate discussion of strategy and tactics which the left-wing members desired. When delegates from Queens attempted to win the floor at 11:30 pm, only to be ruled out of order, a number of radicals bolted the hall and gathered in a meeting room of their own. A city committee of 14 was elected, with Cohen as executive secretary. The group was to compose a manifesto and wage a campaign to win over the rank and file of the party to the ideas of revolutionary socialism. It was this group which wrote the famous Left Wing Manifesto, a document extensively revised by Louis C. Fraina, editor of the weekly newspaper of the Left Wing Section, Local Boston, The Revolutionary Age.

Later in 1919, Left Wing Section, Local New York decided to issue its own weekly newspaper, The New York Communist. Cohen was made business manager of the new paper, which was edited by the celebrated journalist and war correspondent John Reed. Cohen's stint in this capacity was brief, as he stepped down effective with the June 14, 1919, issue, with Ben Gitlow taking over the job.

Later in June 1919, the national Left Wing Section held an organizational Left Wing National Conference in New York City. There Cohen was elected secretary of the governing National Council of this group. Cohen was one of those members of the National Council who sought to avoid a split of the emerging Communist movement by endorsing the convention call issued by the Socialist Party of Michigan and the language federations of the Socialist Party seeking the immediate establishment of a Communist Party of America in Chicago on September 1, 1919. On this matter he came into bitter disagreement with Reed, Gitlow, and other leading members of the Left Wing Section, who sought to fight for control of the Socialist Party at its 1919 Emergency National Convention, slated for August 30 in that same city. This disagreement over tactics led to the formation of two separate organizations: the Communist Party of America (CPA) and the Communist Labor Party of America (CLP), groups which fought each other tooth and nail for the next two years before finally merging their forces permanently in the middle of 1922.

Cohen was elected as a delegate to the founding convention of the CPA in September 1919 and served as a member of the nine-member committee of the convention that wrote the CPA's program. He was also chosen as editor of the organization's official organ, a weekly newspaper published in New York called The Communist.

Cohen was elected a member of the governing Central Executive Committee of the CPA in 1920 and served on the "Executive Council" of that body, which conducted day-to-day operations. He was the organizer for District II for that organization (New York City and environs) from January 1920 onwards, and continued to serve as the editor-in-chief for the organization.

At the end of 1920, Cohen – an extremely loyal supporter of the Communist International – ran afoul of a majority group in the CPA that sought to delay merger with the successor to the CLP to maximize their factional advantage in a united organization. For his outspoken criticism of the party's disingenuous "unity" strategy, Cohen was stripped of his editorship and expelled from the party on January 16, 1921. The expelled loyalist Cohen was rewarded by the Comintern when its three-man American Agency, given the task by Moscow of forging a unified Communist Party in the USA and developing sister organizations in Mexico and South America, sent Cohen to Argentina to organize the framework of a Communist trade union movement in that country. It is unknown whether Cohen achieved anything in this role.

=== Later years ===
Cohen seems to have fallen out of the Communist Party's political leadership from that date. He periodically advertised his dentistry services in the party press in ensuing years and resurfaced in 1933 as the head of the Rose Pastor Stokes Testimonial Committee, an offshoot of the Communist Party which held a benefit dinner on her behalf on April 4, 1933, in an effort to raise funds to pay for her treatment for cancer.

Cohen was also a formal public endorser of the National Committee to Aid the Victims of German Fascism, a mass organization formed circa 1934 "for protest and relief to aid the victims and refugees of the Hitler regime". The Special Committee on Un-American Activities of the House of Representatives, chaired by Martin Dies of Texas, declared in a published report that "a glance at the personnel of this committee is sufficient to indicate that it is an auxiliary of the Communist Party".
