= Harry Winitsky =

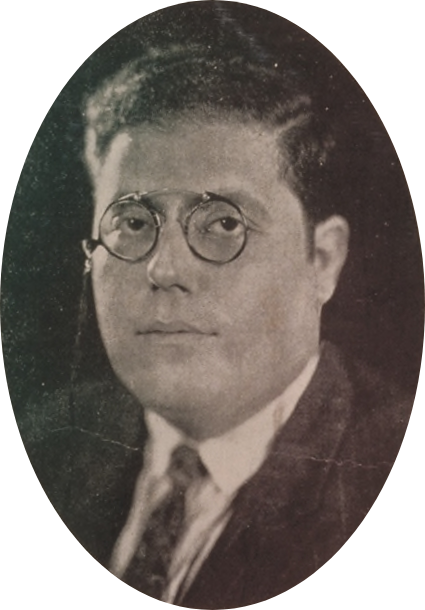
Winitsky c. 1924

Harry Mordecai Winitsky (1898–1939) was an American left wing political activist who was a founding member of the Communist Party of America. Winitsky is best remembered as one of the chief defendants of the New York "Criminal Anarchism" prosecutions that were part of the First Red Scare of 1919–1920. Winitsky served two years in prison of a 5 to 10-year sentence beginning in March 1920. Released on bail in 1922, Winitsky was ultimately pardoned by New York Governor Al Smith in January 1924. Winitsky left the Communist Party USA in 1929.

== Biography ==
=== Early years ===
Harry Winitsky was born January 25, 1898, in New York City, the son of a painter who had emigrated to the United States from Tsarist Russia.

As a boy, Winitsky attended public schools in New York City. Upon graduation, he stayed in New York to enroll at Columbia University, which he attended in 1917.

=== Early political career ===
From an early age, Winitsky became active in radical politics. He joined the youth section of the Socialist Party of America, the Young Peoples Socialist League in 1913 and went on to participate in the adult party itself through 1919. In 1919, Winitsky became active in the Left Wing Section of the Socialist Party, becoming a founding member of the Communist Party of America (CPA) in August 1919.

In 1918, Winitsky was twice jailed for participating in strike activities, serving a sentence of 10 days in West New York, New Jersey, and an additional 30-day stint in Perth Amboy, New Jersey.

=== Criminal Anarchism trial ===
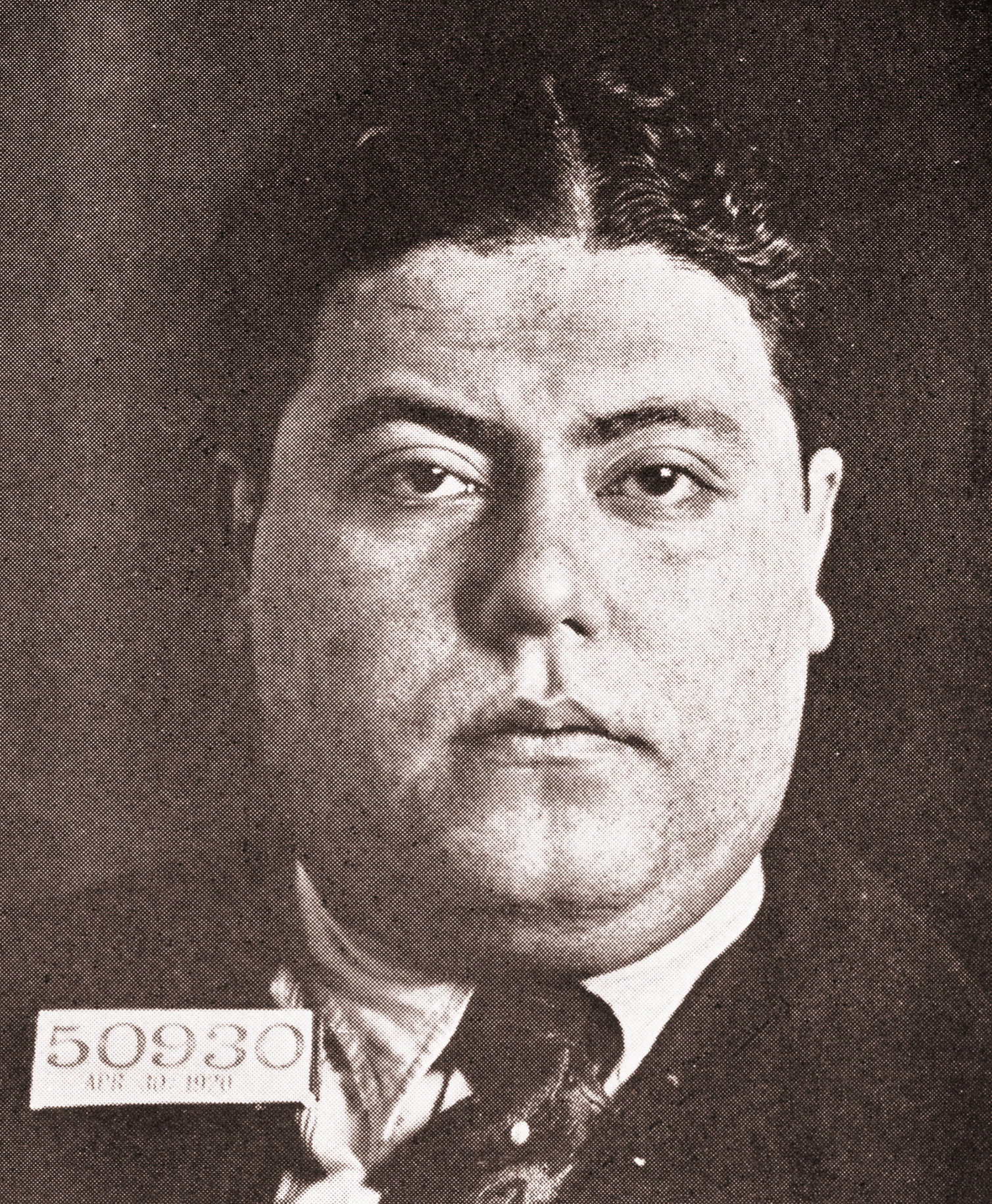
Harry Winitsky as he appeared at the time of his imprisonment for so-called "Criminal Anarchism," 1920

During the CPA's brief interval of open public existence during the last half of 1919, Winitsky served as the Executive Secretary of the Communist Party of New York — a position which drew him to the attention of law enforcement authorities, many of whom considered the Communist Party an illegal and seditious organization. Paid stenographers were assigned to transcribe Winitsky's public utterances, with a view to generating evidence for an eventual prosecution.

Although not themselves anarchists, Winitsky was one of five prominent members of the American Communist movement charged under the New York Criminal Anarchy Law of 1902, a piece of legislation hurriedly passed in the wake of the assassination of President William McKinley.

The indictments against Winitsky and his comrades charged under the New York law — Benjamin Gitlow, who preceded him, as well as James Larkin, Isaac Ferguson, and C.E. Ruthenberg, who followed — was based upon the publication and dissemination of the Manifesto of the Left Wing of the Socialist Party in The Revolutionary Age on July 5, 1919. Prosecutors used the theory that the Manifesto of the Left Wing advocated the abolition of organized government by unlawful means and that Winitsky, having been present at the Party's 1919 convention in Chicago, had subscribed to the ideas in it. An agent of the Lusk Committee testified that he had purchased copies of the manifesto from the Party's New York state headquarters at 207 East Tenth Street.

Winitsky's trial commenced on March 19, 1920, before Judge Weeks in the Criminal Branch of the New York Supreme Court and was completed on March 26. The jury remained out only a few hours before returning with a guilty verdict. On March 29, Judge Weeks passed a sentence of 5 to 10 years in prison, with Winitsky being transported to Dannemora State Penitentiary in Dannemora, New York. An appeal of the case was refused.

=== Later political career ===
In October 1921 the Workers' League nominated Benjamin Gitlow and Winitsky as their candidates for Mayor and President of the Board of Aldermen respectively. The New York City Board of Elections invalidated both nominations on the grounds that the prospective candidates were convicted criminals and were still imprisoned, and had therefore "been deprived of citizenship." John R. Voorhis, President of the elections board, stated that "We could not possibly permit the names of these men to go on the ballot. It would be a pretty state of affairs to allow felons and criminals to become eligible for office and take their places beside decent men and women."

The League sued the Board of Elections, and New York Supreme Court Justice Mullan ordered the Board to restore the candidates' names to the ballot. By the end of October, though, the New York Court of Appeals had reversed the decision, and their names did not appear on the ballot in November.

Winitsky was freed on bail in May 1922. Following his release from prison, he became active in the activities of the underground Communist Party of America and in its parallel "legal" organization, the Workers Party of America. Winitsky was a participant in the party's trade union mass organization, the Trade Union Educational League, headed by William Z. Foster.

Winitsky was a delegate to the ill-fated August 1922 convention of the underground CPA in Bridgman, Michigan — a gathering raided by state and federal law enforcement authorities. For attending this gathering Winitsky was indicted under Michigan's "Criminal Syndicalism" statutes, although he was never brought to trial on this charge.

Winitsky worked as a manager of the Communist Party's Yiddish-language daily, Morgen Freiheit from 1922 to 1923. From 1923 to 1924 Winitsky worked as a functionary for the Federated Farmer-Labor Party, a Communist Party sponsored effort to establish what it termed a "class-based" independent political party.

Governor Al Smith pardoned Winitsky on January 7, 1924, stating that "I am satisfied that Winitsky has been sufficiently punished for the crime which he committed, and I have accordingly granted him a pardon."

In 1929, Winitsky left the Communist Party USA to cast his lot with expelled party leader Jay Lovestone and his so-called Communist Party USA (Majority Group). Winitsky was not long in this organization, however, as a few years later he rejoined the Socialist Party of America, remaining active in that organization until the time of his death.

=== Death and legacy ===
At some time before his death in 1939, Winitsky changed his name to Harry Wynn.

Winitsky died of heart disease on September 10, 1939, in the Morrisania Hospital in The Bronx. He had been living at 2690 Morris Avenue. Winitsky was just 41 years old at the time of his death and was survived by his widow and three brothers: Irving, William, and Benjamin Wynn.

Norman Thomas, frequent Presidential candidate of the Socialist Party, was the chief speaker at Winitsky's funeral, held in New York City.

== Works ==
- "Speech by Harry Winitsky, Executive Secretary of the Communist Party of New York: Delivered at a Meeting Held at 175 E Broadway, NYC, December 22, 1919." Corvallis, OR: 1000 Flowers Publishing, 2005.
- "The Facts Speak for Themselves," The Revolutionary Age [New York], v. 1, no. 8 (Feb. 15, 1930), pp. 14–15.
