= New York Communist =

Defunct newspaper published in New York, United States

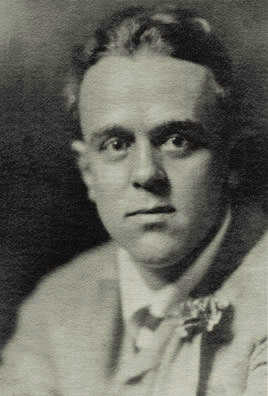
John Reed, editor of The New York Communist.

The New York Communist was a short-lived weekly newspaper issued by the Left Wing Section of the Socialist Party of Local Greater New York, encompassing the New York City metro area. The paper was edited by the radical journalist and war correspondent John Reed. Only 10 issues of the paper were produced during 1919 before the publication was absorbed by The Revolutionary Age following the Left Wing National Conference of June 1919.

== History ==
According to a declaration in its inaugural issue, no doubt written by editor John Reed, "thousands of members" of the Left Wing Section living in New York City were engaged in "fighting for control of the local Party machinery, against a fierce and unscrupulous resistance by the petty politicians who direct the Party machine." While noting enormous contributions to this movement made by the long-established Left Wing weekly of the Left Wing Section of Local Boston, The Revolutionary Age, "as long as the entire machinery is not in our hands, a New York is essential," Reed declared.

For the next 10 weeks, Reed's newspaper documented one of the most ferocious factional struggles in the history of the Socialist Party of America, a veritable war marked by arbitrary dissolutions of party units, lockouts from facilities, and takeovers of scheduled meetings. This blow-by-blow coverage which makes The New York Communist one of the most important primary sources for historians studying the process of formation of the American Communist movement during the tumultuous year of 1919.

According to historian James Weinstein:

Reed and his colleagues viewed the Socialist Party moderates as consistent supporters of 'liberal state capitalism' as a result of their commitment to parliamentarianism. Although they did not yet attack the old party leadership as prowar, they did tend to equate it with European social democracy, which, Reed wrote, was 'as responsible for the war as Wilhelm.' * * * While the Left Wing in New York, as throughout the United States, became more and more caught up with the insurrectionary perspective of the new Communist International, the old leadership of the Socialist Party reacted to the wartime repression and postwar antiradical hysteria by appealing to traditional American democratic rights and liberal values. Thus, at the same point in time, each wing exhibited one side of the polarity that has characterized the movement as a whole since World War I: in its revolutionary phase a resort to abstract revolutionary appeals; in its popular (defensive) stage a falling back on the dominant liberalism.

Editor John Reed was assisted in his task by associate editor Eadmonn MacAlpine. Business manager of the publication at its launch was Maximilian Cohen, the Executive Secretary of the Left Wing Section of Local Greater New York. Cohen was succeeded in this role by Benjamin Gitlow effective with the June 14 issue. Each issue of the paper consisted of 8 pages in each issue and bore a cover price of 5 cents per copy.

No sooner had the second edition of The New York Communist appeared when David P. Berenberg, a party regular affiliated with the Rand School of Social Science, launched a new factional document from the other side of the debate, mockingly entitled The New York Socialist. The publication adopted the jeering tone of Reed's publication and matched The New York Communist blow-for-blow in terms of personal invective, albeit concentrating its fire on the Left Wing insurgents as "an enemy ... within our ranks."

This new rival proved to be too tempting a target for the sophomorish Reed to ignore. On May 17, The New York Socialist appeared as usual at the Rand School. It was not until several thousand issues had been distributed that it was discovered that the document being distributed was an exact replica of Berenberg's publication created by Reed and MacAlpine. The parody issue prominently featured a speech purported to have been delivered by leader of the Regular faction Louis Waldman on April Fool's Day. In this mock speech, Waldman portrayed as attacking the Left Wing with the words:

So evident is their intention to disrupt the party that it has been necessary to expel all Left Wing branches and exclude the members from any vote on party affairs. If this is not disrupting the party, what is?

The complete run of The New York Communist was reprinted as an elephant folio book by the Greenwood Reprint Corporation of Westport, Connecticut in 1970 as part of their series "Radical Periodicals in the United States." A microfilm edition was also released by Greenwood at that same time.

== List of issue dates and key contents ==
- Vol. 1, No. 1 — April 19, 1919

"The Party Situation in New York" (unsigned); "The Left Wing and The Call" (unsigned); "Problems of the Representative of Soviet Russia in America" (Nicholas Hourwich); "We're Gonna Be Expelled! Help!!" (unsigned).

- Vol. 1, No. 2 — April 26, 1919

"The Left Wing and the Revolution" (Louis C. Fraina); "The Plan that Went Awry" (unsigned); "Saved by the Bourgeoisie" (A. Nyemanoff); "Left Wing Notes" (unsigned); "The Pink Terror: I. The Rape of the 17th A.D." (unsigned).

- Vol. 1, No. 3 — May 1, 1919

"Who is Splitting the Party" (editorial); "A Challenge and a Greeting" (Rose Pastor Stokes); "The Pink Terror: II. The Pillage of the 18-20th A.D." (unsigned).

- Vol. 1, No. 4 — May 8, 1919

"The Aftermath of May Day" (unsigned); "Eugene V. Debs' Position" (includes a handwritten letter to Rose Pastor Stokes); "Why Political Democracy Must Go (part 1)" (John Reed); "Left Wing Notes" (unsigned); "The Pink Terror: III. Frightfulness in the 2nd and 6th A.D. Branches" (unsigned).

- Vol. 1, No. 5 — May 15, 1919

"A Moderate Socialist Office-Holder" (Thomas Leaderless); "Soviet Russia's Red Army: An Interview with Sklandsky, Assistant Commissar of War" (Michael Puntervold); "Why Political Democracy Must Go (part 2)" (John Reed); "Left Wing Notes" (unsigned); "The Pink Terror: IV. Bloody Thursday in the 8th A.D." (unsigned).

- Vol. 1, No. 6 — May 24, 1919

"Clearing the Decks" (unsigned, attributed to John Reed); "The Party Congressional Platform for 1918" (Bertram D. Wolfe); "Why Political Democracy Must Go (part 3)" (John Reed); "Left Wing Notes" (unsigned); "The Executive Committee's Statement" (Maximilian Cohen); "The Pink Terror: V. The Abortive Massacre of the 3rd-5th and 10th A.D." (unsigned).

- Vol. 1, No. 7 — May 31, 1919

"Bourgeois Dictatorship in Local New York" (Jay Lovestone); "Call for a National Conference of the Left Wing"; "Left Wing Bogey" (Nicholas Hourwich); "The IWW and Bolshevism" (John Reed); "Why Political Democracy Must Go (part 4)" (John Reed); "Left Wing Notes" (unsigned); "A Picture of Soviet Russia" (Maxim Litvinov); "The Genealogy of Right-Wingism" (John Everett).

- Vol. 1, No. 8 — June 7, 1919

"Forty Thousand Expelled by Seven" (unsigned); "Strike Against the Bosses!" (Carl Brodsky); "The Party and the Berne Conference" (Eadmonn MacAlpine); "Why Political Democracy Must Go (part 5)" (John Reed); "Left Wing Notes" (unsigned); "Chicago Turns to the Left" (I.E. Ferguson, reprinted from The Revolutionary Age); "The Pink Terror: VI. Unrestricted Submarine Warfare in the 1st A.D." (unsigned).

- Vol. 1, No. 9 — June 14, 1919

"Scuttling the Ship" (Joseph Stilson, Alexander Stoklitsky, and 5 other federation leaders); "A Reply to a Non-Partisan League Farmer (part 1)" (Jay Lovestone); "Why Political Democracy Must Go (part 6)" (John Reed); "Left Wing Notes" (unsigned).

- Vol. 1, No. 10 — June 21, 1919

"Proletarian Dictatorship: A Speech by Nicolai Lenin" (J. Wilenkin, trans.); "A Reply to a Non-Partisan League Farmer (part 2)" (Jay Lovestone); "Why Political Democracy Must Go (part 7)" (John Reed); "Left Wing Notes" (unsigned); "The Pink Terror: VII. Secret Diplomacy in the 4th A.D." (unsigned);
