= Katterfeld =

Katterfeld is a German surname. Notable people with the surname include:

- L.E. Katterfeld (1881–1974), American socialist politician

== See also ==
- 7319 Katterfeld (1976 SA6), a main-belt asteroid discovered on 1976
