= Socialist Propaganda League of America =

Membership organization established within the ranks of the Socialist Party of America

The first publication of the Socialist Propaganda League was The Internationalist, with its debut issue dated January 6, 1917.

The Socialist Propaganda League of America (SPLA) was established in 1915, apparently by C. W. Fitzgerald of Beverly, Massachusetts. The group was a membership organization established within the ranks of the Socialist Party of America (SPA) and is best remembered as direct lineal antecedent of the Left Wing Section of the SPA and its governing National Council — the forerunner of the American Communist movement. It published a journal, The Internationalist, renamed The New International in 1917, last published in 1919.

== Organizational history ==
=== Establishment ===
A November 26, 1916, meeting in Boston approved a first manifesto for the organization and established an official journal, The Internationalist .The paper was launched in Boston at the start of January 1917 and continued under that name through April of that year. The initial editor of The Internationalist was John D. Williams.

=== Move to New York ===
In January 1917, editor Williams traveled to New York City in order to raise money for the Socialist Propaganda League and its newly launched paper. Williams made the acquaintance of a young Italian-American radical named Louis C. Fraina, until recently a key editor at the now-defunct magazine The New Review.

Beginning with an issue dated April 21, 1917, The Internationalist was moved to New York City and published by the Socialist Propaganda League as The New International. Louis Fraina became the publication's editor at that date. The publication was financed through donations made by Dutch engineer and left wing socialist S.J. Rutgers. Circulation was small, estimated by historian Theodore Draper at "no more than a thousand copies of each issue," which served to limit the paper's influence. Nevertheless, Draper and other historians of the American left regard The Internationalist and its successor as the first propaganda organs of the movement which congealed as the Left Wing Section of the Socialist Party in 1919 — forerunner of the American communist movement.

In April 1917, the name of the SPL's newspaper was changed to The New International and it was moved to New York City, to be edited by Louis C. Fraina.

The organization achieved a significant degree of public notice as leading exponents of the Bolshevik Revolution in the United States. On February 28, 1918, a mass meeting was held in a New York City hall at which Louis Fraina quixotically called for the establishment of a "Red Guard" of draft age men to be sent to Soviet Russia to fight for the Bolshevik government against the German army then invading the country. The meeting of about 2,000 people was also addressed by writer Andre Tridon as well as IWW poet Arturo Giovanitti.

=== Dissolution and legacy ===
A total of 12 issues of The New International are known to have been produced through October 1918. The New International was directly succeeded by The Revolutionary Age, also edited by Fraina, with the first issue of that paper appearing in the middle of November.

== Key members ==
- Louis C. Fraina
- Otto Huiswoud
- S.J. Rutgers

== Publications ==
- "Letter to C.W. Fitzgerald in Beverly, Massachusetts, from N. Lenin (V.I. Ul'ianov) in Berne, Switzerland, November 1915," originally published in Lenin Collected Works, Fourth Edition. Moscow: Progress Publishers, vol. 21, pp. 423–428, here at the Marxists Internet Archive
- "Letter to C.W. Fitzgerald in Beverly, Massachusetts, from N. Lenin (V.I. Ul'ianov) in Berne, Switzerland, November 1915," PDF-Version of above from Tim Davenport's article in Marxist History with remarks on dating the letter
- "Manifesto of the Socialist Propaganda League of America (Adopted at a Meeting Held in the City of Boston, November 26, 1916)," International Socialist Review, vol. 17, no. 7 (January 1917), pp. 483–485.
- "Manifesto of the Socialist Propaganda League of America (January 1919)" Revolutionary Age, vol. 1, no. 21 (March 8, 1919), pg. 8.
- "Constitution of the Socialist Propaganda League of America," The Internationalist, vol. 1, no. 1 (January 6, 1918), pg. 2.
