= Winitsky =

Winitsky is a surname. Notable people with the surname include:

- Alex Winitsky (1924–2019), American real estate developer and film producer
- Harry Winitsky (1898–1939), American radical political activist
- Van Winitsky (born 1959), American professional tennis player
