= Alexander Bittelman =

American Marxist theorist and writer

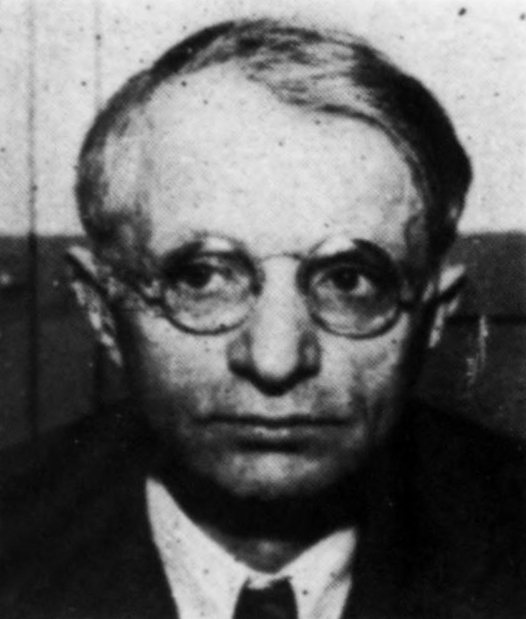
Bittelman c. 1950

Alexander "Alex" Bittelman (January 9, 1890 – April 1982) was a Russian-born Jewish-American communist political activist, Marxist theorist, influential theoretician of the Communist Party USA and writer. A founding member, Bittelman is best remembered as the chief factional lieutenant of William Z. Foster and as a longtime editor of The Communist, its monthly magazine.

== Early years ==
Alexander Bittelman was born in Berdichev (Berdychiv), in the Kiev Governorate of the Russian Empire (present-day Ukraine) on January 9, 1890. He was radicalized at an early age, joining the General Jewish Labour Bund in Lithuania, Poland and Russia (Yiddish: אַלגעמײַנער ײדישער אַרבעטער בּונד אין ליטע פוילין און רוסלאַנד, Algemeyner Yidisher Arbeter Bund in Lite, Poyln un Rusland) at just 13 years of age. Arrested by the Tsarist secret police for his revolutionary views, he served two years of political exile in Siberia.

Bittelman emigrated to the United States in 1912, settling in New York City.

== First American years ==
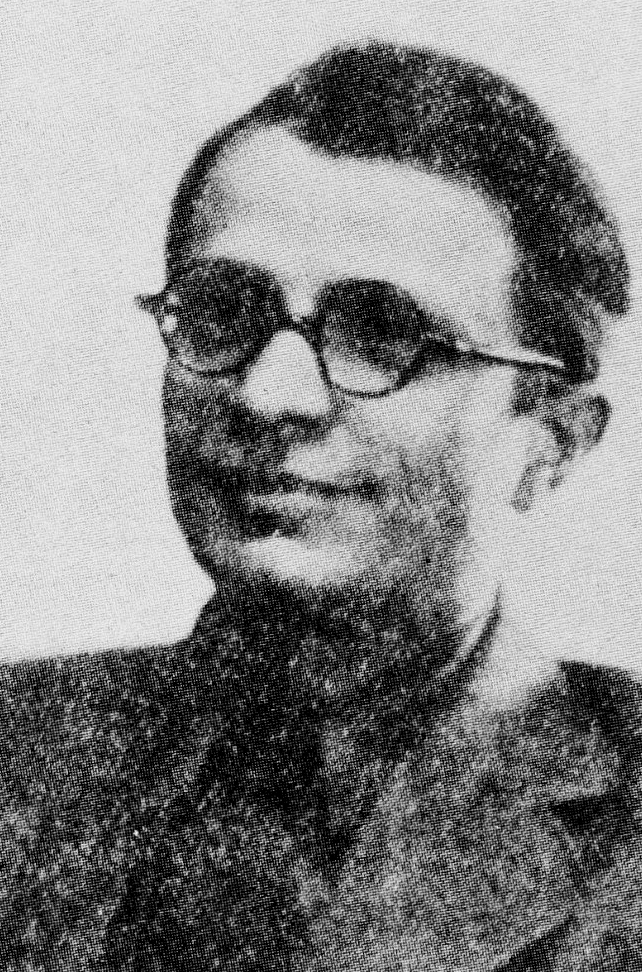
Bittelman c. 1924

Bittelman was active in the Jewish Socialist Federation of the Socialist Party of America from 1915. A committed Marxist and revolutionary, Bittelman was an adherent of the Left Wing Section of the Socialist Party when it emerged early in 1919. In September of that year, he was a founding member of the Communist Party of America (CPA) and editor of the Yiddish-language newspaper, Der Kampf (The Struggle).

At the convention in Chicago that founded the CPA, Bittelman was one of the nine members of the committee that wrote the program for the organization. He was a member of the governing Central Executive Committee of the Jewish Communist Federation from 1919 to 1920 and was elected a member of the Central Executive Committee of the CPA and its Executive Council in 1920. His most commonly used underground party name during this period was "A. Raphael." Bittelman also variously used the pseudonyms "Gabriel," "Williams," "Percy," "Ralph Barnes," and "Lentrov" in various circumstances.

According to the U.S. Department of Justice in 1948, Bittelman maintained as many as 14 aliases up to that time.

Bittelman remained with the main CPA organization l, when Executive Secretary C.E. Ruthenberg led a group of his supporters out of the organization in April 1920 to join the rival Communist Labor Party in a new United Communist Party (UCP). He saw the way that the internecine struggle between the two organizations was sapping the strength of the revolutionary socialist movement, however, and came to be an advocate of organizational unity between the CPA and the UCP. During the first half of 1921, Bittelman formed a group advocating merger of the competing communist groups in accordance with the directives of the Communist International. That, ironically, made Bittelman persona non grata with both organizations and he was briefly expelled from the CPA. Together with his co-thinker Maximilian Cohen, Bittelman formed a third group critical of the leaderships of both the CPA and the UCP called Communist Unity Committee, in which Bittelman served as secretary. Merger was finally accomplished at a convention held in May 1921, and Bittelman was welcomed back into the newly unified Communist Party of America.

Bittelman was put into the Central Executive of the unified Communist Party of America. In July 1922, he was sent with James P. Cannon to Moscow, as representatives there of the CPA. He returned later that same year to serve on the Executive Council of the Central Executive Committee of the Workers Party of America, the so-called "Legal Political Party" initiated and controlled by the secret CPA.

Bittelman was regularly a delegate to the conventions of the American Communist Party. He was a close factional associate of William Z. Foster and James P. Cannon against the faction headed by John Pepper and including C.E. Ruthenberg and Jay Lovestone, during the bitter faction fights of the 1920s.

Bittelman was editor of The Daily Worker Saturday magazine from 1926 to 1927.

Bittelman was a delegate to the 6th World Congress of the Comintern in 1928 and spoke in opposition to American Party leader Jay Lovestone. Summoned to Moscow in an effort to neutralize the factional war, Bittelman was named vicechairman of the Comintern's Far-Eastern Secretariat in 1929.

In 1930, Bittelman was dispatched to India as the Comintern Representative there. He was expelled by the British from the country for his activities, however, and returned to the United States in 1931, putting down roots in Southern California.

Bittelman returned to New York City in summer 1934 to work in the CPUSA's Propaganda Department. He took an active role in the editing of the monthly theoretical journal of the organization, The Communist, and he wrote the leading section of the magazine, "Review of the Month", from 1936.

== Cold War years ==
Bittelman (front row, sixth from right) and other staff members of the Morgen Freiheit hold up war bonds they've purchased, September 20, 1943

Although the factional war was much more subterranean during the 1930s, there was still an ongoing battle. In this fight, Bittelman remained a close associate of National Chairman William Z. Foster in opposition to General Secretary Earl Browder. Despite his closeness, Browder's fall from grace in 1945 did not mark the end of Bittelman's tenure as a top leader of the Communist Party.

In September 1946, Bittelman authored a paper for the Communist Party's National Board predicting economic collapse and a return to depression-like conditions within two years, as wartime government spending was curtailed. This report, adopted by the Board, would remain the foundation of the CPUSA's economic analysis for the next five years. Imminent economic collapse and the rise of fascism in America was seen a likely scenario, and the Communist Party girded itself for a political assault.

Following the end of World War II, the government of the United States quickly moved away from its wartime ally against Nazi Germany, the Soviet Union. A Second Red Scare swept the country, fueled by the partially-justified fear of conservative politicians that a network of spies on behalf of an aggressive and expansionistic USSR had penetrated various branches of American government, education, and popular culture. The Communist Party USA was seen by political decisionmakers as the directing center of such subversive activity.

By the end of 1947, internal pressure had grown to the point that public opinion demanded for the authority of the state to be brought to bear upon the Communist Party's members and supporters in what was seen as a campaign of national self-defense. The most simple mechanism at the government's disposal was to make use of deportation proceedings against radical resident aliens, with a view to shattering the foreign-born leadership of the Communist Party and disrupting the organization.

Owing to his noncitizen status, Bittelman was selected by federal authorities as the first prominent American Communist to be subjected to this tactic. On January 17, 1948, Bittelman was arrested while on vacation in Florida under a warrant obtained by the Federal Bureau of Investigation. The government charged that Bittelman had repeatedly violated federal law during the 1930s by traveling to the Soviet Union by means of fraudulently obtained passports and that he had maintained illegal contact with the Communist International in Moscow.

Bittelman was soon released from jail on bail. He returned to New York City at the end of January 1948 and held a news conference to publicize what the Communist Party had characterized as a "witch-hunt," during which the 58-year-old Bittelman stoked the patriotic fire of conservative forces by declaring to reporters that he "would not fight against the Soviet Union in any war" since "any war against the Soviet Union would be an unjust war." Angered by Bittelman's speedy release and defiant public comments, U.S. Attorney General Tom C. Clark was soon in front of the House Un-American Activities Committee to reiterate his desire to use deportation statutes "to remove from among us those aliens who believe in a foreign ideology."

The wheels of the legal process turned slowly in Bittelman's deportation case, and it was not until September 1949 that a deportation hearing was held at which he was charged with illegal membership in an organization which taught the doctrine of violent overthrow of the United States government. At his hearing Bittelman emphasized the distinction between "teaching the Marxist-Leninist theory of social change, including the law of violent proletarian revolution" and "teaching the overthrow of a particular government by violence." The government's attempt to deport Bittelman ended unsuccessfully.

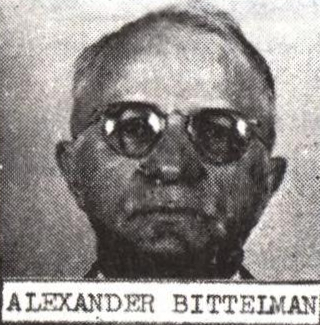
Bittelman's FBI mugshot, 1951

A series of prosecutions and convictions of top Communist Party leaders under the 1940 Smith Act followed. Certain that American fascism was around the corner, the Communist Party leadership went "underground," taking up a furtive and secret existence, leaving only a handful of members to occupy public party posts. The CPUSA's public image thereby sustained yet another blow and its isolation increased. Having witnessed the failure of similar party policies in the early 1920s, Bittelman emerged as a critic of the increasingly shrill and sectarian political line of the Communist Party, breaking with party chief William Z. Foster in the party's Administrative Committee.

Early in 1953, Bittelman began to argue for the "non-inevitablility of war and fascism" and to call for an end to the underground form of party organization in favor of an open "United Front Marxist Party." Bittelman's ideas were quickly rejected by the CPUSA's leadership, however, scorned as examples of so-called "liquidationism."

In 1953, with the Justice Department prosecuting top Communist Party leaders in waves, Bittelman's turn arrived. Bittelman was indicted, tried, and convicted for violation of the Smith Act. He served a three-year prison term, being freed on May 26, 1957. While in prison, Bittelman received Social Security payments, which cause a change in the tax law and, enacted as part of the Social Security Amendments of 1956, Internal Revenue Code "section 3121(b)(17) provides that Social Security taxes must not be withheld from wages earned for "service in the employ of any organization which is performed (A) in any year during any part of which such organization is registered, or there is in effect a final order of the Subversive Activities Control Board requiring such organization to register, under the Internal Security Act of 1950, as amended, as a Communist-action organization, a Communist-front organization, or a Communist-infiltrated organization, and (B) after June 30, 1956."

== Years after prison ==
Bittelman was released to find a different Communist Party than the one he had left. In the wake of the death of Joseph Stalin and the exposure of the excesses and crimes of his regime as well as the working class revolt in Hungary, a movement grew for liberalization in the Communist Party. Bittelman was attracted to this trend and wrote a 12 part series for the Party's newspaper, The Worker, beginning on October 1, 1957. In February 1958, he published his last piece in Political Affairs, the party's theoretical magazine, in which he criticized the views of William Z. Foster and argued that only expansion of the welfare state would permit a peaceful transition to socialism. Bittelman announced plans to publish his memoirs in 1959.

A hard-line faction headed by Gus Hall had by this time consolidated its hold of the CPUSA, however, and Bittelman's planned memoir was condemned by the new party leadership on October 14, 1959. Bittelman was expelled from the Communist Party in the aftermath of this decision.

Bittelman was formally expelled by his Communist Party club on November 14, 1960. This decision was confirmed by the National Committee of the CPUSA at its plenum held at the end of January 1961.

Bittelman was called before the House Un-American Activities Committee to provide testimony about his former organization on November 21, 1961, but he refused to testify, citing his rights under the First and Fifth Amendments to the U.S. Constitution.

== Death and legacy ==
Following his expulsion and refusal to testify in 1961, Alexander Bittelman lived out the last two decades of his life in quiet at Croton-on-Hudson, New York. He died in April 1982.

Bittelman left an unpublished memoir, Things I Have Learned, which resides at the Robert F. Wagner Labor Archives of Bobst Library at New York University. The manuscript is available there for use by researchers.

== Bibliography ==
=== Books and pamphlets ===
- Parties and Issues in the Election Campaign. Chicago: Literature Department, Workers Party of America, n.d. (1924).
- Revolutionary Struggle Against War versus Pacifism. New York: Workers Library Publishers, n.d. (1931).
- The Communist Party in Action. New York: Workers Library Publishers, 1932.
- From Left-Socialism to Communism. New York: Workers Library Publishers, 1933.
- Fifteen Years of the Communist Party. New York: Workers Library Publishers, 1934.
- The Advance of the United Front: A Documentary Account. New York: Central Committee, Communist Party USA, 1934.
- Leninism: The Only Marxism Today: A Discussion of the Characteristics of Declining Capitalism. With V.J. Jerome. New York: Workers Library Publishers, 1934.
- How Can We Share the Wealth? The Communist Way versus Huey Long. New York: Workers Library Publishers, 1935.
- Going Left: The Left Wing Formulates a 'Draft for a Program for the Socialist Party of the United States. New York: Workers Library Publishers, 1936.
- How to Win Social Justice: Can Coughlin and Lemke Do It? New York: Workers Library Publishers, 1936.
- The Townsend Plan: What It Is and What It Isn't. New York: Workers Library Publishers, 1936.
- Milestones in the History of the Communist Party. New York: Workers Library Publishers, 1937.
- Problems of Party Building. New York: Workers Library Publishers, 1937.
- Party Building and Political Leadership. (with William Z. Foster, James Ford and Charles Krumbein) New York: Workers Library Publishers, n.d. (1937).
- Trotsky the Traitor. New York: Workers Library Publishers, 1937.
- Break the Economic and Political Sabotage of the Monopolists. n.c. [New York]: n.p. [Communist Party], n.d. [1937].
- Jewish Unity for Victory. New York: Workers Library Publishers, 1943.
- Should Jews Unite? Jewish People's Unity as a Force for American National Unity. New York: Morning Freiheit Association, n.d. (c. 1943).
- The Jewish People Will Live On! New York: Morning Freiheit Association, n.d. (1944).
- The Jewish People Face the Post-War World. New York: Morning Freiheit Association, 1945.
- Palestine: What is the Solution? New York: Morning Freiheit Association, 1946.
- Study Guide on the Jewish Question. New York: National Jewish Commission of the Communist Party, n.d. (c. 1946).
- Program for Survival: The Communist Position on the Jewish Question. New York: New Century Publishers, 1947.
- The Communist Position on the Negro Question. (Contributor.) New York: New Century Publishers, 1947.
- To Secure Jewish Rights: The Communist Position. New York: New Century Publishers, 1948.
- Thirteen Communists Speak to the Court. (Contributor.) New York: New Century Publishers, 1953.
- The Bolshevik Revolution and Its Historical Consequences. undated
- A Communist Views America's Future. undated
- Democracy and Dictatorship. undated
- Disaster or Wellbeing, Two Lines of Economic Development. undated
- Jewish Survival, a Marxist Outlook. undated
- War Economy and Crisis. undated
- Things I Have Learned. 1963.

=== Articles ===
- "A Memorandum on the Present Situation in the Communist Movement in America, Adopted by the Communist Unity Committee for Submission to the Executive Committee of the Third Communist International," Communist Unity, February 1, 1921, pp. 3–4.
- As "A. Raphael": "The Task of the Hour," The Communist [unified CPA], October 1921, pp. 3–6.
- "Outline for a History of the Communist Party in America," Written circa 1923, first published in U.S. House of Representatives, Report of the Special Committee to Investigate Communist Activities, part V, vol. 4, pp. 435–448.
- “The Crusade Against the Foreign-Born," The Liberator, whole no. 73 (May 1924), pp. 17–20.
- "Leading the World Revolution," The Liberator, whole no. 75 (July 1924), pp. 13–15.
- "Exit Savinkov," Workers Monthly, vol. 4, no. 1 (November 1924), pp. 24–28.
- "In Retrospect: A Critical Review of Our Past Labor Party Policy in the Light of the Present Situation," Workers Monthly, vol. 4, no. 2 (December 1924), pp. 85–90.
- "Lenin: Leader and Comrade," Workers Monthly, vol. 4, no. 3 (January 1925), pp. 99–101.
- "A Conference of Progressive Reactionaries," Workers Monthly, vol. 4, no. 4 (February 1925), pp. 166–167.
- “Kellogg in Paris — Johnson in the Senate," Workers Monthly, vol. 4, no. 5 (March 1925), pp. 201–203.
- “Max Eastman on Leninism," Workers Monthly, vol. 4, no. 6 (April 1925), pp. 255–256, 288.
- "On the Road to a Bolshevik Party in America," Workers Monthly, vol. 4, no. 11 (September 1925), pp. 482–484.
- “The Great People’s Referendum," Part 1: Workers Monthly, vol. 5, no. 10 (August 1926), pp. 462–465; Part 2: Workers Monthly, vol. 5, no. 11 (September 1926), pp. 517–519.
- "American Capitalism Prepards for Class War," Workers Monthly, vol. 5, no. 13 (November 1926), pp. 605–606.
- "Lessons of the Russian Revolution," The Communist, vol. 6, no. 7 (November 1927), pp. 442–450.
- "May Day, 1928," The Communist, vol. 7, no. 5 (May 1928), pp. 259–261.
- "A New Bid for World Domination," The Communist, vol. 10, no. 8 (August 1931), pp. 675–684.
- "The Latest Phase of the British Crisis in its Reverberations in the United States," The Communist, vol. 10, no. 10 (November 1931), pp. 903–911.
- "The Party Anniversary in the Light of Our Present Tasks," The Communist, vol. 10, no. 11 (December 1931), pp. 975–984.
- "To the Study of Lenin and Our Party," The Communist, vol. 11, no. 1 (January 1932), pp. 3–8.
- "The Growth of the Party in the Struggle Against Centrism and Sectarianism," The Communist, vol. 11, no. 5 (May 1932), pp. 433–442.
- "From Left Socialism to Communism," The Communist, vol. 12, no. 9 (September 1933), pp. 846–863.
- "The New Deal and the Old Deal," The Communist, Part 1: vol. 13, no. 1 (January 1934), pp. 81–98; Part 2: vol. 13, no. 2 (February 1934), pp. 182–192.
- "Milestones of Comintern Leadership," The Communist, vol. 13, no. 3 (March 1934), pp. 235–248.
- "For a Bolshevik Anti-War Struggle," The Communist, vol. 13, no. 8 (August 1934), pp. 755–772.
- "Leninism is the Only Marxism of the Imperialist Era," With V.J. Jerome. Part 1: The Communist, vol. 13, no. 10 (October 1934), pp. 1033–1056. Part 2: The Communist, vol. 13, no. 11 (November 1934), pp. 1125–1156.
- "Developments in the United Front," The Communist, vol. 13, no. 12 (December 1934), pp. 1195–1213.
- "For Leninism — For a Soviet America!" The Communist, vol. 14, no. 1 (January 1935), pp. 6–22.
- "The Socialist Revolution in the United States," The Communist, vol. 14, no. 2 (February 1935), pp. 127–147.
- "Report to the National Agitation and Propaganda Conference, January 18, 1935," The Communist, vol. 14, no. 3 (March 1935), pp. 240–261.
- "Approaching the Seventh World Congress of the Communist International," The Communist, vol. 14, no. 6 (June 1935), pp. 518–527.
- "The Supreme Court, the New Deal, and the Class Struggle," The Communist, vol. 14, no. 7 (July 1935), pp. 579–603.
- "The United Front Against Imperialist War," The Communist, vol. 14, no. 8 (August 1935), pp. 675–685.
- "Problems of the Struggle for Peace," The Communist, vol. 14, no. 11 (November 1935), pp. 1034–1043.
- "Winning the Masses to Fight for Peace," The Communist, vol. 14, no. 12 (December 1935), pp. 1171–1181.
- "The Party and the People's Front," The Communist, vol. 16, no. 8 (August 1937), pp. 709–715.
- "The Vanguard Role of the Communist Party: On the Occasion of the Eighteenth Anniversary of the CPUSA," The Communist, vol. 16, no. 9 (September 1937), pp. 808–823.
- "Some Problems Before the Tenth Convention of the Communist Party," The Communist, vol. 17, no. 7 (July 1938), pp. 624–629.
- "A Historic View of the Struggle for Democracy," The Communist, vol. 17, no. 8 (August 1938), pp. 711–721.
- "The Reaction to European Events," World News and Views, vol. 19 (April 19, 1939), pp. 395–396.
- "For a Democratic Progressive Front at the Presidential Elections," World News and Views, vol. 19 (May 20, 1939), pp. 619–620.
- "Government Intervention in the National Economy," The Communist, vol. 23, no. 10 (October 1944), pp. 893–910.
- "Cartels and the Economic Disarmament of Europe," Political Affairs, vol. 24, no. 3 (March 1945), pp. 229–245.
- "What Is the Outlook for the Jewish People?" Political Affairs, vol. 24, no. 10 (October 1945), pp. 918–934.
- "How Shall We Fight for Full Employment?" Political Affairs, vol. 25, no. 1 (January 1946), pp. 50–66.
- "Wages and Profits under Monopoly Capitalism," Political Affairs, vol. 25, no. 5 (May 1946), pp. 423–437.
- "The Anglo-American Bloc," Political Affairs, vol. 25, no. 7 (July 1946), pp. 588–596.
- "The Twenty-Seventh Party Anniversary," Political Affairs, vol. 25, no. 10 (October 1946), pp. 867–878.
- "Economic Trends and Perspectives," Political Affairs, vol. 25, no. 11 (November 1946), pp. 1001–1010.
- "Exchange of Letters with Editor," Congress Weekly, vol. 13 (December 13, 1946), pp. 13–15.
- "The Role of Jewish Communists," Jewish Life, vol. 1, no. 1 (January 1947), pp. 6–8.
- "A Communist Wage Policy," Political Affairs, vol. 26, no. 3 (March 1947), pp. 221–238.
- "A Democratic Solution for Palestine," Political Affairs, vol. 26, no. 7 (July 1947), pp. 576–585.
- "The Struggle Against the Approaching Economic Crisis," Political Affairs, vol. 26, no. 9 (September 1947), pp. 834–854.
- "New Tasks and Realignments in the Struggle for the Jewish State in Palestine," Political Affairs, vol. 27, no. 2 (February 1948), pp. 146–155.
- "The New State of Israel," Political Affairs, vol. 27, no. 8 (August 1948), pp. 720–730.
- "The Beginning of the Economic Crisis in the United States," Political Affairs, Part 1: vol. 28, no. 7 (July 1949), pp. 22–32; Part 2: vol. 28, no. 8 (August 1949), pp. 22–34.
- "Our Party's Thirtieth Anniversary," Political Affairs, vol. 28, no. 9 (September 1949), pp. 1–13.
- "Credo of a Communist," Jewish Life, vol. 3, no. 10 (October 1949), pp. 15–21.
- "Wall Street Optimism and the Developing Crisis," Political Affairs, vol. 28, no. 10 (October 1949), pp. 26–32.
- "Reverse Wall Street's Verdict and Prevent the Outlawing of a Working-Class Political Party!" Political Affairs, vol. 28, no. 11 (November 1949), pp. 1–9.
- "Jerusalem, National Independence, and Peace," Political Affairs, vol. 29, no. 1 (January 1950), pp. 66–77.
- "The Course of the Developing Economic Crisis," Political Affairs, vol. 29, no. 3 (March 1950), pp. 46–57.
- "We are the Vanguard Party of Peace," Political Affairs, vol. 29, no. 9 (September 1950), pp. 1–14.
- "Wall Street's War Preparations and the People's Living Standards," Political Affairs, vol. 29, no. 10 (October 1950), pp. 58–74.
- "Where is the Monthly Review Going?" Political Affairs, vol. 30, no. 5 (May 1951), pp. 34–53.
- "Who Are the Conspirators?" Political Affairs, vol. 30, no. 7 (July 1951), pp. 9–21.
- "Mass Tasks Facing the Party Today," Political Affairs, vol. 30, no. 9 (September 1951), pp. 15–28.
- "Lenin's Teachings and the Liberation of Humanity," Political Affairs, vol. 31, no. 1 (January 1952), pp. 1–11.
- "Corruption, War-Mongering, and the Pro-Fascist Reaction," Political Affairs, vol. 31, no. 3 (March 1952), pp. 1–14.
- "New Economic Dangers and How to Meet Them," Political Affairs, vol. 32, no. 5 (May 1953), pp. 30–47.
- "Key Problems of Party Program," Political Affairs, vol. 37, no. 2 (February 1958), pp. 36–44.

== Other sources consulted ==
- Joel Seidman with Olive Golden and Yaffa Draznin, Communism in the United States: A Bibliography. Ithaca, NY: Cornell University Press, 1967; pp. 53–58, 395.
