= Amsterdam Bureau of the Communist International =

Organisation of the Comintern

The Amsterdam Bureau of the Communist International was an outpost of the Communist International established by the Executive Committee of the Communist International (ECCI) in September 1919. At the same time the ECCI also set up the Scandinavian Bureau in Stockholm, the Southern Bureau in Kiev, the Vienna Bureau, the Balkan Bureau and the Western Europe Secretariat. Sebald Rutgers was appointed secretary and dispatched from Moscow with a number of precious stones whose value accounted for the bulk of the twenty million roubles allocated by the ECCI to finance the bureau.
