= The Class Struggle (magazine) =

American Marxist theoretical magazine

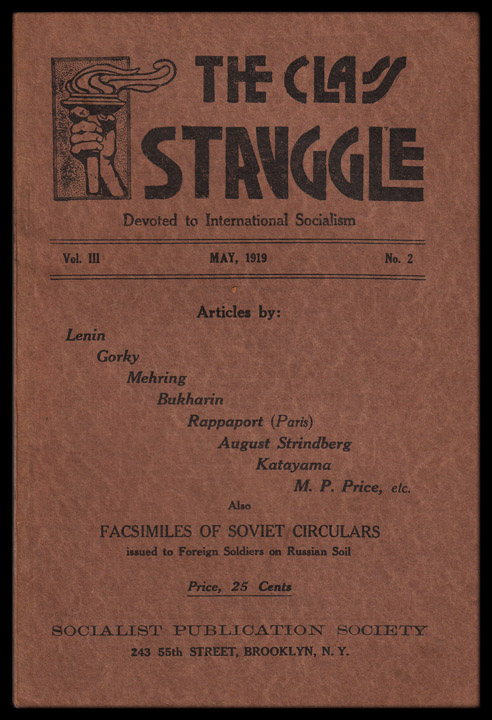
The Class Struggle and most of the pamphlets associated with it bore distinctive brown cardstock covers.

The Class Struggle was a bi-monthly Marxist theoretical magazine published in New York City by the Socialist Publication Society. The SPS also published a series of pamphlets, mostly reprints from the magazine during the short period of its existence. Among the initial editors of the publication were Ludwig Lore, Marxist theoreticians Louis B. Boudin and Louis C. Fraina, the former of whom left the publication in 1918. In the third and final year of the periodical, The Class Struggle emerged as one of the primary English-language voices of the left wing factions within the American Socialist Party and its final issue was published in 1919 by the nascent Communist Labor Party of America.

== History ==
=== The Left Wing movement ===
Even prior to the establishment of the Socialist Party of America (SPA) in the summer of 1901, there had been a more or less conscious left wing movement, which looked with disdain upon advocacy of a "minimum program" of ameliorative reform, instead arguing for the wholesale revolutionary transformation of politics and society. World War I intensified the feelings of alienation of the left wing from the moderate leadership of the SPA and their almost exclusive concentration upon electoral politics. The Left saw the failure of the parliamentary Socialists of Europe to avert the catastrophe of war as indicative of what one historian has aptly characterized as the "fatal dilution of revolutionary principles by the party." The radicals, in ever more strident terms, objected to the "parliamentary cretinism" and "sausage socialism" of the moderate wing of the socialist movement, gradually coming to view its existence as an impediment on the achievement of socialist change.

Further impetus to the Left Wing was provided by the victory of the Bolshevik faction of the Russian Social-Democratic Workers Party, headed by V.I. Lenin in November 1917. The Bolshevik triumph seemed to validate the perspective of the radicals that socialist change would come through revolutionary upheaval rather than through piecemeal parliamentary reform. Parallel revolutionary efforts in Germany, Finland, and Hungary seemed to signal a new historical moment to the often young and always enthusiastic Left Wing movement. This movement sought to organize itself and to give voice to its ideas via the printed word. The magazine The Class Struggle, established late in the spring of 1917, was a particularly important vehicle for this emerging Left Wing.

=== Earlier American left wing theoretical journals ===
The Class Struggle was by no means the first radical theoretical magazine in America. Two publications stood out as key influences during the first two decades of the 20th Century — Charles H. Kerr's International Socialist Review, published in Chicago from 1900 to 1918, and The New Review, a New York magazine published from 1913 to 1916 to which future Class Struggle editor Louis C. Fraina was a key contributor.

Historian Theodore Draper credits a successor to The New Review, called The New International, as the newspaper which played the "historic role as the first propaganda organ" of the proto-Communist Left Wing Section. Ten issues of the four-page newspaper were produced in New York, also edited by Louis Fraina and financed in large part by radical Dutch engineer S.J. Rutgers. No more than 1,000 copies were produced of each issue and the practical influence of the publication was ultimately limited. While not properly a theoretical journal itself, The New International did clearly play a transitional role linking the earlier publications of the Left Wing with The Class Struggle.

=== Establishment of the publication ===
Early in 1917, leading Russian-Jewish revolutionary socialist Leon Trotsky arrived in New York. He was immediately drawn into a meeting on January 14, 1917 of about 20 Left Wing Socialists at the home of German-American radical Ludwig Lore. Also attending the gathering were several other top émigrés from the Russian empire, including feminist Alexandra Kollontay, theoretician Nikolai Bukharin, and orator V. Volodarsky. Joining them were Sen Katayama, an exile from Japan, engineer S.J. Rutgers, and leading American radicals Louis B. Boudin, Louis C. Fraina, and John D. Williams of the Socialist Propaganda Society of Boston. This meeting, called to discuss "a program of action for Socialists of the Left," debated whether American radicals should separate themselves from the Socialist Party of America or stay within the organization. While Bukharin called for a prompt split, Trotsky sought the Left Wing to remain in the party and won the debate on the question.

The January 14 meeting formed a subcommittee to construct a definite proposal for the next session of the group. This committee came back with a proposal for the establishment of a bimonthly theoretical journal to further advance the views of the Zimmerwald Left in America. The Class Struggle would ultimately emerge as the publication envisioned by this committee established by New York City radicals.

The Class Struggle was produced by a publishing holding company known as the Socialist Publication Society. Physical production of the magazine took place at the 15 Spruce Street address of the New Yorker Volkszeitung, the German-language socialist daily newspaper then edited by Ludwig Lore.

=== Demise of the publication ===
At a special meeting of the Socialist Publication Society in October 1919, it was decided to transfer ownership of The Class Struggle, along with all pamphlets and books published during its existence to the Communist Labor Party, the organization which Ludwig Lore and a majority of the German Socialist Federation supported. With co-editor Fraina gone to the rival Communist Party of America and nominal co-editor Eugene V. Debs in the penitentiary for his anti-war speech delivered at Canton, Ohio, a reshuffling of the editorial board was in order. Joining Lore were the two other members of the CLP's editorial committee — Jack Carney, editor of the Duluth, Minnesota CLP weekly, Truth, and Russian Federation member Gregory Weinstein, formerly the editor of the Russian-language weekly, Novyi Mir.

This shift of formal ownership proved to be ill-advised and fatal to the publication, however, as in November 1919 a series of raids began against the nascent American communist movement, culminating in the nationwide "Palmer Raids" of January 2/3, 1920. The Communist Labor Party was driven underground in the aftermath, its membership decimated, its sources of income disconnected, its legal expenses exponentially increased. The November 1919 issue of The Class Struggle, proved to be the magazine's last.

Throughout the course of its existence, a total of 13 issues of The Class Struggle were produced, along with approximately a dozen pamphlets reissuing selected articles from its pages. The Class Struggle was reissued in book form in three bound volumes by the Greenwood Reprint Company in 1968, assuring its availability to research libraries around the world. Every issue of "The Class Struggle", digitized by the Riazanov Library digital archive project, can also be viewed and downloaded as a pdf file from The Class Struggle page at the Marxists Internet Archive.

== SPS pamphlets ==
- The Class struggle and socialism: a statement of the problems confronting the Socialist movement to-day, and a call to action New York: Socialist Publication Society, 1917
- Radek and Ransome on Russia: being Arthur Ransome's "Open letter to America" by Arthur Ransome and Karl Radek Brooklyn: Socialist Publication Society, 1918
- A letter to American workingmen: from the Socialist Soviet Republic of Russia by Vladimir Lenin Brooklyn: Socialist Publication Society, 1918
- An open letter to American liberals: with a note on recent documents by Santeri Nuorteva Brooklyn: Socialist Publication Society, 1918
- J'Accuse: An Address in Court by Friedrich Adler Brooklyn: Socialist Publication Society, 1918
- The socialist attitude on the war by Louis Fraina Brooklyn: Socialist Publication Society, 1918
- The old order in Europe and the new order in Russia by Morgan Philips Price Brooklyn: Socialist Publication Society, 1918
- The Soviet, the Terror and Intervention by Morgan Philips Price Brooklyn: Socialist Publication Society, 1918
- One year of revolution: celebrating the first anniversary of the founding of the Russian Soviet Republic ... November 7, 1918 Brooklyn: Socialist Publication Society, 1918
- Education and art in Soviet Russia: in the light of official decrees and documents Brooklyn: Socialist Publication Society, 1919
- The crisis in the German social-democracy: (the "Junius" pamphlet) Brooklyn: Socialist Publication Society, 1919
- A New Letter to the Workers of Europe and America by Vladimir Lenin Brooklyn: Socialist Publication Society, 1919

== Chronological listing of content ==
Vol. 1, No. 1 (May–June 1917)

- Editors, "The Task Before Us," pp. 1–14. — reprinted as a pamphlet, see above
- N. Bukharin, "The Russian Revolution and Its Significance," pp. 14–21.
- Louis C. Fraina, "The War and America," pp. 22–33.
- Friedrich Adler, "Majority Limitations and Minority Rights," pp. 33–41.
- Louis B. Boudin, "The Emergency National Convention of the Socialist Party," pp. 41–50.
- William Bohn, "An Educational Experiment," pp. 50–56.
- James Peter Warbasse, "The Red Cross and War," pp. 57–62.
- Anton Pannekoek, "After the War Ends," pp. 62–69.
- Ludwig Lore, "Reform in Germany?" pp. 69–80.
- J. Koettgen, "On the Road to Reaction," pp. 80–87.
- Ludwig Lore, "Conscription," pp. 88–90.
- Louis B. Boudin, "America in the War — The Reason Why," pp. 90–94.
- Louis B. Boudin, "America in the War — War Aims," pp. 94–96.
- Louis C. Fraina, "The First Victims of War," pp. 96–98.
- Louis B. Boudin, "The Autocrat in the White House," pp. 98–99.
- Louis B. Boudin, "The National Convention and Its War Resolutions," pp. 100–101.
- Louis B. Boudin, "A Deserved Rebuke," pp. 101–103.
- Ludwig Lore, "Kaiser Socialists," pp. 103–104.
- Louis B. Boudin, "The Mission That Failed," pp. 104–106.
- "Documents for Future Socialist History," pp. 106–112.

Vol. 1, No. 2 (July–August 1917)

- Ludwig Lore, "To Make the World Safe for Democracy," pp. 1–8.
- Austin Lewis, "War and Public Opinion," pp. 9–16.
- Louis B. Boudin, "Socialist Policy in Peace and War," pp. 16–35.
- Joseph A. Whitehorn, "A War Legislature," pp. 36–46.
- Eric Niel, "Political Majorities and Industrial Minorities," pp. 46–59.
- Robert Rives LaMonte, "Socialists and War," pp. 59–75.
- Louis C. Fraina, "Socialists and War," pp. 75–99. — Reprinted as a pamphlet, see above
- W., "Philipp Scheidemann: A Pen Picture," pp. 100–101.
- Friedrich Adler, "J'accuse! Friedrich Adler's Address in Court [part 1]," pp. 102–114. — Reprinted as a pamphlet, see above
- Louis B. Boudin, "Peace with Victory," pp. 115–116.
- Louis B. Boudin, "Lost — A Peace Demand," pp. 117–118.
- Louis B. Boudin, "Automobile Patriots," pp. 118–119.
- Louis B. Boudin, "Mr. Wilson and Child Labor," pp. 119–120.
- Louis C. Fraina, "The War and American Unionism," pp. 120–123.
- Louis B. Boudin, "The Russian Revolution and the War," pp. 123–126.
- Ludwig Lore, "On the Road to a New International," pp. 126–129.
- Ludwig Lore, "Friedrich Adler," pp. 129–132.
- Ludwig Lore, "The Socialist Party and Stockholm," pp. 132–135.
- Ludwig Lore, "Spargo & Co.," pp. 135–138.
- Louis C. Fraina, "The Attitude of Lenin," pp. 138–141.
- "Documents for Future Socialist History," pp. 142–152.

Vol. 1, no. 3 (September–October 1917)

- Austin Lewis, "The New Labor Movement of the West," pp. 1–10.
- Louis B. Boudin, "Socialist Terms of Peace," pp. 11–39.
- Morris Kolchin, "The Russian Revolution and its Problems," pp. 40–56.
- Louis C. Fraina, "Labor and Democracy," pp. 57–62.
- Friedrich Adler, "J'accuse! Friedrich Adler's Address in Court [part 2]," pp. 102–114.
- Sen Katayama, Recent Development of Capitalism in Japan," pp. 72-82.
- C.D., "La Vie des Mots," pp. 83–84.
- Franz Mehring, "Our Old Masters and Their Modern Substitutes," pp. 85–93.
- Louis B. Boudin, "The Pope's Proposal and Wilson's Reply," pp. 94–97.
- Louis B. Boudin, "People's Council and the National Alliance," pp. 97–99.
- Ludwig Lore, "Meyer London," pp. 100–101.
- Ludwig Lore, "Tom Mooney and Alexander Berkman," pp. 101–103.
- Ludwig Lore, "A Savior of His Country," pp. 103–105.
- Editors, "Germany Stands Pat," pp. 105–107.
- S. J. Rutgers, "Boudin's Policy in Peace and War," pp. 108–111.

Vol. 1, no. 4 (November–December 1917)

- Louis C. Fraina, "The IWW Trial," pp. 1–5.
- Leon Trotsky, "Pacifism in the Service of Imperialism," pp. 6–14.
- Louis B. Boudin, "The Passing of the Nation," pp. 15–34.
- Karl Kautsky, "The Russian Revolution," pp. 35–39.
- Ludwig Lore, "Our Obedient Congress," pp. 40–48.
- N. Lenin, "Political Parties in Russia," pp. 49–63.
- S.J. Rutgers, "Imperialism and the New Middle Class," pp. 64–71.
- Edward Dryden, "The Case of Fraina," pp. 72–79.
- Lionel Petersen, "Stockholm," pp. 80–84.
- Louis B. Boudin, "The Tragedy of the Russian Revolution," pp. 85–90.
- Marius, "The Task of the Constituent Assembly," pp. 91–99.
- Ludwig Lore, "The New York Mayorality Campaign," pp. 100–106.
- Louis B. Boudin, "Act, Not Withdraw," pp. 106–109.
- Louis B. Boudin, "The Italian Debacle," pp. 109–113.
- Louis B. Boudin, "The Neue Zeit — An Obituary," pp. 113–116.
- Louis C. Fraina, "Making Haste Slowly," pp. 116–120.

Vol. 2, no. 1 (January–February 1918)

- Leon Trotsky, "A Letter from Leon Trotsky to Ex-Minister Jules Guesde," pp. 1–8.
- Adolph Germer, "Samuel Gompers," pp. 9–15.
- Rosa Luxemburg, "Peace and the International," pp. 16–28.
- Louis C. Fraina, "The Proletarian Revolution in Russia," pp. 29–67.
- Ludwig Lore, "Armistice on All Fronts," pp. 68–72.
- Louis B. Boudin, "The Common Enemy," pp. 73–95.
- Fabian, "Disarmament," pp. 96–100.
- Louis Brandt, "Bolsheviki — The Masters of the Revolution," pp. 101–106.
- V. Algassov, "Plekhanov and Breshkovskaya," pp. 107–109.
- "Documents for Future Socialist History," pp. 110–112.
- Louis B. Boudin, "The Peace Negotiations," pp. 113–117.
- Louis B. Boudin, "Eleventh Hour Conversions," pp. 117–120.
- Editors, "Who Speaks?" pp. 120–123.
- Ludwig Lore, "Our National Executive Committee," pp. 123–125.
- Louis B. Boudin, "St. Louis and After," pp. 126–128.

Vol. 2, no. 2 (March–April 1918)

- Florence Kelley, "Changing Labor Conditions in Wartime," pp. 129–142.
- W.D., "The Land Question in the Russian Revolution," pp. 143–160.
- John J. Kallen, "Forming a War Psychosis," pp. 161–170.
- Santeri Nuorteva, "The Future of the Russian Revolution," pp. 171–185.
- Louis B. Boudin, "The Tragedy of the Russian Revolution: Second Act," pp. 186–192.
- Karl Liebknecht, "Self-Determination of Nations and Self-Defense," pp. 193–203.
- Ludwig Lore, "Germany, the Liberator," pp. 204–212.
- Leon Trotsky, "The State in Russia — Old and New," pp. 213–221.
- Louis B. Boudin, "The New Danger: Peace by Negotiation," pp. 222–228.
- Louis B. Boudin, "Recall Berger," pp. 229–232.
- Louis B. Boudin, "Strategy and Conscience," pp. 233–236.
- Karl Kautsky, "The Bolsheviki Rising," pp. 237–241.
- The Survey: "The British Miners and the War: An Interview with Robert Smillie," pp. 241–248.

Vol. 2, no. 3 (May–June 1918)

- Karl Marx, "The Divine Right of the Hohenzollern," Introduction by Franz Mehring, pp. 249–259.
- Ludwig Lore, "Karl Marx," pp. 260–270.
- Herman Schlueter, "Karl Marx and the International," pp. 271–288.
- James Oneal, "The New 'Americanism,'" pp. 289–295.
- Hans Block, "Pontius Pilate Scheidemann," pp. 296–297.
- Santeri Nuorteva, "The Rape of Finland's Labor Republic," pp. 298–304.
- N. Lenin, "The 'Disarmament' Cry," pp. 305–316.
- A.V. Lunacharsky, "Appeal by People's Commissary of Education," pp. 317–322.
- John J. Kallen, "The Biology of Peace and War," pp. 323–333.
- Louis B. Boudin, "A War Anniversary," pp. 334–338.
- Louis B. Boudin, "St. Louis — One Year After," pp. 338–341.
- Ludwig Lore, "Freedom of Thought and Speech," pp. 341–345.
- Louis B. Boudin, "Foch and Siberia: A Contrast," pp. 345–351.
- Louis B. Boudin, "War Maps and 'Liberalism,'" pp. 351–354.
- Ludwig Lore, "Toward the Revolution," pp. 354–357.
- "Documents for Future Socialist History," pp. 358–375.

Vol. 2, no. 4 (September–October 1918)

- Ludwig Lore, "The IWW Trial," pp. 377–383.
- Maxim Litvinov, "Soviet Russia Speaks to Britain," pp. 384–387.
- Sen Katayama, "Armed Peace on the Pacific," pp. 388–404.
- N. Lenin, "The Chief Task of Our Day," pp. 405–409.
- Louis C. Fraina, "Laborism and Socialism," pp. 410–431.
- Santeri Nuorteva, "An Open Letter to American Liberals," pp. 432–454. —Reprinted as a pamphlet
- "Reconstruction in Russia," pp. 455–491.
- Louis C. Fraina, "The Prospects of Peace," pp. 492–499.
- Ludwig Lore, "Spargo, Simons and Private Kopelin," pp. 500–504.
- Louis C. Fraina, "The AF of L Labor Mission," pp. 504–507.
- Ludwig Lore, "Progress Backward," pp. 507–512.
- Louis C. Fraina, "Imperialism in Action," pp. 512–520.
- Special Publication: One Year of Revolution: Celebrating the First Anniversary of the Founding of the Russian Revolution.

Vol. 2, no. 5 (December 1918)

- N. Lenin, "A Letter to American Workingmen," pp. 521–533. — reprinted as a pamphlet, see above
- William J. Fielding, "Bridging the Gap of State Socialism," pp. 534–541.
- Leon Trotsky, "In British Captivity," pp. 542–555.
- Z. Höglund, "A Finnish Document," pp. 556–559.
- Victor Adler, "The Awakening of Austria," pp. 560–572.
- Karl Marx, Friedrich Engels, Paul Lafargue, F. Lessner, "A Letter to the Polish Socialists," pp. 573–575.
- Ludwig Lore, "New Germany," pp. 576–591.
- Maxim Gorki, "In the Torrent of the Revolution," pp. 592–599.
- Sen Katayama, "A Japanese Interpretation of the Recent Food Riots," pp. 600–606.
- Maurice Blumlein, "Economic and Menshevik Determinism," pp. 607–616.
- Ludwig Lore, "The Bubble Has Burst," pp. 617–619.
- Ludwig Lore, "The Elections," pp. 619–622.
- Ludwig Lore, "Eugene V. Debs," pp. 622–624.
- Ludwig Lore, "The Red Flag," pp. 625–627.
- Ludwig Lore, "One Measure for All," pp. 628–630.
- Ludwig Lore, "'Our' Peace Delegates," pp. 630–632.
- Ludwig Lore, "Victor Adler," pp. 632–633.
- "Documents," pp. 634–640.

Vol. 3, no. 1 (February 1919)

- Eugene V. Debs, "The Day of the People," pp. 1–4.
- Nikolai Lenin, "The State and Revolution," pp. 5–22.
- Karl Island, "Lenin versus Wilson," pp. 23–26.
- Louis C. Fraina, "Problems of American Socialism," pp. 26–47.
- Ludwig Lore, "Karl Liebknecht and Rosa Luxemburg," pp. 47–64.
- A. Dreifuss, "The Labor Party," pp. 64–67.
- Franz Mehring, "Karl Marx," pp. 68–75.
- Maurice Blumlein, "Economic and Menshevik Determinism," pp. 76–87.
- Leon Trotsky, "The Principles of Democracy and Proletarian Dictatorship," pp. 88–91.
- Karl Kautsky, "The National Constituent Assembly," pp. 91–94.
- Ludwig Lore, "'A World Safe for Democracy,'" pp. 95–97.
- Louis C. Fraina, "The Crime of Crimes," pp. 97–101.
- Louis C. Fraina, "Mexico and American Imperialism," pp. 101–105.
- Ludwig Lore, "Franz Mehring," pp. 106–109.
- Ludwig Lore, "The Constitutional National Assembly," pp. 109–110.
- Edward Lindgren, "What is the 'Left Wing' Movement and Its Purpose?" pp. 111–114.
- "The Communist Propaganda League of Chicago," pp. 114–115.
- "Documents," pp. 116–127.

Vol. 3, no. 2 (May 1919)

- Ludwig Lore, "The First of May, 1919," pp. 129–131.
- N. Bukharin, "Church and School in the Soviet Republic," pp. 131–139.
- August Strindberg, "What the Under-Class Answers to the Most Impressive Phrases of the Upper Class," pp. 139–144.
- M. Philips Price, "The Truth About the Allied Intervention in Russia," pp. 145–154.
- Ludwig Lore, "Berne — A Post-Mortem Conference," pp. 155–162.
- Maxim Gorky, "Russian Tale," pp. 162–165.
- Sen Katayama, "Japan and China," pp. 165–172.
- Nikolai Lenin, " Can the Exploited and Exploiter be Equals?" pp. 172–178.
- Maurice Sugar, "Socialism and the League of Nations," pp. 178–187.
- Charles Rappaport, "The Logic of Insanity," pp. 187–192.
- Franz Mehring, "An Unusual Friendship," pp. 192–200.
- André A. Courland, "Bankruptcy or Revolution — Which?" pp. 200–208.
- "Manifesto and Program of the 'Left Wing' Section, Socialist Party, Local Greater New York," pp. 209–216.
- Ludwig Lore, "Communism in Hungary," pp. 217–225.
- Louis C. Fraina, "The Left Wing," pp. 225–229.
- Ludwig Lore, "Eugene V. Debs, a Revolutionist," pp. 229–231.
- Ludwig Lore, "The Representative of a Free Working Class," pp. 231–232.
- Louis C. Fraina, "Mass Strikes," pp. 233–235.
- Ludwig Lore, "Archangel, A Hopeful Sign," pp. 235–236.
- "Documents," pp. 237–255.

Vol. 3, no. 4 (August 1919)

- Ludwig Lore, "Left or Right?" pp. 257–264.
- Rosa Luxemburg, "What is Bolshevism?" pp. 265–268.
- Max Bedacht, "Radicalism in California," pp. 268–271.
- Karl Radek, "The Development of Socialism from Science into Action," pp. 272–295.
- S.J. Rutgers, "Greetings from Soviet Russia," pp. 295–300.
- August Stringberg, "Autumn Slush," pp. 300–304.
- Max Eastman, "The SLP," pp. 304–306.
- A.S. Sachs, "Russia and Germany," pp. 306–318.
- "Documents," pp. 319–333.
- Ludwig Lore, "The Lusk Fishing Expedition," pp. 334–336.
- S.D., "The Railroad Situation," pp. 336–339.
- Editors: "The Negro Problem — A Labor Problem," pp. 339–341.
- Editors: "Socialist Germany and the Peace," pp. 341–344.
- Ludwig Lore, "The First Victim of the League of Nations," pp. 344–346.
- Ludwig Lore, "The National Convention," pp. 346–348.
- N. Lenin, "On the Unhappy Peace," pp. 348–352.

Vol. 3, no. 3 (November 1919) Published by the Communist Labor Party

- Communist Labor Party: "Hands Off Russia! A Call to the American Working Class," pp. 354–355.
- Ludwig Lore, "Two Years of Soviet Russia," pp. 355–365.
- Leon Trotsky, "Work, Discipline, and Order to Save the Socialist Soviet Republic," pp. 366–382.
- A.S. Sachs, "The Invincible Power of the Russian Revolution," pp. 382–386.
- Rosa Luxemburg, "Oh! How German is this Revolution!" pp. 386–389.
- William Bross Lloyd, "Convention Impressions," pp. 389–394.
- Karl Marx, "Concerning the Jewish Question," pp. 395–406.
- A. Bilan, "The Twilight of Leadership," pp. 406–408.
- N. Lenin, "The Military Program of the Proletarian Revolution," pp. 409–413.
- Clara Zetkin, "Rosa Luxemburg — Her Fight Against the German Betrayers of International Socialism," pp. 414–424.
- "Documents," pp. 425–436.
- Ludwig Lore, "The Communist Labor Party," pp. 438–443.
- M.B., "The Dynamic Class Struggle," pp. 443–445.
- Ludwig Lore, "One Year German Revolution," pp. 445–448.

== See also ==
- Left Wing Section
- Socialist Party of America
- Communist Party of America
