= Fannie Jacobs =

Socialist and women's rights activist (b. 1885, d. 1977)

- Born: November 1, 1885; Russian Empire
- Died: July 6, 1977 (aged 91); Miami, Florida, U.S.
- Other name: Cele Berney
- Occupation: Women's rights activist
- Years active: 1918–1919
- Known for: 1918 and 1919 run for New York State Assembly
- Political party: Socialist; Communist Labor
- Spouse: Ralph M. Jacobs (m. 1902)
- Children: 3

Fannie Jacobs (November 1, 1885 – July 6, 1977), also known as Cele Berney, was an American women's rights and organized labor activist who ran unsuccessfully for the New York State Assembly in 1918 and 1919.

Fannie was a nickname and Jacobs was her married name.

== Early life ==
Jacobs was born in Russia on November 1, 1885. In 1891, when she was four or five, her family immigrated to the United States, settling in Brooklyn, New York.

Jacobs spoke Yiddish along with English. By 1917, she was secretary of the Bronx branch of the National Consumers League.

== 1918 and 1919 Run for New York State Assembly ==
In 1918, Fannie ran as a Socialist Party candidate for the State Assembly. During her campaign, she gave the speech "Women-Past, Present, and Future" to an overflow crowd. She was defeated.

In 1919, Jacobs once again ran for the State Assembly in the Socialist primaries, affiliated with the Left Wing Section of the Socialist Party and the Communist Labor Party. When election officials first counted the results, she had won the nomination, but during the recount she was found to have lost.

On December 9, 1919, at a Communist Labor Party meeting in Brooklyn, Jacobs gave a speech in which she advocated for the rights of the working class. She denounced capitalists' interventions against political organizing among workers, saying that "if ever you try to change the conditions under which you live, so that it is in the interest of the working class, you will find that American capitalist dictatorship more brutal than that of Czarist Russia".

== Later life and death ==
Jacobs later joined the Communist Party of America, serving as director of a workers' education school in Middle Village, Queens. She was active in the party as late as 1932. Around 1935, Jacobs began to call herself Cele Berney, and continued to support left-wing causes, chairing a WPA grievance committee and calling for a boycott of goods from the Japanese Empire. She moved to Miami, Florida around 1973, where she died on July 6, 1977, in Miami, Florida.

== Personal life ==
In 1902, she married Ralph M. Jacobs. They had three children:

- Arthur S. Jacobs (b. 1903)
- Lillian Jacobs (b. 1906), who married a Mr. Levitch
- Theodore Jacobs (b. 1911)
