= S. J. Rutgers =

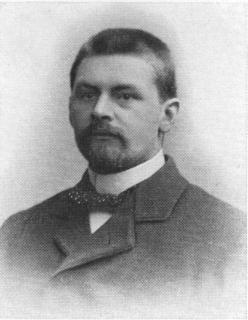
Rutgers in 1902

Sebald Justinus Rutgers (25 January 1879 – 14 June 1961) was a Dutch-American Marxist theoretician and journalist who played an important role in the Left Wing Section of the Socialist Party of America. He was also a construction engineer who was active in building industry in the Soviet Union.

== Biography ==
=== Early years ===
S. J. Rutgers was born in Leiden, Netherlands on January 25, 1879 in the family of the progressive minister and physician Jan Rutgers. He studied from 1896 to the Polytechnical School of Delft, where he came into contact with socialism. In 1900 he graduated as a civil engineer and took a job for the municipality of Rotterdam, where he worked on the expansion of the port. At the same time, he was active from 1899 in the Social Democratic Workers' Party (SDAP). From 1911 to 1915 he was director of public works in Medan, and then buyer for Dutch East Indian companies in the United States.

=== Political activities ===
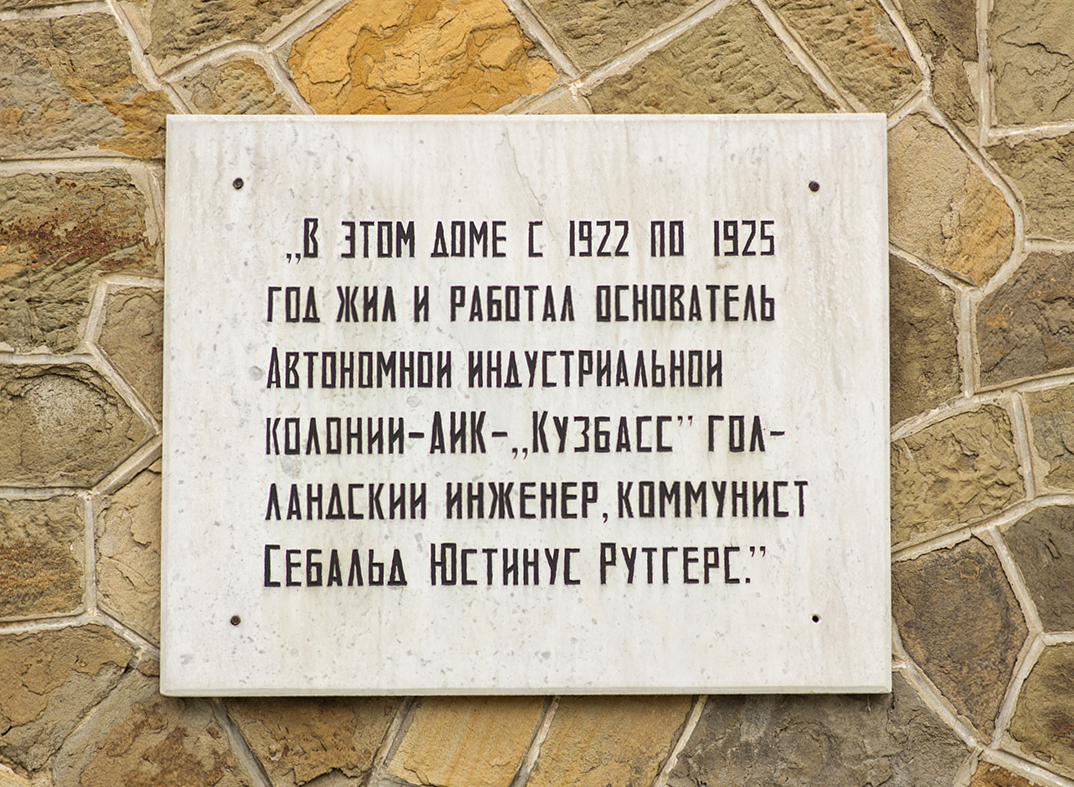
A plaque on the 1922–1925 home of Rutgers in Kemerovo, noting him as an engineer and founder of the Kuzbass Autonomous Industrial Colony

During World War I, Rutgers was a frequent contributor to the Left Wing socialist press in America. His influential articles in The International Socialist Review and other publications supported the antimilitarist Zimmerwald Left movement and helped publicize the ideas of revolutionary socialism to an American audience. Rutgers was the financial force behind the establishment of a group called the Socialist Propaganda League of America in 1915, a revolutionary socialist forerunner of the Communist Party of America (CPA).

Rutgers was subsequently regarded as one of the leading theoreticians of the Left Wing of the Socialist Party of America, a tendency which emerged as the CPA after 1919.

After the Bolshevik Revolution of 1917, Rutgers made his way to Soviet Russia via Vladivostok and Japan. Having transversed the war zone of the Russian Civil War, he arrived in Moscow whereupon he was invited to meet with Lenin in the Kremlin. He attended the First Congress of the Communist International. When the Comintern established its Amsterdam Bureau, Rutgers was appointed secretary and given the major portion of twenty million roubles – in the form of precious stones – with which to found this bureau.

From 1922–1926, he led the construction of an international workers cooperative, the Kuzbass Autonomous Industrial Colony in the Kuzbas area of Siberia. From 1930 to 1938 he worked as a consultant on the examination of large construction projects in as member of the board for foreign specialists at the Rabkrin. He was also a member of the editorial board of the Soviet English-language newspaper Moskovskiye Novosti. In 1938, Rutgers left the Soviet Union.

Back in the Netherlands, Rutgers became an active member of the Dutch resistance during the Second World War. After the liberation, he lived out his life as a respected, but non-influential member of the Communist Party of the Netherlands.

=== Death and legacy ===
Sebald Rutgers died in Amersfoort, Netherlands on June 14, 1961.

A small collection of Rutgers' papers resides at the International Institute of Social History in Amsterdam.

== Works ==
- "The Left Wing: Mass Action and Mass Democracy," International Socialist Review, vol. 17, no. 5 (November 1916), pp. 301–303.
- "The Left Wing: An Actual Beginning," International Socialist Review, vol. 17, no. 6 (December 1916), pp. 365–366.
- "Mass Action in Russia," International Socialist Review, vol. 17, no. 7 (January 1917), pp. 410–413.
- "The Future of International Socialism," International Socialist Review, vol. 17, no. 9 (March 1917), pp. 550–551.
- "Letter from Karl Liebknecht," International Socialist Review, vol. 17, no. 10 (April 1917), pp. 610–612.
- "Our Action Against Conscription," International Socialist Review, vol. 17, no. 11 (May 1917), pp. 721–722.
- "Introduction to the History of the Labor Movement in Japan," International Socialist Review, vol. 18, no. 1 (July 1917), pp. 37–38.
- "World Policies," International Socialist Review, vol. 18, no. 3 (September 1917), pp. 172–173.
- "Letter to Oakley C. Johnson in NYC from S.J. Rutgers in Amersfoort, Holland, April 21, 1958," C.E. Ruthenberg Papers, Ohio Historical Society, Box 14, Folder 4, Microfilm reel 8. Corvallis, OR: 1000 Flowers Publishing, 2012.
