= Isaac Edward Ferguson =

American lawyer

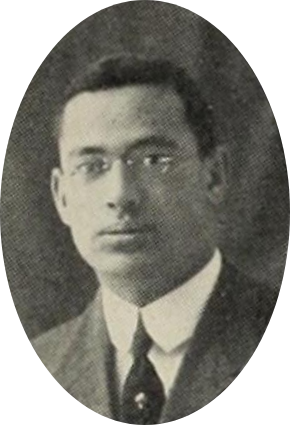
Ferguson's University of Chicago yearbook photo, 1910

Isaac Edward "Ed" Ferguson (November 23, 1888 – February 11, 1964) was a Canadian-born American lawyer and political activist. A founding member of the Communist Party of America, Ferguson is best remembered a co-defendant and attorney in a highly publicized 1920 trial together with party leader C. E. Ruthenberg for alleged violation of New York state law against so-called "criminal anarchism." Following conviction and a term served at Sing Sing prison, Ferguson withdrew from radical politics to become a prominent Chicago civil rights attorney.

== Biography ==
=== Early years ===
Isaac Edward Ferguson, known to his friends as "Ed," was born November 23, 1888, in Winnipeg, Manitoba, Canada, the son of an Orthodox Jewish rabbi. Ferguson moved to the United States of America as a boy. In 1905 he was on an AA registered basketball team with his four older brothers. He graduated from McKinley High School in 1906. He attended the University of Chicago, from which he graduated with a Bachelor's degree in 1910 and a Juris Doctor degree in 1912. During his time at the University of Chicago, Ferguson briefly became involved in radical politics, leaving the socialist movement upon graduation.

After graduation Ferguson spent four years in the Western state of Wyoming, where he ran for county attorney as a Republican.

=== Political career ===
Ferguson returned to Chicago in 1918 to take a position as a personal secretary to William Bross Lloyd, a millionaire heir to the Chicago Tribune fortune who was running for United States Senate on the ticket of the Socialist Party of America in the November 1918 election. Ferguson himself joined the Socialist Party at this time. Ferguson and Lloyd together felt an affinity for a revolutionary socialist political program and were instrumental in launching the Communist Propaganda League in Chicago — one of the first explicitly Bolshevik political organizations in the United States.

Ferguson was early in casting his allegiance to the Left Wing Section of the Socialist Party when it emerged early in 1919 and was a delegate to the faction's National Conference of the Left Wing in New York City in June 1919. That gathering elected Ferguson as National Secretary of the Left Wing, a position which he formally retained until the establishment of the Communist Party of America (CPA) early in September.

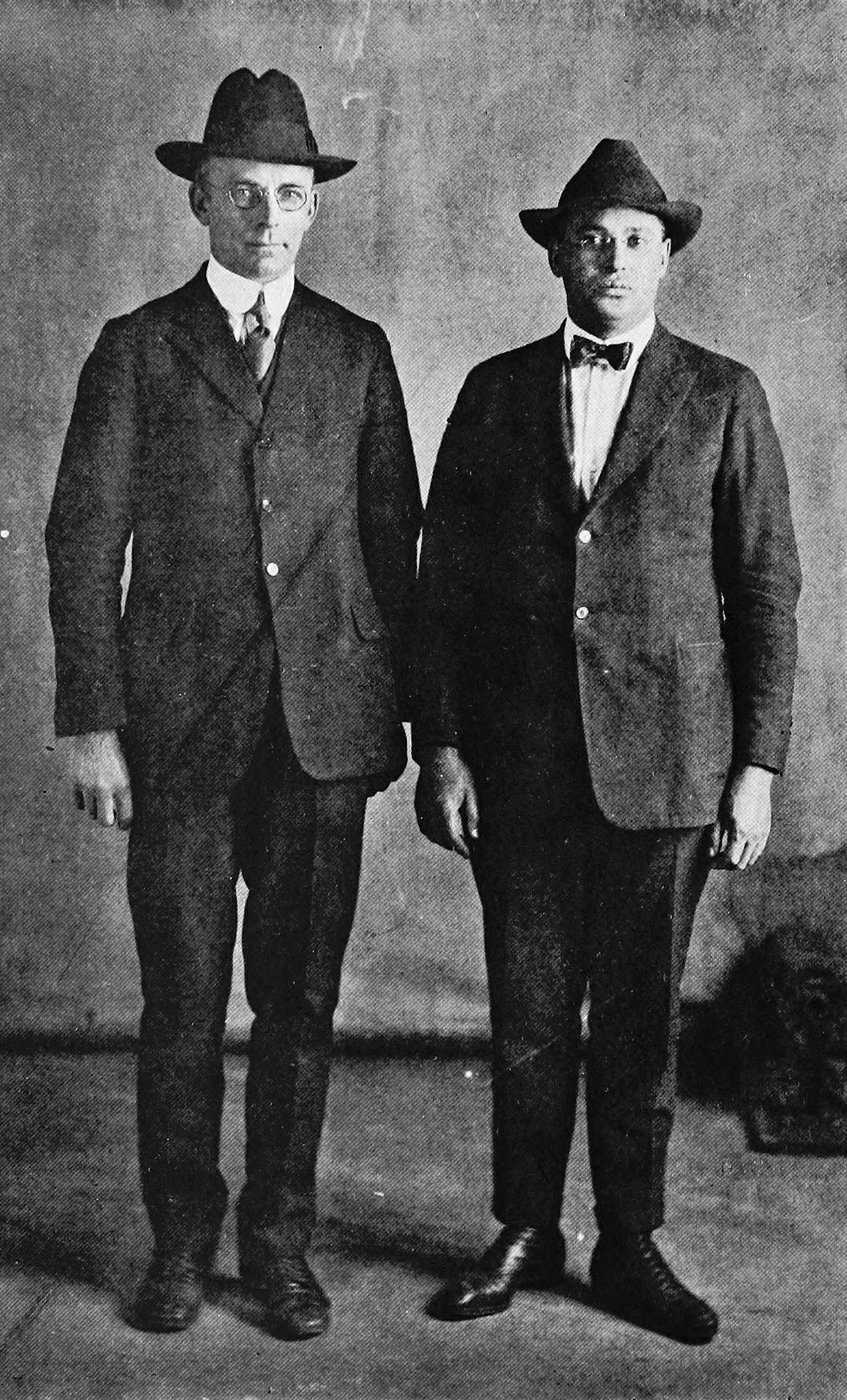
Ferguson (right) with C. E. Ruthenberg c. 1920

Ferguson joined his co-thinker, Cleveland Socialist Party leader C. E. Ruthenberg, as a charter member of the CPA and attended its founding convention in Chicago. He was elected the governing Central Executive Committee of the CPA and served on that body until leaving with Ruthenberg and his faction to join with the rival Communist Labor Party of America in establishing the United Communist Party of America at a secret convention held at the end of May 1920 in Bridgman, Michigan.

As a radical attorney, Ferguson did legal defense work in a number of high-profile political cases of the World War I period and after, including work on the appeals of convicted Socialist Party of America leaders Eugene V. Debs and Rose Pastor Stokes in 1918 as well as primary work on the case of New Jersey Communist Party leader Walter Gabriel in 1920.

=== The Ruthenberg-Ferguson case ===
Ferguson was arrested in New York City, headquarters city of the Communist Party along with CPA Executive Secretary C.E. Ruthenberg on December 1, 1919. The pair were charged with violation of a previously unused 1902 New York law prohibiting the advocacy of "Criminal Anarchism," which had been passed in the aftermath of the assassination of President William McKinley. This law had made it a felony to advocate that "government should be overthrown by force or violence...or by any illegal means."

Following a precedent set in a recent conviction of Irish radical James Larkin, it was alleged that through their membership on the National Council of the Left Wing, Ferguson and Ruthenberg had been responsible for the publication of an iteration of the Left Wing Manifesto, published in the official organ of the Left Wing Section, The Revolutionary Age, on July 5, 1919.

The trial began in New York City on October 6, 1920, with Ferguson acting in the role of defense attorney for both defendants. Following a trial the pair were convicted on October 29 and immediately sentenced to a term of 5 years imprisonment. Ferguson and Ruthenberg were immediately jailed in The Tombs before being incarcerated at Sing Sing Prison at Ossining, New York. The pair would remain behind bars for approximately 18 months.

Released on bail pending appeal, the case was eventually reversed by the New York Court of Appeals in July 1922. It was the lack of proof of close ties between the two defendants and the publication of the Left Wing Manifesto that was the ultimate reason for the reversal.

=== Legal career ===
Following his release from prison, Ferguson dropped out of direct political activity to concentrate on working as a lawyer full-time. Ferguson worked on the cases associated with the raided 1922 Bridgman Convention of the Communist Party and on criminal syndicalism cases in the state of Pennsylvania in 1924.

=== Death and legacy ===
Ferguson died on February 11, 1964. He was 75 years old at the time of his death.

== Works ==
- "The Political Prisoners at Dannemora: Report of Their Attorney," The Communist (UCP), vol. 1, no. 6 (Circa August 1920), pg. 8.
- A Communist Trial: Extracts from the Testimony of C.E. Ruthenberg and Closing Address to the Jury by Isaac E. Ferguson. New York: National Defense Committee, n.d. [1920].

== Sources ==
- U.S. Supreme Court Transcript of Record: Ruthenberg v. People of State of Michigan. (1926) Gale, 2011.
- Chicago Tribune Sunday Tribune February 12, 1905
