= 1919 Emergency National Convention =

Socialist National Convention
Convention
- Dates: Aug 30–Sep 5, 1919
- City: Chicago, Illinois

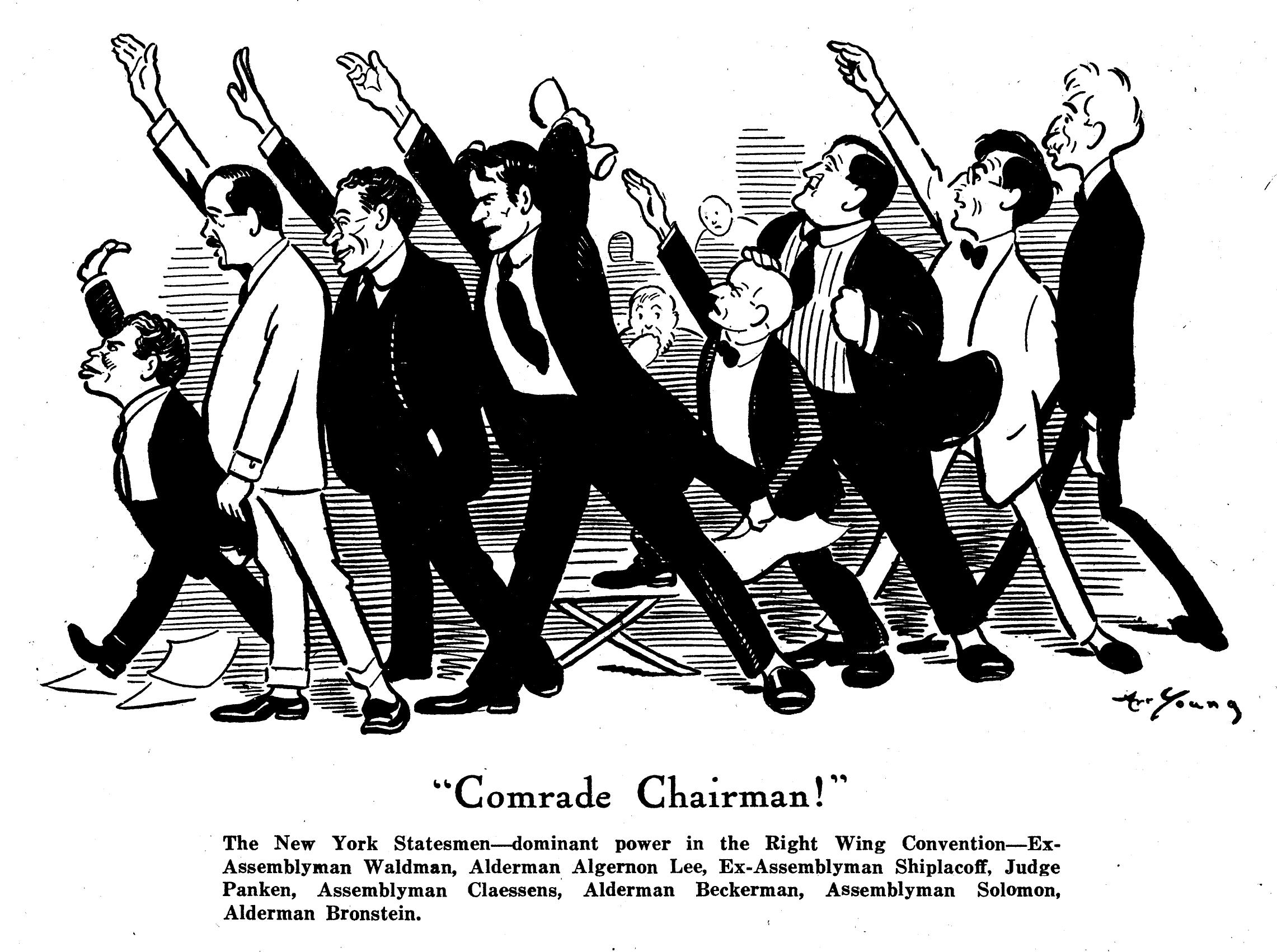
"Comrade Chairman!" Cartoon by Art Young depicting the New York Old Guard at the 1919 Emergency National Convention of the SPA. Left to right: Louis Waldman, Algernon Lee, Abraham Shiplacoff, Jacob Panken, August Claessens, Abraham Beckerman, Charles Solomon, and Alexander Braunstein.

The 1919 Emergency National Convention of the Socialist Party of America was held in Chicago from August 30 to September 5, 1919. It was a seminal gathering in the history of American radicalism, marked by the bolting of the party's organized left wing to establish the Communist Labor Party of America.

== History ==
The 1919 Emergency Convention was convened in response to pressure from the organized Left Wing Section of the Socialist Party, which originally sought the convention to solidify the SPA's position towards the socialist revolution in Russia. Instead, the gathering wound up being the nexus of the great showdown between the party Regulars, headed by National Executive Secretary Adolph Germer, National Executive Committee member James Oneal, and New York State Secretary Julius Gerber, and the Left Wing Section, headed by Alfred Wagenknecht and L.E. Katterfeld. Although initially slated to be attended by 200 delegates, a list of just 117 credentialed delegates from 22 states was published in the press.

The opening remarks to the convention were made by Executive Secretary Adolph Germer, who declared that disagreement over tactics was only one part of the ongoing factional controversy in the SPA: "I always believed that this factional division leads to healthy methods, provided it is not carried to the extent where the organization is torn into parts and shreds, and leaves us an easy prey to our common enemy."

The second part of the crisis, according to Germer, was the thick blanket of "personal slanders and conspiracies against individuals that have been engaged in for no other reason than to break down the confidence of the membership" in the party's elected leadership. The Left Wing critics of the NEC and the Germer administration offered "no specific statements, but general gossip, rumor, suggestion, innuendo," he declared.

The first order of business at the convention was the election of a chairman of the day, a post handily won by Regular Seymour Stedman over Left Winger Joseph Coldwell of Rhode Island, by a tally of 88-37. Upon his election, Stedman delivered the traditional keynote speech to the convention. Stedman reviewed the history of the previous 5 years of war and controversy and detailed the factional controversy in the party, judging the split of the Socialist Party to have been an accomplished fact from the moment of the opening gavel.

There was little, if any, drama, about the ultimate outcome of the convention based upon the composition of the delegation, which had been effectively packed by the party's "regulars" while the dissident left wingers split over the question of tactics. The Left Wing failure to challenge the seating of the massive New York delegation and the handpicked delegation from "reorganized" Massachusetts proved decisive. In particular, the recommendation of Jacob Panken's Credentials Committee on Aug. 31 to seat an alternate slate from the state of Minnesota rather than the slate of delegates elected by the party members of that state in referendum was the cause of a protracted and interesting debate, which touched upon the major questions of philosophy and legality. Ultimately, the elected Minnesota delegation, which refused to accept its seats in any event, was not seated in favor of the slate appointed by the (Regular) State Executive Committee, which was granted voice but not vote at the convention.

A report by a special investigating committee appointed by the National Executive Committee, detailing an extensive list of irregularities and illegalities said to have been systematically perpetrated by several of the suspended language federations, was unanimously received by the convention, setting aside the results of the 1919 party election except for a referendum calling for the SPA to affiliate with the Communist International in Moscow, the passage of which by a margin of over 6-to-1 had precluded any possibility of fraudulent passage. The initiative was declared adopted by the convention when it approved the committee report.

Upon receiving a supplemental report of the National Executive Committee detailing its actions from May until August 1919, the convention predictably ratified the action of the outgoing NEC in abrogating the 1919 party election, suspending the 7 dissident language federations and decertifying (and thus expelling) the state organizations of Michigan, Massachusetts, and Ohio. Some criticism was levied of the NEC for its failure to appeal to the membership of the suspended and expelled organizations to rejoin the organization.

At the 1919 Emergency Convention, the SPA's Constitution was substantially changed. Henceforth, the Constitution mandated for annual National Conventions to be held to elect the members of the governing National Executive Committee, which would henceforth consist of not 15 members but 7. A new Board of Appeals to handle appeals of actions of the NEC was added. The changes made to the SPA's constitution were later submitted to the membership by referendum and ratified.

A rather imaginative rendition of the 1919 Emergency National Convention appears in the 1981 Warren Beatty film, Reds.
