= Julius Gerber =

American socialist (1872–1956)

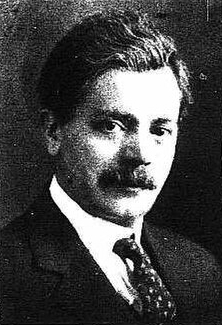
Gerber c. 1931

Julius Gerber (born Israel Getzel Gerber; December 24, 1872 – July 16, 1956) was a leading functionary and politician in the Socialist Party of America during the first two decades of the 20th century. Gerber headed the party's important New York City branch and its environs from 1911 through 1922. He played a key role in the party split of 1919, out of which the Communist Party emerged.

== Biography ==
=== Early years ===
Gerber was born on December 24, 1872, in Riga, Governorate of Livonia, Russian Empire. His father was a tradesman. The Gerbers were Jewish, and as members of a persecuted minority, the family fled Tsarist Russia in 1886, landing in New York. Young Julius took a job as a sheet metal worker at the age of 14, a task at which he remained until 1911. He was a member of the Amalgamated Metal Workers Union. There is no record substantiating Julius Gerber arrived in the United States with any family member. According to his United States passport applications of 1928 and 1931, he arrived in the country in either September 1887 or August 1888 at the age of 16 or 17. He applied for and was granted American citizenship on October 27, 1893, in Kings County, New York.

Gerber was a committed socialist from an early age, joining the Socialist Labor Party of America (SLP) in 1890.

In the bitter 1899 split of the SLP, Gerber allied himself with the pro-American Federation of Labor insurgents headed by Henry Slobodin and Morris Hillquit against the regular faction of Daniel DeLeon and Henry Kuhn. Julius was made the organizer of Local New York of the new organization, a group calling themselves the Social Democratic Party after the DeLeon-Kuhn faction won control of the party name and logo as the result of a lawsuit. In August 1901 this Eastern SDP group united with a Midwestern group of the same name to establish the Socialist Party of America. Gerber was elected as the first Secretary of Local New York SPA following formation of the new organization.

Gerber remained on as organizer of Local Greater New York for this enlarged organization through 1902.

Gerber was active in the publishing group which issued the socialist New Yorker Volkszeitung and served as Financial Secretary of that organization. He was also Secretary of the Press Committee which established the English-language New York Daily Call a few years later.

Gerber was a frequent participant at the national conventions of the Socialist Party which determined party policy, attending the 1900, 1904, 1908, and 1912 gatherings.

=== Party functionary ===
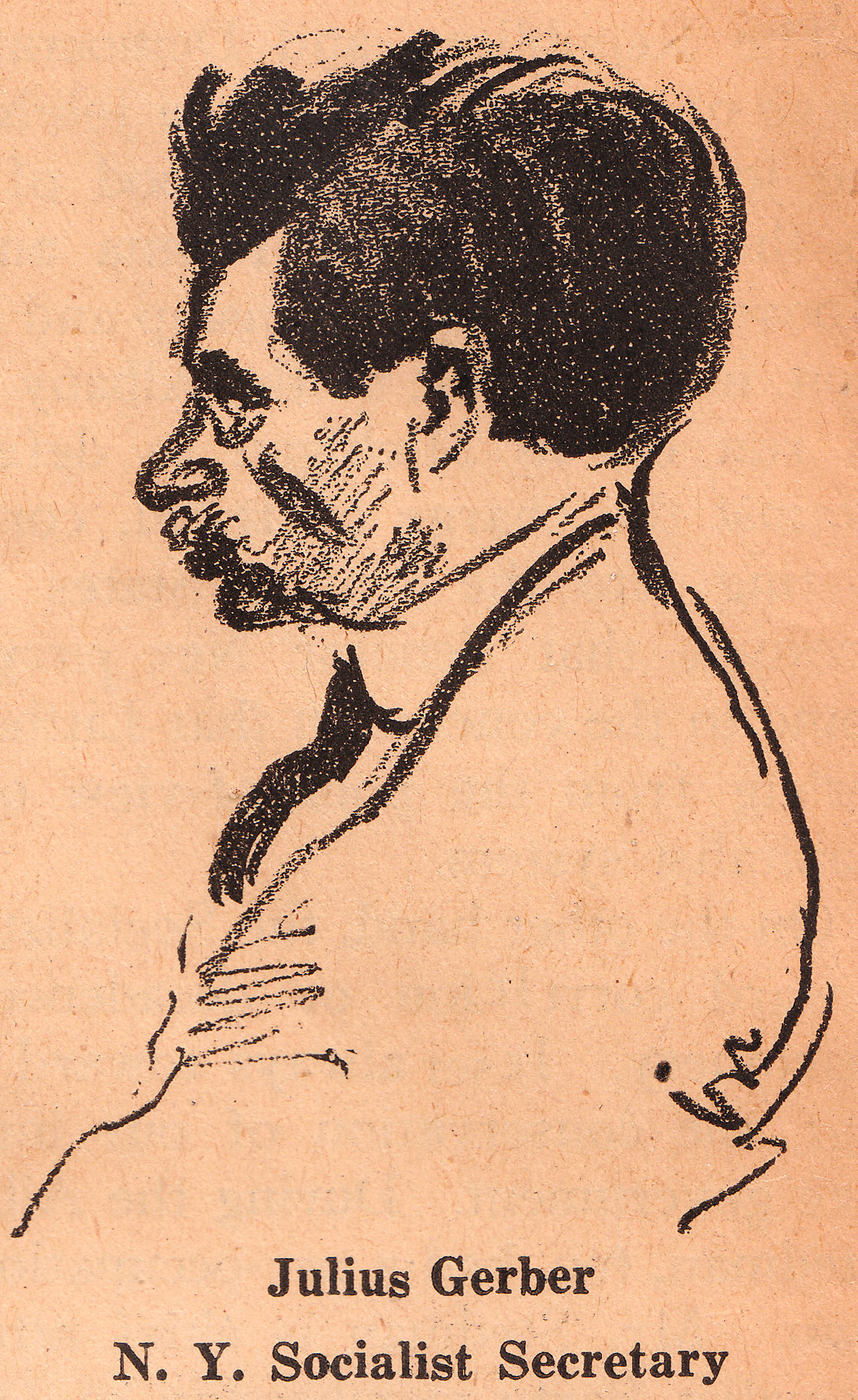
Julius Gerber, as drawn by Robert Minor in The Liberator, January 1920.

Gerber worked as the organizer of Local Kings County from 1908 to 1909, before being elected Executive Secretary of Local Greater New York in February 1911. Gerber remained in this full-time, paid position for over a decade, standing down only in 1922, probably due to the Socialist Party's declining financial fortunes. Thereafter, Gerber paid the rent through his work as a printing salesman.

Julius was a delegate to the 1917 Socialist Party Convention, a gathering which passed the aggressively anti-militarist St. Louis Manifesto.

In addition to his regular party tasks, Gerber was the Secretary of the Workingmen's Cooperative Publishing Association, the group responsible for publication of the New York Call, one of just two Socialist Party English language daily newspapers during the decade of the 1910s.

Gerber sat on the State Executive Committee of the Socialist Party of New York in 1919, a group which conducted a factional war on behalf of the party regulars against the Left Wing Section of the Socialist Party. He was a delegate to the seminal 1919 Socialist Party Convention, which led to the split of the party's Left Wing to form the Communist Labor Party of America.

Gerber was elected to the governing National Executive Committee of the Socialist Party in 1921, serving a one-year term. He ran for New York State Assembly in that same year, standing in the 18th Assembly District.

Following the demise of the New York Call in 1923, Gerber became actively involved with its successor publication, The New Leader. He was the Secretary of the New Leader Publishing Association, the group which published the paper, from its establishment in 1924.

Gerber split along with other "Old Guard" members to form the Social Democratic Federation beginning in 1936–1937. He was an active participant in one of the SDF's early planning conferences.

Gerber was strictly a party functionary rather than an agitator or a theoretician and did not publish any books or pamphlets in his lifetime.

=== Personal life and death ===
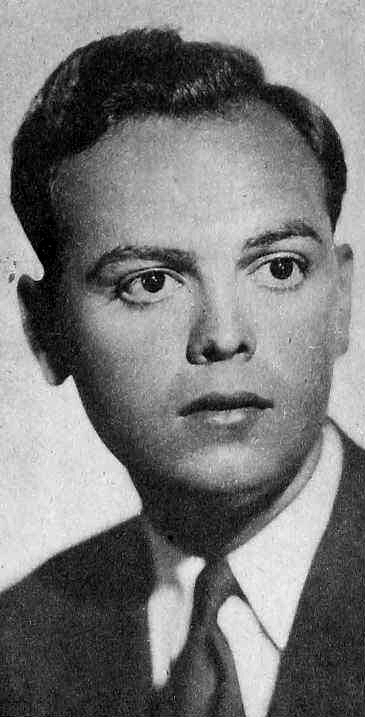
Gerber's youngest son Ludwig as an American Labor Party candidate for judge of the New York City Municipal Court, 1939

Gerber married Lena Sacht in New York on February 13, 1892, according to their marriage license. They had five sons and three daughters, the youngest of whom was Ludwig Hillquit Gerber. Named for Gerber's colleague Morris Hillquit, Ludwig was an attorney and film production executive who served as secretary to the borough of Brooklyn under borough president Raymond V. Ingersoll and as western regional administrator of the Veterans' Administration after World War II.

Gerber died in his Brooklyn home on July 16, 1956.

== Legacy ==
Gerber was portrayed by William Daniels in Warren Beatty's 1981 historical drama Reds.
