= L. E. Katterfeld =

American socialist politician (1881–1974)

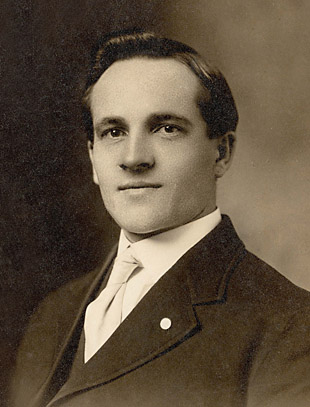
L. E. Katterfeld in 1909.

Ludwig Erwin Alfred "Dutch" Katterfeld (15 July 1881 – 11 December 1974) was an American socialist politician, a founding member of the Communist Labor Party of America, a Comintern functionary, and a magazine editor.

== Biography ==
=== Early life ===
L.E. Katterfeld (he seems to have generally used his initials in daily life) was born on July 15, 1881, in Strasbourg, Alsace-Lorraine, then part of the German Empire. He was the eldest of 4 children born to Dr. Alfred Katterfeld, a professor at the University of Strasbourg and Adele Karpinski Katterfeld. L.E.'s mother died when he was 5, shortly after the birth of his twin sisters, and his father remarried but died shortly thereafter. L.E. was sent away alone to live in the United States with a "godfather" in Nebraska at the end of 1892, arriving in New York on January 17, 1893, aboard the steamer Friesland.

Young L.E. worked as a farmhand in harsh rural conditions for several years, running away to Kansas at age 16. He finished at the top of his 8th grade class in Cloud County in 1898, also winning the Kansas state oratorial championship. He went on to finish high school and attended Washburn College in Topeka from 1902 to 1908, while working in a livery stable. While at Washburn College, L.E. met his future wife, Berta Pearl Horn. After graduation, he persuaded Berta to follow him to Chicago, where the pair were married on October 10, 1910.

=== Socialist Party years (1905–1919) ===
Katterfeld was attracted to radical politics from an early age, joining the Socialist Party of America (SPA) in 1905 as a college student. He was elected as a delegate to the 1908 National Convention of the SPA from Kansas. In June 1911 he was named the head of a short-lived Socialist Party "Lyceum Bureau," which coordinated speaking tours by socialist organizers and propagandists, a program which was terminated in 1913.

Katterfeld subsequently moved to Washington state in the Pacific Northwest, a state with a bitterly divided state Socialist Party. On June 18, 1914, in accordance with the wishes of the National Executive Committee of the SPA, a "Unity Conference" joining the bitter factions of the Washington state party was held. The gathering elected Katterfeld as the new State Secretary of the Socialist Party of Washington, a post in which he served through 1915. He was elected by the Socialist Party of Washington as its representative on the Socialist Party's National Committee in 1915 (a body which met annually in a gathering akin to a national convention). The Washington party was long among the country's most radical. There he met future close associates Alfred Wagenknecht and Elmer Allison.

In 1916 the ambitious Katterfeld was a candidate for National Executive Secretary of the Socialist Party, finishing 4th of 4 candidates. He was also the Socialist Party's candidate for Governor of Washington that fall.

In 1917, the Katterfeld family moved back to Kansas, settling in Dighton, where his wife's father owned a 2,000-acre (8.1 km^{2}) farm. He was elected as a delegate from that state to the 1917 Emergency National Convention of the Socialist Party. At the convention, Katterfeld was a strong supporter of the party's vigorously antimilitarist St. Louis resolution against American participation in World War I. He was elected to the National Executive Committee of the Socialist Party in 1918. He left the farm in Kansas to live in Chicago at about this time.

=== Communist Party years (1919–1929) ===
L.E. Katterfeld was a dedicated member of the Left Wing Section of the Socialist Party from its earliest days in 1919. He was one of the Left Wing's endorsed candidates in the 1919 party election for National Executive Committee, the results of which election were overturned by action of the outgoing NEC on which he sat.

Katterfeld was a delegate to the 1919 Emergency National Convention of the Socialist Party on August 30, 1919, and was one of the first to bolt to the previously arranged alternative convention downstairs. After two days, this alternative "Socialist Party" convention organized itself as the Communist Labor Party (CLP). Katterfeld was one of five people elected to the governing Central Executive Committee of the CLP and served as Organization Director from 1919. Katterfeld remained one of the top leaders of the CLP and its organizational successors, the United Communist Party of America and the unified Communist Party of America (CPA) into the middle 1920s.

Katterfeld was a defendant in the July 1920 trial of the Communist Labor Party, at which Clarence Darrow served as chief attorney. Katterfeld was found guilty of violating the state's criminal syndicalism law and sentenced to 1 to 5 years in the state penitentiary and fined $2,000.

Freed pending appeal, Katterfeld did not immediately serve time on this sentence, instead serving as Executive Secretary of the unified Communist Party of America, using the pseudonym "John Carr," from July 27 through October 15, 1921, and which time the Central Executive Committee of the CPA dispatched him to Moscow as the representative of the CPA to the Executive Committee of the Communist International. Katterfeld occupied this position from November 1921 through March 1922. He was elected by the 1st Expanded Plenum of the Executive Committee of the Communist International to the Presidium of ECCI on March 2, 1922.

Back in the United States, Katterfeld was elected by the ill-fated 1922 Bridgman Convention of the CPA once again to the governing National Executive Committee of the party. He also served provisionally as Executive Secretary for the organization for about two weeks at the end of August and into September 1922.

The CEC once again named Katterfeld its representative to the Comintern in Moscow on September 5, 1922, ending his brief stint as party chief. He made his way to Soviet Russia once again, where he served as CI Rep until the first week of December, when he turned over his job to Otto Huiswoud and returned to the United States, due to the needs of his 1920 legal difficulties. Katterfeld was once again elected to ECCI by the 4th World Congress of the Comintern in December 1922.

While he was elected to the Central Executive Committee of the Workers Party of America by the 3rd Convention of that organization at the end of 1923, Katterfeld was at the time in prison at Joliet, Illinois, in connection with his 1920 conviction. He sat one year in prison, assisting with the bookkeeping at the institution.

Katterfeld was the manager of the eastern agency of the Daily Worker Publishing Co. in 1926 and 1927. Whittaker Chambers described in his memoirs at some length:

Katterfeld looked like the type of Communist I had hoped to find on my first visit to the English-speaking branch. He was a German-American, humorless, grave, with a lined, austere face. He had been an unsuccessful Kansas wheat farmer, graduating from a native school of agrarian radicalism. Poverty was a vocation with him. His frayed overcoat was the uniform of his faith, and, like everything else about him, it was of a piece with a revolutionary integrity that shone from him more purely than from almost any other American Communist I knew. He lived in a little house on Long Island in the same woods where I had wandered as a boy, for, like me, he did not like cities. He had a big family of boys and girls, and, when I had come to know him better, he once confided to me with wistful dismay that his children "regarded the Communist Party the way Communists regard capitalism—as a cause of poverty and exploitation." They wanted to live like other people and detested Communists and Communist meetings. During the party's underground days Katterfeld had briefly been the party's acting secretary. But his revolutionary intelligence was not quite up to his revolutionary spirit. Both made him something of a butt for men who were less good and less devout, but brighter. He was an extreme leftist and held that the Communist Party should have remained permanently underground, sensing, I think, that the underground experience inevitably winnowed out men less dedicated than himself, and thus left a core of hardened professional revolutionists. He could not face the fact that Lenin had tirelessly taught that, when a whole Communist party is outlawed, it is almost wholly paralyzed because it can no longer send into the surrounding community the filaments whereby it spreads its toxins and from which it draws its strength and life. That a hard core of devoted men like himself existed was more important to Katterfeld than what they existed for. When the Lovestoneites took power in the party, Katterfeld withdrew from it.

=== Post-Communist years (1927–1974) ===
Cover of the first issue of Katterfeld's Evolution, December 1927.

The scientific theory of evolution was a hot-button political issue during the decade of the 1920s, fueled by the sensational "Scopes Monkey Trial" of July 1925. In December 1927, Katterfeld launched a new magazine published in New York City called Evolution, at which he worked as managing editor. The publication's initial issue declared the publication's name was chosen "because the evolutionary concept of man's development is the idea which fundamentalists have seized to build an issue," thus symbolizing "the entire conflict between those who see life through the eyes of science and those who look upon it through the misty superstitions of the past." Katterfeld declared that his new publication would be "non-political, so that all upholders of academic freedom can support and use it no matter how they differ on other issues" as well as "non-religious, never making any effort to reconcile science with religion" while at the same time making no attempt to "make atheism its mission."

The non-political and independent status of Evolution proved to be a problem for Katterfeld with respect to his continued membership in the Communist Party, however. Katterfeld was expelled from the Communist Party early in 1929 in connection with his refusal to relinquish control of this publication to the party.

Evolution was initially a 16-page monthly publication, but the magazine moved to a bimonthly publication schedule in 1929. The magazine was formally a quarterly from 1930 but was in practice published infrequently, with only 6 issues appearing between June 1930 through January 1938.

Contributors to Evolution include both scientific-minded figures from the socialist movement, such as Maynard Shipley, Ernest Untermann, Allan Strong Broms, and V. F. Calverton, leading rationalists like Joseph McCabe, and figures from the academic world, including Harry Elmer Barnes, Federic A. Lucas, and William K. Gregory.

The magazine went on hiatus from May 1932 until publication of the June 1937 issue. Katterfeld spent much of the Great Depression on the road promoting his financially floundering magazine. At the time of the publication's restart, Katterfeld wrote to his readers:

"During the five years since the last issue of Evolution appeared I have canvassed for it in practically every city of over 100,000 in the United States and a great many smaller communities, all the larger colleges and universities, and hundreds of high schools in 45 states and in Canada. In securing over 4,000 subscribers personally I probably talked about Evolution with over 20,000 persons, traveled 30,000 miles by bus and train, walked at least 12,000 miles, and rode an equal distance by street busses and cars. And I am more convinced that there is a need and a real field for Evolution than I was before I started.

"Although I did not succeed in finding an 'angel' for this enterprise, I now feel that through this field-work a sufficient foundation has been laid to justify resuming publication."

An ambitious schedule of 10 issues per year for the rejuvenated publication was planned. The restart proved to be unsuccessful, however, and the publication was terminated effective with its next issue, dated January 1938.

Katterfeld became interested in the cooperative movement in his later years and continued to commute to an office in New York City until he was nearly 90 years old.

=== Death and legacy ===
Katterfeld died in New York state on December 11, 1974.

While he did not leave papers to a university library, in 1956 Katterfeld shared his recollections of the early Communist movement with historian Theodore Draper, then engaged in research on his book The Roots of American Communism, published by the Viking Press in 1957.

== See also ==
- Socialist Party of Washington
