= The Revolutionary Age =

Left-wing newspaper published between 1918 and 1919

Debut issue of The Revolutionary Age, published November 16, 1918.

The Revolutionary Age was an American radical newspaper edited by Louis C. Fraina and published from November 1918 until August 1919. Originally the publication of Local Boston, Socialist Party, the paper evolved into the de facto national organ of the Left Wing Section of the Socialist Party which battled for control of the Socialist Party throughout the spring and summer of 1919. With the establishment of the Left Wing National Council in June 1919, the paper was moved from Boston to New York City gained status as the official voice of the nascent American communist movement. The publication was terminated in August 1919, replaced by the official organ of the new Communist Party of America, a weekly newspaper known as The Communist.

== Publication history ==
=== Background ===
During the decade of the 1910s, Boston was at the time one of the centers of the foreign language federations of the Socialist Party of America — organized groups of immigrants conducting their activities in languages other than English. Many of these foreign language groups, particularly those hailing from the Russian Empire, were deeply inspired by the Marxist revolutionary movement which overthrew the Tsarist regime in 1917. This emerging revolutionary left in the Socialist party sought to advance its ideas through the establishments.

The immediate forerunner of The Revolutionary Age was a newspaper called The New International, issued in New York under the auspices of the Socialist Propaganda League. This paper was launched early in 1917, but ran out of funds by summer, forcing its outright suspension from the middle of July until the start of October 1917. Only a few irregularly appearing issues of The New International were issued after that date due to these ongoing financial concerns, leaving a void for the emergence of a new revolutionary socialist publication.

At the beginning of 1918 revolutionary socialists won majority control of Local Boston, Socialist Party, with the powerful Boston-based Lettish Socialist Federation functioning as the leading center of the movement. The Boston City Committee made the decision to bring New International editor Louis Fraina from New York City to Boston to take charge of party educational work from that center. By the end of the year a new publication had emerged, issued with Local Boston providing financial support and with educational director Fraina at the helm. This publication was known as The Revolutionary Age.

=== Establishment ===
At the time of its November 1918 launch, The Revolutionary Age was scheduled to appear three times a week, although due to financial constraints the papers was never able to come out more than twice each week and it was soon downgraded to more typical weekly status.

Joining Fraina as associate editor was Irish-American radical Eadmonn MacAlpine. Contributing editors included Scott Nearing, John Reed, Ludwig Lore, and Sen Katayama, as well as Nicholas Hourwich and Gregory Weinstein of the Russian Socialist Federation.

The first issue of The Revolutionary Age appeared dated Saturday, November 16, 1918 — less than one week after the formal termination of World War I. The front page of the tabloid newsprint publication was dominated by a banner headline warning against the war's continuation as a military intervention against Soviet Russia. Additional material was dedicated to the ongoing revolution in Germany, thereby assuring that the issue's whole content lived up to the slogan printed on the publication's masthead — "A Chronicle and Interpretation of Events in Europe." Cover price of the paper was 2 cents per issue.

=== Relationship with the Left Wing Section ===
In the aftermath of the meeting of the National Left Wing Conference in New York City late in June 1919, The Revolutionary Age was named the official organ of the Left Wing Section of the Socialist Party. The publication was merged with the organ of the Left Wing Section of Greater New York, The New York Communist and operations were henceforth conducted from an office located at 43 West 29th Street in Manhattan. A new volume of the publication, "Volume 2," was launched in conjunction with the move.

The paper continued to be edited by Louis Fraina, assisted by a managing council of 11. The circulation of the combined publication averaged 16,000 copies a week, according to the report of the Lusk Committee established in 1919 by the New York State Senate to study the activities of the radical movement in that state.

=== Termination and legacy ===
The last issue of The Revolutionary Age appeared on August 23, 1919. The paper was succeeded by the organs of the two new Communist Parties established at Chicago conventions during the first week of September — the Communist Party of America and the Communist Labor Party of America.

The name The Revolutionary Age was used again in 1929 as the title of an American communist newspaper by the so-called Communist Party (Majority Group) headed by Jay Lovestone. The Lovestone group, which including such veterans of the Left Wing Section Benjamin Gitlow and Bertram D. Wolfe, chose to pay homage to the seminal earlier publication by choosing the same name for their own official organ.

== See also ==
- English-language press of the Communist Party USA
- The Class Struggle (magazine)
