= Left Wing Section of the Socialist Party =

Faction of the Socialist Party of America in 1919

- Predecessor: Socialist Propaganda League of America
- Successor: Communist Party of America and the Communist Labor Party of America
- Purpose: Comintern affiliation
- Main organ: The Revolutionary Age
- Parent organization: Socialist Party of America

The Left Wing Section of the Socialist Party was an organized faction within the Socialist Party of America in 1919 which served as the core of the dual communist parties which emerged in the fall of that year—the Communist Party of America and the Communist Labor Party of America.

== History ==
=== Precursors ===
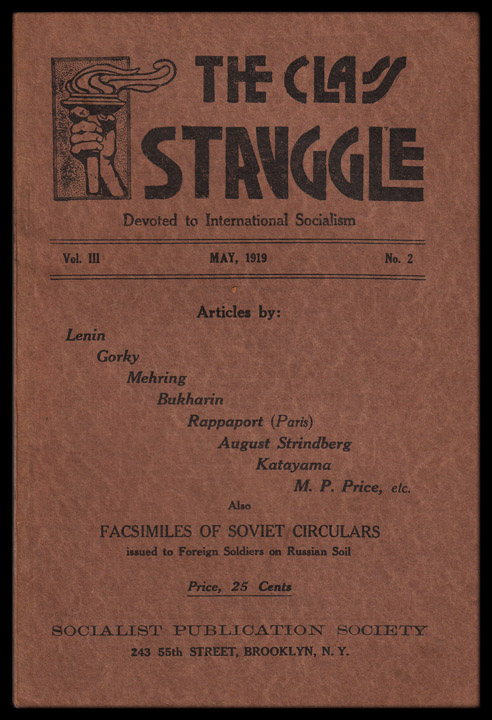
Ludwig Lore's magazine The Class Struggle, established in 1917, was an early theoretical journal of the organized Left Wing in the Socialist Party.

A generalized Left wing had existed prior to 1919, but lacked organizational cohesion. The success of the Bolshevik Revolution in Russia and the end of World War I was an accelerant that made revolutionary socialism an important issue of the day for many in America and around the world.

One important forerunner of the organized Left Wing Section of 1919 was the magazine The Class Struggle, founded by Ludwig Lore of the New Yorker Volkszeitung. Lore's magazine, which first saw print in May 1917, related current events in Europe and discussed matters of import written by various adherents of the Zimmerwald Left with an eager English-speaking audience. Co-editing the magazine with Lore were Louis C. Fraina, a former member of the Socialist Labor Party and voluminous writer on themes relating to the European revolutionary movement, and Louis Boudin, a well known Marxist theoretician.

Another regular publication loyal to the left-wing was International Socialist Review published by Charles H. Kerr.

A Socialist Propaganda League of America had been formed in Boston and by late 1918 had succeeded in taking over the Boston local. The Boston newspaper, The Revolutionary Age became the major voice of the Left wing in late 1918 and early 1919.

=== Formation of the Left Wing Section ===
In New York a specific Left wing group within the party had been formed in February 1919, and began publishing the New York Communist. After the National Executive Committee voided the election returns to a new National Executive Committee, which would have a left majority, and expelled several Left Wing locals and federations in May 1919, the Leftist groups decided to meet in a conference in late June.

At the conference however, there was still much dissension. The seven expelled federations and the Michigan party demanded that the Left wing go ahead and form a communist party, while the group around the Revolutionary Age still wanted to try to take over the Socialist party at its September convention. The Federations and the Michigan group walked out and formed a National Organization Committee, which was set on organizing a founding Communist convention to rival the socialist convention in September. They also began publishing their own newspaper, The Communist.

=== The Left Wing National Council ===
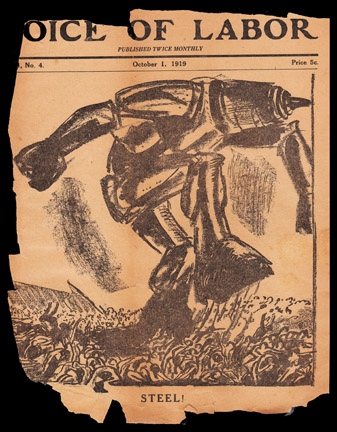
John Reed and Ben Gitlow's Left Wing magazine Voice of Labor was later made the labor paper of the Communist Labor Party.

The majority founded the National Council of the Left Wing and planned to take the socialist organization and convention. The council members included Louis Fraina, C. E. Ruthenberg, I. E. Ferguson, John Ballam, James Larkin, Eamon MacAlpine, Benjamin Gitlow, Maximilian Cohen, and Bertram Wolfe. Ferguson was named national secretary and the Revolutionary Age, with Fraina as editor, became the official organ.

The left wingers who had been elected to the new NEC but had been purged by the old NEC in May held a rump meeting in Chicago, on July 26–27, tabulating the votes for themselves and asking the national secretary, Adolph Germer, to hand over the keys to the party headquarters. They were rebuffed. On July 28, the National Council of the Left Wing gave in and voted to attend the Chicago convention organized by the National Organizing Committee to form the Communist Party of America.

Three members of the National Council, however, Gitlow, Larkin and MacAlpine, were adamantly opposed to this. They, together with John Reed and Alfred Wagenknecht, formed a new faction, the Labor Committee of the Left Wing with a new organ, the Voice of Labor.

=== The Emergency National Convention of 1919 ===
At the August 31 opening of the Socialist party convention the Reed-Gitlow group tried to enter and present their credentials, but were promptly thrown out of the hall with the help of the police. The Left Wingers, joined by other socialist delegates who walked out of the convention in protest over the incident or for other disagreements with the socialist party, including the entire Ohio delegation, then met in the billiards room on the first floor of the Machinists Hall in Chicago and formed the Communist Labor Party.

== Members ==
- Israel Amter
- John J. Ballam
- Dennis E. Batt
- Max Bedacht
- Alexander Bittelman
- Louis B. Boudin
- Vera Buch
- James P. Cannon
- Maximilian Cohen
- J. Louis Engdahl
- Isaac Edward Ferguson
- Louis C. Fraina
- Benjamin Gitlow
- Bolesław Gebert
- Mike Gold
- George Halonen
- Otto Huiswoud
- Fannie Jacobs
- Abram Jakira
- Oakley C. Johnson
- L. E. Katterfeld
- John Keracher
- Charles H. Kerr
- William F. Kruse
- James Larkin
- Ludwig Lore
- Jay Lovestone
- John Reed
- S. J. Rutgers
- C. E. Ruthenberg
- Jacob Benjamin Salutsky
- Louis Shapiro
- Rose Pastor Stokes
- Alfred Wagenknecht
- William Weinstone
- Harry Winitsky
- Bertram Wolfe
