= H. M. Wicks =

American journalist and politician (1889–1956)

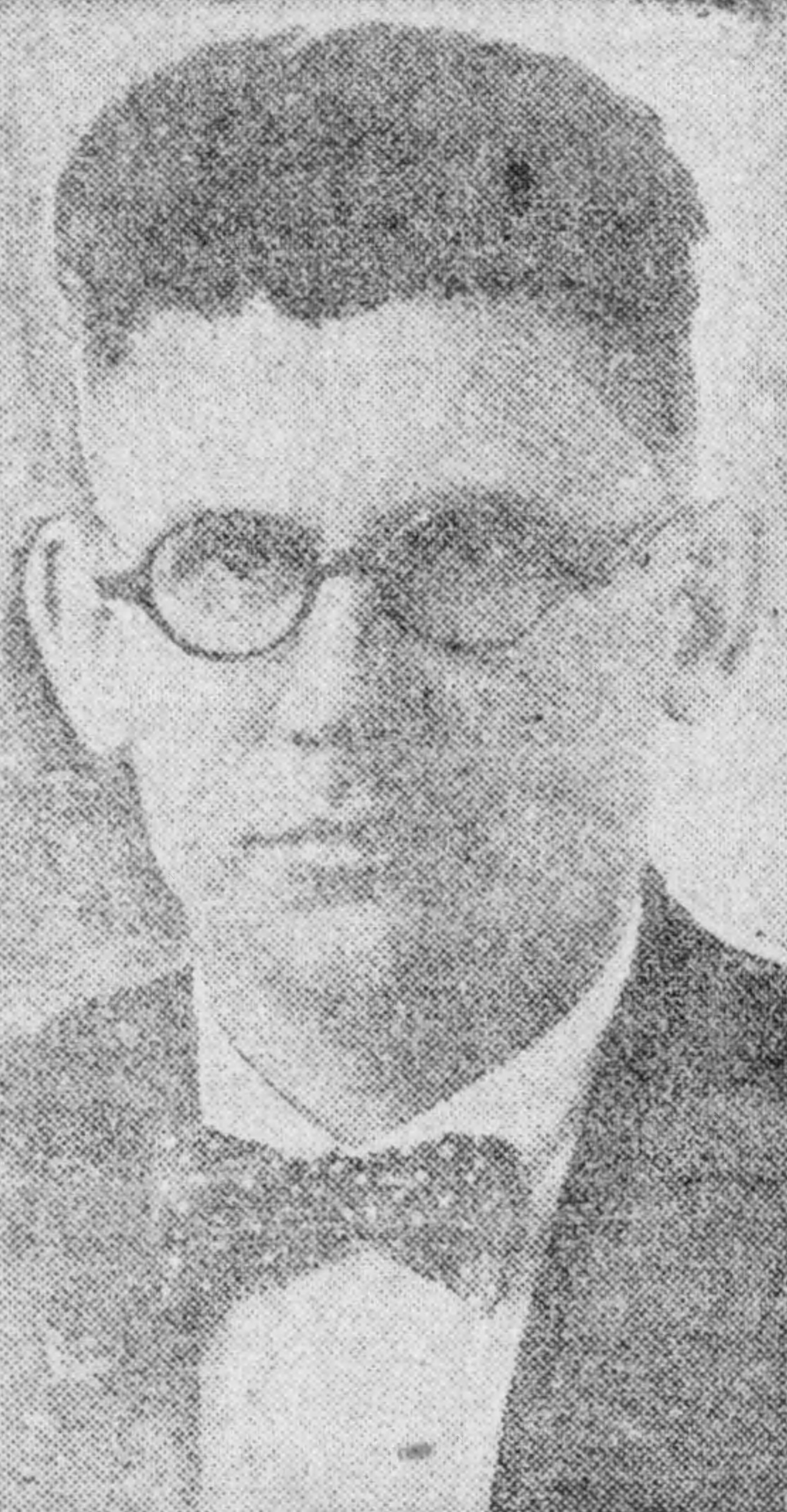
Wicks c. 1928

Herbert Moore "Harry" Wicks (1889–1956), best known as "Harry M. Wicks," was an American radical journalist and politician who was a founding member of the Communist Party of America. He was a plenipotentiary representative of the Communist International to Australia in 1930-31 and there directed the reorganization of the structure and leadership of the Communist Party of Australia.

== Biography ==
=== Early years ===
Harry M. Wicks is one of the most enigmatic leaders of the early American communist movement. Wicks was born in Arcola, Illinois on December 10, 1889, the son of an electrical engineer. He attended primary school in Arcola and grammar school in Algona and Des Moines, Iowa. He worked as a journeyman compositor in the printing industry.

=== Political activism ===
Harry Wicks was an adherent of the John Keracher's Proletarian University tendency in the Socialist Party of Michigan from 1916.

Wicks was the candidate of the Socialist Party of Oregon for the US House of Representatives in the state's 3rd District in November 1918. Early the next year he was one of 28 candidates who ran for the SPA's governing National Executive Committee, failing to win election.

Wicks was the organizer and served as the President of the short-lived Council of Workers, Soldiers, and Sailors in Portland, Oregon in 1919. Wicks was also the editor of The Western Socialist in this period. When Wicks was replaced by a member of the local Foundry Workers' Union as President of the Council, he left the group, which expired after approximately 6 months of existence.

Wicks was a delegate to Founding Convention of Communist Party of America and on the 9 member committee which wrote the CPA Program in 1919. The founding convention elected Wicks to the Central Executive Committee of the CPA, which in turn elected him to its governing inner circle, the Executive Council. Wicks was the only member of the Michigan tendency to accept office in the new CPA. He also served as associate editor of the party's official organ, The Communist. Wicks was jailed in Nov. 1919 in connection with these activities as part of the Justice Department's crackdown on members of the Communist Party.

In 1920, Wicks rejoined his Michigan comrades when he became a member of the Proletarian Party of America, serving on the governing National Executive Committee of that organization. Wicks was the fraternal delegate of the PPA to the founding convention of the Workers Party of America in Dec. 1921, but he came as a foe rather than a friend, engaging in a bitter criticism of that organization. After the Proletarian Party's decision to support the legal arm of the Central Caucus faction's "Communist Party of America" in 1922, Wicks was named as the editor of the organ of this "United Toilers of America," The Workers' Challenge. This publication was later recalled as home to "the most violent and vituperative polemics in America," provoking one Communist Party wag to refer to their rivals as the "United Toilets."

The bitterness between Wicks' organization and the Communist Party proved short-lived, however. Along with most of his United Toilers comrades, Harry Wicks joined the Workers Party of America following the liquidation of the Central Caucus split in the summer of 1922. The hatchet was quickly buried. Harry Wicks was named to the governing Central Executive Committee of the WPA by the party's December 1922 convention, as well as to the 11 man "Executive Council" which handled day-to-day operations of the party. He was also named to the editorial board of the party's weekly newspaper The Worker at that time. He also delivered the report on the printing trades to the first annual convention of William Z. Foster's Trade Union Educational League in August 1922.

The year 1923 also saw Harry Wicks named National Organizer for the WPA. In the fall of that year he conducted a 5-week East Coast speaking tour on behalf of the party. Wicks was a delegate to the 3rd Convention of the WPA in 1923 and was a consistent backer of the Pepper-Ruthenberg faction.

In the summer of 1923, Wicks was sent by the governing Central Executive Committee of the Workers Party to Minnesota to attempt to negotiate an alliance with William Mahoney, a newspaper editor and Farmer-Labor Party veteran and a number of his colleagues. However, Wicks clashed with local Communists in Minneapolis and it ultimately fell to machinist Clarence Hathaway to broker the deal.

In 1923 Wicks was accused of having acted as agent provocateur in 1919, charged with having denounced Communist Labor Party of America founding member Victor Saulit to immigration authorities while both were members of the Socialist Party of Oregon A WPA inquest commission cleared Wicks of this charge, however.

In the summer of 1924, Wicks was involved as a leader of the Paterson Broad Silk strike, which began on August 12.

In 1924, Wicks was the candidate of the Workers Party for U.S. Congress in the New York 23rd District. Two years later he was the party's nominee for Governor of Pennsylvania.

In 1928 Wicks was a delegate to the 6th World Congress of the Comintern.

Wicks returned to Moscow at the end of 1928 as the American Communist Party's representative to the Profintern. As a representative in Moscow, Wicks was expected to take the lead arguing the controversial positions of American party Executive Secretary Jay Lovestone, leader of the faction to which Wicks professed loyalty. However, given Wicks' uneven past in the factional wars, this was, as historian Theodore Draper has noted, "a strange choice in an emergency."

In 1929 the Executive Committee of the Communist International called the American party leadership onto the carpet over the claim of Lovestone and his top associates that the American party was entitled to follow their own particular path to revolution due to the national exceptionalism of the largest country in the capitalist world. A large delegation was dispatched to Moscow, a group which included the representative to the Profintern, Harry Wicks. Lovestone and his associate Benjamin Gitlow refused to accept the admonishment of the Comintern and were subsequently expelled. Wicks chose to accept the Comintern's position, however, and he remained in Moscow. He would subsequently be sent abroad to root out the similar political heresy in Australia.

In the fall of 1929 Wicks returned to the United States briefly, running as a Communist for president of the New York City board of aldermen.

=== Comintern representative ===
In April 1930, Harry M. Wicks, using the pseudonym "Herbert Moore," his given and middle names, arrived in Sydney, Australia as a plenipotentiary representative of the Comintern. Wicks made use of the mechanism of self-criticism — ritual public confession of failings by "errant" individuals — as a means of instilling ideological uniformity and party discipline. Australian party leaders Jack Ryan and Jack Kavanagh were two who ran afoul of Wicks during the reorganization.

In April 1931 the Australian Communist Party held its 10th Congress and completed the reorganization begun by Wicks in the previous year. Former state branches were reconstituted into 8 numbered districts, each of which was further divided into numbered sub-districts. At every level a committee supervised the work of the subordinate level and all communication was mandated to be made hierarchically, with sideways communication between units of a particular level prohibited. At the top of the new party hierarchy would sit a secretariat of just three members. Criticism of Wicks was publicly voiced at this Congress. Australian Communist Ted Tripp declared to the delegates that he had met American students at the Comintern's Lenin School who considered Wicks a "huge joke" and revealed that Wicks had asked him to feign friendship with Jack Kavanagh in order to root out his factional plans. Tripp was revolted by the suggestion.

Delegate Jack Loughran, one of the most outspoken dissidents in the Australian Communist Party, declared that "the Party is being reduced to a party of gramophones that will only play one record — it must be 'Moore's Melody."

For his part Harry Wicks, who opened the Congress with a keynote speech lasting four hours, congratulated the loyal majority for conducting a discussion which "annihilated" the arguments of the dissidents. "We are going to have one monolithic whole," Wicks confidently predicted.

His reorganizational task finished, Wicks left Australia in July 1931.

It bears mentioning that Harry Wicks' well documented Comintern mission in Australia may not have been his only task abroad for Moscow. In his 1940 memoir, former member of the Secretariat of the CPUSA Benjamin Gitlow asserted that "H.M. Wicks went on special missions to Germany and Central America." This assertion by Gitlow is unconfirmed.

=== Return to American politics ===
Historian Harvey Klehr asserts that Harry Wicks was the Communist Party's District Organizer for a district which included Chattanooga, Tennessee in the summer of 1931, using the pseudonym "Allen." This matter remains less than certain.

Harry Wicks reemerged in American politics during the middle 1930s. In 1934 Wicks was the CPUSA's candidate for US Senate from Pennsylvania.

In 1937, Harry Wicks was expelled from the Communist Party on the basis of charges made by the Chicago Federation of Labor that he was a spy. This time the charges stuck and Wicks was expelled. Adding insult to injury, the old accusation which he had dodged in 1923 was revisited and it was declared that Wicks had been a spy ever since joining the party in 1919. Historian Theodore Draper later claimed, on the basis of a review of Wicks' private papers, that there was actually no convincing evidence of the veracity of these charges — which may well have been influenced by the spy-mania of the Great Purges then sweeping the Soviet Union.

Following his expulsion, Harry Wicks moved to Chicago and worked there as a typesetter until his death in 1956. He spoke periodically under the auspices of the Independent Labor League of America, the final incarnation of the Communist oppositional movement headed by Jay Lovestone, teaching a fortnightly "study class" on the subject of "Present Day Capitalism" in early 1939.

Shortly after his death a book by Wicks was published on the history of the Russian Revolution and world communist movement, arguing it had been "completely negated into an instrument for the degradation and enslavement of those who toil."

== Views of Harry M. Wicks by his contemporaries ==
- Oakley C. Johnson, a member of the Socialist Party of Michigan and founding member of the Communist Party of America along with Harry Wicks was a bitter critic of his views and personality traits. In a 1966 memoir, Johnson recalled:

Another Keracher adherent, but a strange and undependable one, was Harry M. Wicks, for whom I bore a secret dislike. He was a master of profanity and invective, and his speeches and articles were full of both. He had extraordinary intellectual vanity (knew everything, was always right), and very little charm. He was a fattish man, with plump hips, eyes that were round and small, and a red face.

- Benjamin Gitlow, a former member of the Secretariat of the CPUSA who later turned to conservative anti-communism emphasized Wick's aggressiveness as a soapbox speaker at the Passaic Textile Strike of 1926:

The [Textile] Committee had sent Mary Heaton Vorse to Washington to line up Congressional support for a Congressional Investigation of Passaic... Mrs. Vorse also sharply attacked H.M. Wicks for the kind of a speech he made before the strikers, Wicks had the reputation of being the most vitriolic speaker in the party. In the speech she referred to he said: 'Let the American Legion come on... Bring with you your Red Cross ambulances and nurses.'

== Works ==
- "Emma Goldman," Workers' Challenge [New York], vol. 1, no. 2 (April 1, 1922), pg. 4.
- Eclipse of October: How a Revolution that Proclaimed the Emancipation of All Who Toil was Negated into an Instrument of Tyranny. Chicago: Challenge Publishers, 1957.
