= Nat Ganley =

American labor activist & journalist (1903–1969)

- Born: Nathan Kaplan, Nick Ganley; November 26, 1903; New York City
- Died: October 12, 1969 (aged 65)
- Other name: Nat Kaplan
- Occupation: union activist
- Years active: 1919-1950s
- Employer(s): CPUSA, UAW
- Known for: helping unionize in Michigan
- Movement: Communism
- Criminal charges: Smith Act violation (convicted, overturned)
- Spouse: Ann Ganley

Nat Ganley, or Nat Kaplan (born Nathan Kaplan; 1903–1969), was a socialist and later communist journalist who became a union organizer in the 1930s, particularly for the United Auto Workers of America. He was tried and convicted in 1954 for violating the Smith Act, but his conviction was later overturned.

== Background ==
Nat Ganley was born Nathan Kaplan on November 26, 1903, in New York City. He finished eighth grade in public school. Around 1917, he joined the Socialist Party of America and then the Young Peoples Socialist League (YPSL).

== Career ==
In 1919, Ganley became a communist and became national secretary for the Young Workers' League of America (YWL) (which became the Young Communist League USA). As national junior director of the YWL, Kaplan summarized the difference between his communist group and others by stating: "Let us remember that is it mainly on this point that we differ from the old form of child organization – the worker's Sunday schools. We are not only preparing the child for future participation in class struggle–we are leading the child in the class struggle now!"

In the early 1930s (or late 1920s), Kaplan joined the staff of the CPUSA's Daily Worker newspaper and also became a union organizer (particularly for the National Textile Workers Union (NTWU) for the CPUSA's New England district). On February 3, 1930, Kaplan spoke for the Daily Worker at a rally in New York City to protest war preparations by the government of Mexico against the USSR. On October 22, 1932, Kaplan was the main speaker at a torch parade for the Italian branch of the International Workers Order.

By June 1934, Nat Kaplan moved to Detroit, where he published articles in the Daily Worker. He organized for the Trade Union Unity League (TUUL) and American Federation of Labor (AFL) locals including the Poultry Workers Union, Packing House Workers, and Riggers Union. In Detroit, "Ganley helped organize one of the first UAW locals: the East Side Tool and Die Local 155 in Detroit in 1936." The United Auto Workers of America (UAW) was a member union of the Congress of Industrial Organizations (CIO) union federation. On February 6, 1935, he spoke at a rally to back Maurice Sugar, then a noted labor attorney, for the position of judge of the Recorder's Court. With Stanley Nowak and John Anderson, he helped organize Detroit's first sit-down strikes at Alcoa and Midland Steel Products.

From 1937 to 1947, he served as business agent for UAW Local 155 and edited its publication Common Sense. In April 1938, during a CIO convention in Michigan, where CPUSA-supported UAW president Homer Martin was facing opposition, Ganley met with William Weinstone (head of the Michigan CPUSA), Boleslaw Gebert, and Richard Frankensteen, who together decided to break with a "Unity Caucus" between the CPUSA and Socialists led by Walter Reuther and later contributed to Martin's ouster. In March 1939, Ganley negotiated a 7-cent raise (to $1.03 an hour) for the UAW-CIO's Saginaw Local 537 with US Graphite Co. In mid-March 1939, Ganley was elected to the Resolutions Committee of the national UAW-CIO. By May 1939, Ganley was signing labor contracts no longer for UAW Local 155 but for the UAW-CIO. By August 1, 1940, political differences with the Reuther brothers received notice in the United Automobile Worker newspaper, with Victor Reuther asserting that the USSR had linked itself to Nazi Germany through the 1939 Hitler-Stalin Pact, while Ganley asserted that he had "first-hand" knowledge that the USSR was "not a totalitarian nation." On August 15, 1940, during the national UAW-CIO convention, Walter Reuther attacked "Brother Ganley" for reversing his "beautiful resolution" the year before that praised President Franklin Delano Roosevelt." In March 1941, Ganley found himself among a dozen UAW-CIO officials subpoenaed by I.A. Capizzi, attorney for the Ford Motor Co., to prove his allegation that the UAW-CIO and the local office of the National Labor Relations Board (NLRB) had fallen under Communist control. Among the others were CPUSA executives Earl Browder, Robert Minor, and William Z. Foster, Michigan Communist Party chief William Weinstone, and Boleslaw Gebert as well as CIO leaders Philip Murray, John Brophy, Len De Caux, Lee Pressman, and the NLRB's Nathan Witt. (In 1948, Whittaker Chambers named Pressman and Witt as member of the Ware Group he ran in Washington; in 1950, Pressman confirmed Witt and himself as members.) In June 1944, as both UAW-CIO and Communist figure, Ganley endorsed incumbent Polish-American US Representative John Lesinski Sr. for Congress. In December 1944, the Clayton & Lambert Co. fired 183 Afro-American employees for staging a one-night strike. Ganley announced that the CIO would not contest the firings because the United States was at war. In August 1945, a Washington Evening Star editorial cited Ganley as one of several powerful Communist leaders who also remained in control of local, powerful unions (along with Frederick Myers of the National Maritime Union and David Davis of the United Electrical Workers). In March 1948, "Stalinist" Ganley found himself voted out of his role as business agent after the Local 155 election, when Walter Reuther won over John Anderson as president, as reported by the Third-Camp Trotskyist publication Labor Action.

In addition to union work in Michigan, Ganley remained active in the national CPUSA. In the 1940s, he helped form and served on the national committee of the (then) Communist Political Association (CPA) and in the 1930s and 1940s on the Michigan state committee. From 1947 to 1950, he published the Michigan Herald and state edition of the Daily Worker.

== Anti-communist attacks ==
As early as 1936, Ganley under both names (Nat Ganley, Nat Kaplan) had become a target of anti-communist propaganda by the Constitutional Educational League. In 1936, their pamphlet Butter, Shoes, a Radio, and a Car! named him as a national communist figure "for years." In 1937, anti-communist crusader Joseph P. Kamp of the Constitutional Educational League gave him a separate biographical entry in another anti-CIO pamphlet. On August 6, 1937, the anti-communist group "Real Friends of the Worker" published a third-page ad whose contents included the question "Why are Nat Ganley, Walter and Vic Reuther and Israel Berestein, all known to be leading Communists, officially connected with the C.I.O.?"

On October 13, 1938, Kaplan's name appeared in the Dies Committee testimony of Detroit resident Walter S. Reynolds of the American Legion. A few days later, on October 19, 1938, Ford Motor Company employee Clyde Morrow described Nat Ganley as "a Communist and member several unions at one time under different names" during the 1936 sit-down at Midland Steel.

In 1947, Kamp called him "one of Reuther's top leaders in the UAW-CIO in Detroit." In 1947–8, Plain Talk anti-communist magazine noted Ganley as a casualty in the war internal to the UAW between communists like Ganley and the Reuther brothers.

== Smith Act trial ==
In September 1952, the FBI arrested Ganley among 18 (15 men, 3 women) long-time CPUSA leaders. In 1953, African-American former communist William O'Dell Nowell testified that Ganley had been one of his trainers at the International Lenin School in Moscow.

By 1954, Ganley and five others had been tried and convicted under the Smith Act, later ordered for rehearing by the United States Supreme Court and overturned at the United States Court of Appeals. (This trial was one of many Smith Act trials of Communist Party leaders from 1949 to 1958.)

== Personal life and death ==
Ganley was married to Ann Ganley.

Ganley supported civil rights for African-Americans and foreign-born Americans.

Ganley helped organize first United CIO and AFL Labor Day parade in Detroit.

Nat Ganley died age 65 on October 12, 1969.

== Legacy ==
In his 1952 memoir Witness, Whittaker Chambers wrote that Robert Minor replaced him with "Nat Kaplan" during his ouster from the Daily Worker:

Nevertheless, I was not quite prepared, when I walked into the Daily Worker office early the next afternoon, to find a stranger sitting at my place in the slot. But I knew at a glance what had happened.
I had become "a politically unreliable element ." Grateful Bob Minor, to demonstrate his new-found loyalty to the new overlords, had decided to make a political offering of me. He had warned them that I had doubts, that I had said that I was no longer able to edit the Daily Worker. I was not angry with him. But I was sorry that he should have let himself be less than he was, especially in truckling to men who were so much less than he.
The stranger at the copy desk turned out to be Nat Kaplan, a young Communist, who, if I remember rightly, had just returned from the Soviet Union. (Under another name, he was later to be employed by the C.I.O. Auto Workers Union.) Minor instructed me coldly to teach Kaplan my job. "Because you are overworked and need assistance," said that childish hypocrite. Kaplan was restrained, self-consciously pleasant and very alert, exactly in the manner of any detective who hopes to elicit all possible information from a man before he arrests him. We worked together quietly through the afternoon. I showed him just what to do. He was quick and bright.

When he died, the Detroit Jewish News remember him as both an important, early UAW organizer and an "important member of the Michigan Communist Party."

In 1970, wife Ann Ganley gave the Walter Reuther Library at Wayne State University an archive of Nat Ganley. Subjects include: 1955 Auto Contracts, Convention Notes (1936–37, 1939–42, 1951, 1955), the WWII No Strike Pledge 1941–1945, Post War Reconversion 1945–1946, Homer Martin Struggle 1938–1939, Communist Party, Chrysler Strike 1950, Ford Strike 1949, Sitdown Strike 1937, Foley Square trial, Michigan Smith Trial, Gerald L.K. Smith, CIO Political Action Committee 1952–1956, Communist Party National Programs (1954, 1959, 1966, 1969), Civil Rights, Automation, and Guaranteed Annual Wage.

Ganley's papers became embroiled in controversy in 1996, when his name resurfaced in an article by Martin Glaberman the independent socialist journal Monthly Review over the issue of whether Walter Reuther was ever a CPUSA member:

In fact Reuther was a member of the CP (for less than a year). Nat Ganley, a leading CP militant in the UAW—commenting on a book manuscript to his comrades at International Publishers—said he was a member. "I collected his dues." But he recommends that that fact be deleted from the book—which it was. The book was Brother Bill McKie, the biography of an important CP organizer at the Rouge plant. When I discovered this in Ganley's papers in the Wayne State University Labor Archives, I reported it in a small article. At the time, I didn't think it was all that significant, but I have since modified that view. My experience in getting it published was at least as interesting as the facts themselves. Labor History, the liberal, pro-labor academic journal, refused to publish it on the grounds that it was terrible news, "if true," and they could get sued! This was in the 1970s about something Ganley had written in the 1950s about a relatively brief event in the 1930s. Who in the world was going to sue? Ultimately the piece was published in Radical America.1 After its publication I learned that Ganley's widow, Ann Ganley, had tried to steal the documentary evidence from the Archives. In fact, she did steal it—but I had made photocopies of the material and was able to restore it to the Archives at their request.

== Works ==
Articles for the Daily Worker

- "The Daily Worker, Always the Champion of Working Youth" (1929)
- "Rank and File Auto Workers Battle A.F.L. Leaders" (1934)

Articles for the United Automobile Worker

- "Local 155 Views with Pride its Achievements of the Past Year" (1937)

== See also ==
- Walter Reuther
- United Auto Workers of America
- Smith Act trials of Communist Party leaders

== Sources ==
- Draper, Thedore (1960). American Communism and Soviet Russia: The Formative Period. Viking Press. p. 491. ISBN 9780374923341.
- Epstein, Melech (194). The Jew and Communism: The Story of Early Communist Victories and Ultimate Defeats in the Jewish Community, U. S. A., 1919-1941. Trade Union Sponsoring Committee. p. 414 (fn 459).
- Williams, Charles (22 November 2012). "Americanism and anti-communism: the UAW and repressive liberalism before the red scare". Labor History. 53 (4): 495–515. doi:10.1080/0023656X.2012.731771. S2CID 144188227.
