= Proletarian University =

Organisations which have adopted the name 'Proletarian University include:

- Vpered, a grouping within the Bolshevik Party set up a prototype Proletarian University on the Isle of Capri in 1908.
- Proletkult was involved in setting up the Proletarian University in Russia in 1918.
- Proletarian Party of America was involved in the Proletarian University set up in Detroit.
