= United Toilers of America =

1920s Marxist legal group

The United Toilers of America, established in 1922, was the legal wing of an underground Marxist group which split off from the Communist Party of America in the fall of 1921. The organization published a weekly newspaper called Workers' Challenge and was effectively dissolved at the insistence of the Communist International by the time of the Bridgman Convention of August 1922 with its members rejoining the mainline Workers Party of America. A tiny underground rump organization resisted merger and continued an independent existence throughout the decade of the 1920s.

== History ==
In late 1921 and early 1922 a faction began to develop within the Communist Party of America which was upset with the direction the party was taking regarding legality and the creation of the "above ground" Workers Party of America. The dissident elements met at an emergency convention on January 7, 1922 and seceded from the party, declaring themselves the "real" CPA. In the historical literature this group is identified either as the CPA (central caucus), CPA (Left Opposition) or CPA (Uniter Toilers) after their legal front.

Despite being opposed to the timing and method of the creation of the Workers Party of America, they were not opposed in principle to the creation of an above ground organization. In fact, at the January convention, representatives of the small Proletarian Party had been present to persuade the delegates to choose that group as their legal arm. However the PPs overtures were rejected and the constituency groups in the Central Caucus met in conference in New York on February 18 to form the United Toilers of America as the groups "legal" organization. The groups which were represented at this conference reflect the largely immigrant and foreign-speaking character of this faction: Workers' Defense Conference of New England, the Alliance of Polish Workers of America, the Ukrainian Association, the Lettish Publishing Association, the Polish Publishing Association, the Lithuanian Workers' Association, the Woman's Progressive alliance.

The UTA faction was hampered from the beginning because the Comintern itself had ordered the creation of the legal party, in keeping with in the international turn of "line" toward legality and the united front. In March, the Comintern held a hearing on the issue in Moscow, with Heinrich Brandler, Mátyás Rákosi, Ottomar Kuusinen, Boris Souvarine and Boris Reinstein presiding. The official CPA was represented by Max Bedacht and L. E. Katterfeld, and the UTA group by John Ballam. The Cominterns decision came down in no uncertain terms in favor of the official party, declaring that the group that held the Comintern line was the rightful Communist Party even if it represented a minority of the membership. John Ballam returned to the US on May 7 and a conference of the Central Caucus was held the next day at which Ballam reported his capitulation to the Comintern and urged the group to go back into the official CPA-Workers Party fold. The conference however "repudiated" his report and declared it would go on until they could present their case before the next Comintern Congress. They reasoned that Moscow had been "misinformed" about the real situation in America, and if only the Comintern leaders could be made aware of it, they would decide in their favor.

Before that congress could meet, however, the Comintern sent a special representative to the US with the mission to, among other things, reunite the party. At a convention of the UTA group in late September he negotiated the return of most of the faction to the official fold.

A small minority however would not rejoin the party and remained underground. It sent "Sullivan", Alfred S. Edwards, to the 4th Comintern congress that December to harangue the delegates about the "Menshevik" leadership of the American party and even the right-wing tendencies in the Comintern itself. In James P. Cannons memoir, The History of America Trotskyism, he mentions finding the group still active in 1929. They still used the old conspiratorial methods such as secret meetings and pseudonyms; one member even recognized Cannon, and started to address him as "Comrade Cook", his party name from years earlier. He in turn recognized their leader as "Sullivan" from the old days. By this time the group was headquartered in Boston and had a branch in Cleveland. They were willing to join the Trotskyists if they were going to be an underground organization. Writing in his memoir in 1944, Cannon guessed "I suppose they are still underground."

== Publications ==
The faction published two English language publications, The Communist for the under ground party and Workers Challenge for the UTA proper. The exact number of issues and their dates are difficult to ascertain. The Communist had at least six issues, with the first dated February 1922 and the sixth dated July 1922. Workers Challenge, edited by Harry Wicks, ran from Vol I #1 March 25, 1922 to Vol. 1 #27 September 23, 1922.

- (in Russian) Russkii anarkhizm v velikoi russkoi revoliutsii by IA. A. IAkovlev. Pamphlet published by the UTA.
- Manifesto on the Workers Party of America
- The Communist Vol. 1, No. 7 First issue of their incarnation of The Communist, continuing the numbering of main CPAs periodical of the same name.
