= Stanley Nowak =

Polish-American activist and politician

Stanley Nowak (March 14, 1903–April 26, 1994) was a Polish-American politician, trade unionist, and social activist. A strike organizer and civil rights activist, he was a member of the communist Proletarian Party of America, founder of the Polish Trade Union Committee at the UAW, and a two-time Democratic senator of Michigan.

== Early years ==
His family came from the lands of Austrian partition. His father, Jan Nowak, the son of a former peasant on Count Potocki's estate in Łańcut, near Przemyśl, decided to emigrate due to the constant threat of war and lack of economic prospects. In 1913, the family emigrated to the United States. They settled in Chicago.

Ten-year-old Stanley was enrolled in the nearby Sacred Heart parish school, where he began learning English. According to a biography written by his wife, as an eleven-year-old, for a small fee, he delivered Polish-language newspapers to neighbors, which he read himself. Sometimes he read the news to older workers who had never had the opportunity to learn to read and write. At home, his family spoke Polish, and he learned his first English words and phrases during the neighborhood children's street games. He left school in 1917, at the age of 14, and began working.

From 1921 to 1924, Nowak attended meetings and lectures of organizations such as the Polish People's University (PUL) at Schoenhoffen Hall on Ashland Avenue near Milwaukee and the Pilsudski Circle, also operating at Schoenhoffen Hall. He also attended weekly lectures by Socialist Party educator Arthur Morrow Lewis at the Garrick Theatre, which had a profound impact on shaping his worldview. Other significant influences during this time included socialist activist Clarence Darrow and Sarraine Loewe, wife of Carl Bareiter and a Proletarian Party activist. He read extensively in The Proletarian (later known as The Proletarian News), edited by John Keracher.

== Work and trade union activities ==
He finished his education in 1917 and took up full-time work as a frontman for the Polish newspaper Dziennik Związkowy, where he spent three years initially distributing news and doing odd jobs. He began writing his first articles. One of them was highly critical of meatpacking plants, which cost Nowak his job. He wrote about the injustice and employee dissatisfaction that was growing within the working-class community. The postwar era brought deepening financial problems for workers and strikes, particularly among immigrants. Raids were organized on meeting places and unions, later known as the Palmer Raids. Nowak, fluent in two languages, acted as a translator for arrested workers several times. After being fired from the editorial office, he took a job in a clothing store. In 1922, at the age of nineteen, he became the youngest chairman of a factory in the history of the local union, and a year later, he was unanimously re-elected. At work he met important union figures such as Leo Krzycki (vice president of the Amalgamated Clothing Workers) and Sidney Hillman (international president of the Amalgamated Clothing Workers).

Nowak quickly gained a reputation as a speaker in Polish and English, which led to him being invited to speak in Detroit during the celebrations of May 1, 1924, by the International Educational Association, publisher of the magazine Głos Robotniczy (Voice of the Workers).

Soon after, he was asked to become editor of the weekly magazine, which was struggling with debt and declining popularity. Circulation soon increased, but a lack of stable funding led to its bankruptcy in 1926. After the closure of the newspaper, Nowak returned to Chicago, where he resumed work at a clothing factory and continued his union activities.

In 1929, during a sharp decline in production at a clothing factory, Nowak, searching for the causes of the crisis, began intensive economic studies at the Crerar Library, where he discovered Karl Marx's Das Kapital, which significantly influenced the further direction of his life.

The stock market crash of October 1929 brought a wave of layoffs and reduced working hours for remaining workers. Commissioned by the Proletarian Party, Stanley Nowak prepared a report on homeless, unemployed workers, which appeared in The Proletarian.

From 1934, he worked at a small auto parts factory, continuing his social and political activities. He helped found a small branch of the UAW (United Auto Workers) there, but when the company learned of its existence, it fired all its members. He managed to find employment as a salesman in a paint store, where his knowledge of Polish came in handy. He worked Monday through Saturday, spending Sundays attending union or political meetings.

In June 1936, Stanley Nowak joined the international UAW team. His responsibilities included organizing workers from Central and Eastern Europe, including Poles, in Detroit. He founded the UAW Polish Trade Union Committee (UAW Polish Trade Union Committee). He produced Polish-language radio programs dedicated to workers, encouraging them to join the organization. The UAW Polish Trade Union Committee organized meetings in clubs and halls in Polish and Eastern European communities and distributed leaflets in Polish and English at factories, churches, and housing estates. Initially, meetings were small, but Stanley soon spoke before benefit organizations such as the Polish National Alliance, the Polish Roman Catholic Union, and the Polonia Society, as well as at social events, picnics, banquets, and political meetings. As part of a long-term commitment, Stanley began meeting at least once a week in Flint with small groups of Poles working at General Motors.

== Strikes ==
The first strike, led by Nowak on behalf of JAW, took place at American Aluminum (ALCOA) in Hamtramck in December 1936. Before the strike ended, Nowak was already involved in preparing another one at Automotive Fibers. Negotiations were successfully concluded after just three days. Negotiators Stanley Nowak, Allan Haywood, and William Carney reached an agreement with the company to recognize the union, grant a temporary five-cent-an-hour raise for all workers earning up to and including seventy cents an hour, reinstate all laid-off workers, and negotiate all remaining demands, including higher wages. At ALCOA, the strike continued. Negotiations were not reached until the end of the month. Agreement was reached on most demands, with the remaining demands to be resolved by a negotiating committee.

In January 1937, Nowak supported the strike at the General Motors plant in Detroit. During the strike in Flint, there were even fights with the police, later called the Battle of Bulls' Run. In February, an agreement was signed between the plant and the striking workers. Following the success of Flint, a decision was made to organize a strike at the Ternstedt plant, where a large number of employees were women, working in even worse conditions and for worse pay than men. Current contracts prohibited strikes, so Nowak encouraged slow work and low production output. According to Margaret Nowak, this was the first "slowdown" protest in the history of the UAW. It led to an agreement. The union announced the end of the strike on April 13.

In early 1938, the JAW assigned Nowak organizing duties at a small plant on Detroit's west side, the Federal Screw Works. They used strikebreakers or hired provocateurs (strikebreakers) who, escorted by police into the plant, were meant to oppose the protesting workers. Fights broke out, with 24 injured workers on the protesters' side. Nowak led the negotiations, supported by Walter Reuther and Adolph Germer. An agreement was reached on April 7 and adopted on April 9. It eliminated wage cuts, provided union recognition, and paid overtime at time and a half.

To standardize wages and working conditions in the nut and bolt industry, the Detroit Screw Council was formed on April 22 at UAW West Side Local 174, with twenty-five delegates from seven plants representing approximately 2,500 workers. Nowak served as chairman and James Staubaum as secretary.

== Political career ==
In 1938, supported by the Labor's Non-Partisan League and numerous immigrant groups, he became a candidate in the Democratic Party primary for the Michigan Senate. His campaign was based on mobilizing workers of various ethnicities and promoting workers' interests. The Polish-American Ladies New Deal Democratic Club provided crucial support in the campaign, not only providing official support but also financing the registration fee. Club members played a central role in the campaign, coordinating volunteers, organizing fundraisers, preparing logistics and food supplies, and their involvement attracted other ethnic groups to the campaign in the district. Nowak won the Democratic nomination. He also won the general election defeating Orville L. Hubbard, the future mayor of Dearborn, although the Democratic Party lost the statewide election. Stanley entered the Michigan Senate, which had 23 Republicans and only nine Democrats.

Nowak was re-elected and served as senator for a total of ten years. He was elected in November 1940 (75,255 votes) and in November 1942 (42,097 votes). In 1944, he won 95,944 votes.

In 1939, he delivered his first public address, addressing the issue of disproportionate social welfare. That same year, he passed an emergency resolution requesting $2 million for welfare in Detroit.

On March 19, 1947, Nowak attended a conference in Lansing on fair employment legislation. He and a group of eight other senators won the Fair Employment Practices bill.

Stanley's acquaintance with Senator Charles C. Diggs Sr. was crucial both in his personal life and his political career. He was the only African-American senator elected from Michigan. Together, they undertook an investigation into the misuse of funds on Detroit's social welfare and the housing conditions of aid recipients. They claimed that hundreds of people were housed in "rat-infested and fire-prone shacks." In 1941, they led a joint campaign for a Detroit Common Council. This was an unprecedented effort to unite black and white residents.

Stanley Nowak did not limit himself to politics and aid in the United States. He actively worked for Slavic unity (American Senate Congress), where he supported the American war effort and aid to Slavic countries, especially Poland. In 1941, he pushed through a resolution (Senate Concurrent Resolution No. 66) that called for full aid to countries fighting Hitler. He also condemned anti-Semitic propaganda.

== Views ==
According to a newspaper article by James C. Haswell, Stanley Nowak, as a senator, advocated for more liberal compensation for injured workers, greater unemployment benefits, more adequate pensions, and the establishment of specific minimum wages and working hours. He also called for the regulation of working conditions for women and children. He opposed the use of social assistance to lower wages.

Stanley Nowak repeatedly spoke up for the rights of racial minorities throughout his career, which distinguished him from the political strategy of other immigrant activists. As a senator from Michigan, he demanded that the city of Detroit provide black citizens with public housing in white housing estates.

He treated racism and anti-worker movements as two aspects of the same phenomenon:

We have a movement in America today that wants to divide Americans along racial and religious lines; a movement that denies equal rights to freeborn, Black, and Jewish people; a movement that wants to suppress unionized labor, to deny the democratic rights of people and labor. Are we now supposed to be loyal to such Americanism? My answer is: NO.

He opposed any colonial dependence. In 1941, he declared:

We must work to defeat the Nazis and to establish the right of all nations to their independence, including even those nations that are now dependent on Great Britain, such as India. The defeat of Nazi Germany cannot mean replacing the German empire with any other. All empires and imperialism, whether German, British, or any other, must be abolished.

== Later career ==
His union activities and accusations of communist sympathies brought him considerable criticism. Twice, attempts were made to strip him of his U.S. citizenship and deport him. The first accusation was made in 1942, alleging he had acquired citizenship illegally and was arrested. Attorney General Francis Biddle blocked the attempt. A second attempt followed in 1952, which resulted in a trial in 1954 and a verdict revoking Nowak's citizenship. However, he was acquitted by the Supreme Court in 1958.

In 1948, Stanley Nowak lost the congressional primary. In 1949, he and Charles A. Hill ran for Detroit City Council. He did not win, but Hill received about 60% of the vote, primarily in areas with a Polish population.

After ending his career as a senator, he started selling printing services on commission for Chene Printing Co. They printed, among others, "The People's Voice". He was also invited to many lectures, for which he was paid a fee.

After 1955, he became editor of Głos Ludowy, a magazine that had problems with financing and maintaining interest. He remained in this position until 1980.

He was also actively involved in Polish affairs and maintained contacts with the Polish diaspora. He visited Poland in 1958, 1960, 1964, and 1981. In 1960, he co-created a documentary film that tracked the rebuilding of Polish industry and the country's progress. During the founding congress of Solidarność in Gdańsk in 1981, he acted as a press observer.

== Private life ==
In 1932, at a social gathering at the Proletarian Party headquarters, Stanley Nowak, then 29, met 24-year-old Margaret Collingwood. She had participated in the unemployment movement and in some demonstrations, such as those for the release of Tom Mooney, a West Coast labor leader. After their marriage, Stanley Nowak moved into Margaret's family home in Detroit.

== Bibliography ==
- Don Binkowski, Nowak Stanley, Pula J. (ed.), The Polish American Encyclopedia, Jefferson, North Carolina, London 2011.
- Margaret Nowak, Two who Were There: A Biography of Stanley Nowak, Detroit 1989.
- Charles Williams, The Racial Politics of Progressive Americanism: New Deal Liberalism and the Subordination of Black Workers in the UAW, "Studies in American Political Development", 19, 2005.
- Robert M. Zecker, "Suppressed by swords and lead": Radical Slovak and Polish Newspapers Combat Colonialism, "Journal of Transnational American Studies", 15 (1), 2024.
- Robert M. Zecker, "We Dare Entertain Thoughts not to the Liking of Present-Day Bigots": Radical Slavs, Race, Civil Rights, and Anti-Communism in Red-Scare America, "Journal of the Canadian Historical Association" 25 (2), 2014.
