= Socialist Party of Michigan =

Political party

- Chairperson: Andy Argo
- Senate leader: None
- House leader: None
- Founded: 1973
- Headquarters: Detroit, MI
- Ideology: Democratic socialism Revolutionary socialism Socialist feminism
- National affiliation: Socialist Party USA
- Colors: Red

Website
- SPMI

The Socialist Party of Michigan (SPMI) is the state chapter of the Socialist Party USA in the U.S. state of Michigan. A party by the same name was the affiliate of the Socialist Party of America from 1901 until the national party renamed itself in a 1973 split.

== Organizational history ==
=== Formation ===
The Socialist Party of Michigan was the state affiliate of the Socialist Party of America (SPA), established in the summer of 1901. During the late 1910s the organization came under the influence of a radical faction based in Detroit headed by John Keracher, which banned the advocacy of ameliorative reforms by party members, under penalty of expulsion. This brought the organization into conflict with the National Office of the SPA, which expelled the state organization in May 1919, "reorganizing" the state organization under more moderate leadership that same year.

=== Development ===
Michigan went "dry" early in 1918, which had the effect of putting a number of bars and beer gardens out of business. Meeting halls became comparatively cheap to rent and purchase. Late in April 1918, Socialist Party regular Maurice Sugar and his friends helped to raise $10,000 through entertainments and raffles to pay for the down payment on a large building in Detroit which was later christened "The House of the Masses." A corporation consisting of members of Local Detroit Socialist Party was put in trust of the facility, which had a restaurant, game rooms, meeting rooms, and a large hall. With the establishment of a proper headquarters facility, membership in the Detroit Socialist organization increased dramatically, although fundraising to continue payments on the $70,000 facility also proved to be a burden for the local organization.

=== Conventions ===
The 1916 convention was held in Muskegon on Sunday, September 17, and Monday, September 18, and was attended by some 60 delegates. The gathering was called to order by State Secretary John Keracher of Detroit. The report of the State Executive Committee showed an increase of membership in the party to about 4,000, although the organization remained on unsure financial grounds, showing a deficit of over $500.

The gathering readopted the organization's 1914 platform, with the elimination of a section voicing the organization's favor for industrial organization. This appears to have been a victory of the Keracher faction, drawing the ire of a group of 8 delegates, who submitted and official written criticism charging that the convention "clearly manifested" the "conspicuous act" of "failure... to pledge allegiance to the national and international organizations" and to lend support to the trade union movement.

The gathering also approved the publication of the official state bulletin as a section within The Michigan Socialist, up to that time the organ of Local Detroit, as a cost-saving measure and nominated a full slate of candidates for the fall 1916 elections. This was regarded as a defeat by Keracher and his associates, of opposed the "party regular" tenor of the publication, with Keracher declaring the decision "a ruse to circulate the paper throughout the state."

The 1918 convention was held September 7 and 8 in the "House of the Masses" in Detroit and was attended by 56 delegates. The gathering named party regular Maurice Sugar chairman of the convention by a narrow margin. Chief on the agenda was the question of the level of support to be given by the state organization to the European revolutionary movement in general and the Russian revolution in particular, with radical resolutions by John Keracher and Alexander Rovin "to support the Soviet Government in every possible way and to the last dollar and man" defeated by the convention's moderate majority, on the grounds that such declarations might be illegal under the Espionage Act.

In its final session, the gathering had a heated battle over the financing and terms of support for The Proletarian, the new publication of the Keracher-Proletarian University faction. Keracher lieutenant Al Renner introduced a motion calling for state financing and official support of the publication, which prompted the vigorous opposition by the moderate wing, led by Sugar, on the grounds that the publication "did not follow the policy of the National Office." Defeated on the floor of the convention, a group of radical delegates got together downtown at the offices of The Proletarian afterwards and established a new organization which was to operate as an organized faction within the SPA — the "Proletarian University of America."

The regular 1919 convention of the Socialist Party of Michigan was held February 24 in Grand Rapids. Some 51 delegates were in attendance, characterized in an article in the Left Wing press as a "harmonious gathering of boosters." The convention acted upon the resignation of State Secretary Bloomenberg by electing John Keracher to fill the balance of his unexpired term, passed a program calling for the establishment of socialism while presenting no ameliorative demands, passed a resolution on religion calling for all party agitators to speak against it from the basis of historical materialism, and unanimously endorsed the expansion of Marxist study groups in the state.

=== 1973 re-organization ===
The SPMI is also the successor to Michigan's former Human Rights Party, which elected multiple candidates to the City Councils of Ann Arbor and Ypsilanti before merging into SPMI in 1977.

The SPMI engages in electoral politics and non-electoral activism. Non-electoral activism includes explicitly socialist support for labor and unionization, anti-war and anti-imperialist agitation, support for feminist and anti-racist campaigns, and regular political forums, literature distributions, and demonstrations. The Socialist Party of Michigan also intermittently publishes a political magazine, The Michigan Socialist.

Although Michigan's restrictive ballot access laws have thus far prevented the SPMI from obtaining a state ballot line, it has nevertheless run candidates in each of the past seven (2004, 2006, 2008, 2010, 2012, & 2016) state general elections, who have qualified for the ballot by means of either obtaining the subsequent dual nomination of the ballot qualified Green Party of Michigan or by petition as independents. In each such instance, the Party's candidates have consistently run under the banner of the Socialist Party in all campaign materials and activities, in spite of their inability to have the Party's label listed with their names on the election ballot. Since 2004, the SPMI has run candidates on the ballot in two campaigns for U.S. Congress, four campaigns for the State House of Representatives, two campaigns for the State Board of Education, one campaign for the University of Michigan Board of Regents, one campaign for Michigan State University Board of Trustees, one campaign for Wayne State University Board of Governors, and one campaign for Oakland Community College Board of Trustees.

In 2004, the SPMI also qualified the Socialist Party ticket of Walt Brown for President and Mary Alice Herbert for Vice President for the Michigan ballot under the state qualified label of the nationally defunct Natural Law Party, combined with a slate of SPMI presidential electors. In 2016, it did the same for the Socialist Party presidential ticket of Mimi Soltysik and Angela Nicole Walker. The SPMI obtained official write-in status certification of the Socialist Party's 2008 presidential ticket of Brian Moore and Stewart Alexander and its 2012 presidential ticket of Stewart Alexander and Alejandro Mendoza.

In 2006, Matthew Erard, then a student at the University Michigan and chairman of the SPMI, ran for the 53rd district of the Michigan House of Representatives. Because the Socialist Party was not officially recognized by the state government, Erard was officially running without party affiliation. Erard received 847 votes (2.51%) in the general election. Erard sought the same office two years later and was endorsed by both the Socialist Party of Michigan and the Green Party of Michigan. He appeared on the Green Party ballot line and increased both the total number of votes earned (2,200) and overall percentage (4.55%). Erard appeared on conservative talk radio station WJR, where he defended socialist politics and economic ideas.

In July 2010, the party filed a lawsuit against the Michigan Secretary of State challenging the constitutionality of the Michigan statute governing the ballot qualification of political parties, and arguing that it has legally satisfied the criteria for ballot qualification under the governing statute's enacted requirements. The party's lawsuit is pending an application for leave to the Michigan Supreme Court. In conjunction with its legal claims, the Party filed documents with the Michigan Secretary of State to certify the nomination of seven member candidates for state and federal office in the 2010 General Election. However, the Michigan Secretary of State certified the ballot qualification of only those two candidates, among its 2010 nominees, who had subsequently obtained the Green Party of Michigan's back-up nomination for the same 2010 offices.

The SPMI twice consecutively hosted the Socialist Party USA's biennial National Organizing Conference — in August 2006 in Detroit and July 2008 in Ann Arbor. The SPMI has a chartered local in Metro Detroit and has, in recent years, also had chartered locals in the counties of Kalamazoo, Marquette and Washtenaw. The SPMI is also a founding member of the Michigan Third Parties Coalition.

In 2016, the party's presidential nominee, Mimi Soltysik, was nominated by the ballot-qualified Natural Law Party. The party also endorsed party member Michael Anderson's campaign for the Michigan House of Representatives (District 70). Anderson ran on the Green Party of Michigan's ballot line.

== Prominent members ==
- Dennis E. Batt
- Oakley C. Johnson
- Matt Erard
- Max Goldfarb
- John Keracher
- Cyril Lambkin
- Al Renner
- Victor Reuther
- Walter Reuther
- W.E. "Bud" Reynolds
- Alexander M. Rovin
- Maurice Sugar
