= Dennis E. Batt =

American journalist and activist

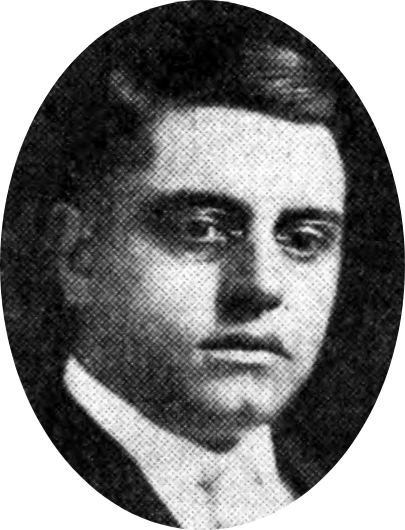
Batt c. 1922

Dennis E. Batt (May 2, 1886 - January 20, 1941) was an American political journalist and trade union activist. Best remembered as the first editor of The Communist, the official organ of the Communist Party of America and leading member of the Proletarian Party of America, in later years Batt's political views became increasingly conservative and he ended his life as a mainstream functionary in the union movement.

== Biography ==
=== Early years ===
Dennis Elihu Batt was born May 2, 1886, in Tekonsha, Michigan, the son of a street car conductor.

Batt attended high school in Detroit for two years before enlisting in the U.S. Cavalry, in which he served from 1907 to 1910. Following the end of his military service, Batt became a machinist, working as a tool and die maker for the next decade.

=== Political career ===
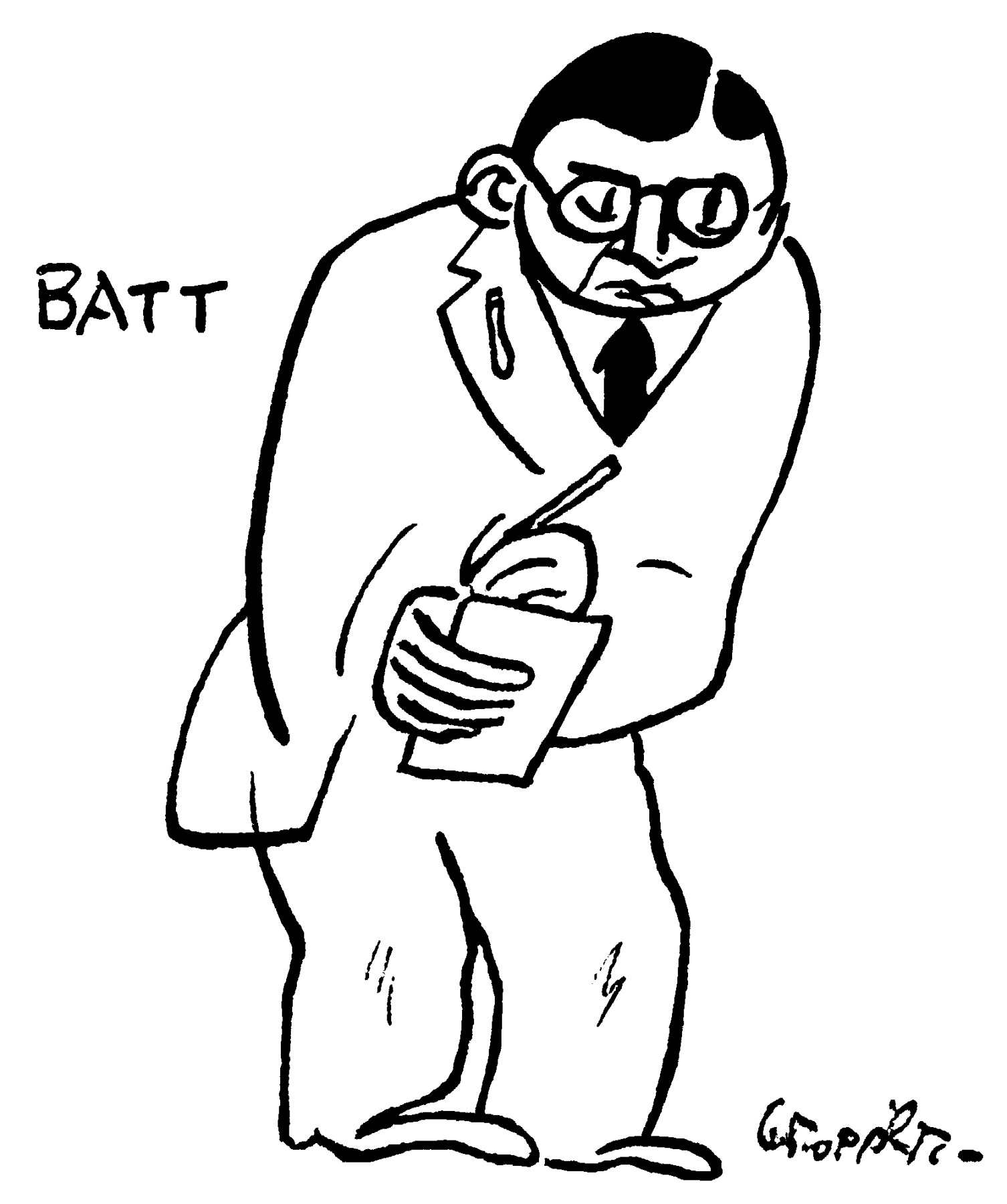
Caricature of Dennis Batt at the founding convention of the Workers Party of America (Dec. 1921) by William Gropper.

During his time as a machinist, Batt joined the Socialist Party of Michigan, the state affiliate of the Socialist Party of America (SPA). There he came under the influence of John Keracher, an immigrant from Scotland who espoused the doctrine of impossibilism — a belief that ameliorative reforms only stood to bolster the capitalist system and that the socialist movement should limit itself to the education and training of workers for the inevitable overthrow of capitalism. Batt became closely involved with Keracher and his associates in winning control of the Socialist Party of Michigan to these ends.

At its 1919 state convention, the Socialist Party of Michigan passed an amendment to its constitution specifying the expulsion of "any member, Local, or Branch of a Local advocating legislative reforms." This put the constitution of the state in conflict with the constitution of the national Socialist Party and provided a pretext for the more moderate National Executive Committee of the SPA to revoke the charter of the Socialist Party of Michigan at its May 24, 1919, session. An emergency convention was held by the Michigan group, which determined to lend their support to the establishment of a new political organization.

In June 1919, Batt was among five delegates from the Socialist Party of Michigan who attended the National Conference of the Left Wing in New York City. This gathering of adherents of the Left Wing Section of the Socialist Party was deeply divided as to whether they should continue to fight for control of the Socialist Party against a well-entrenched and hostile party leadership. Batt, Keracher, and the other Michigan delegates sided with the seven suspended foreign language federations of the SPA in arguing for the immediate establishment of a new communist party. The majority of the conference rejected this appeal, however, and as a result September 1919 saw the formation of two rival organizations, the Communist Party of America — supported by the Michigan group — and the Communist Labor Party of America, launched by Alfred Wagenknecht, L.E. Katterfeld, and John Reed when the attempt to win control of the 1919 Emergency National Convention of the SPA failed.

Batt was named National Secretary of the Organizing Committee for the new Communist Party of America (CPA) and the editor of The Communist, the weekly publication of that committee. At the founding convention of the CPA, held in Chicago, Batt was sensationally arrested on the floor of the gathering by Illinois authorities serving an arrest warrant for Batt's having allegedly having violated the state's sedition laws as editor of The Communist.

Early in 1920, the Michigan group headed by Keracher and Batt broke with the Communist Party over the group's decision to go "underground" in the face of the mass arrests known to history as the Palmer Raids. The Michigan group established their own political organization, the Proletarian Party of America, with Batt named the group's first National Secretary and editor of its monthly publication, a magazine called The Proletarian.

In 1921, Batt was dispatched to Moscow to attend the founding congress of the Red International of Labor Unions. He also attended the 3rd World Congress of the Communist International as a guest, making an attempt to win recognition for the Proletarian Party as the American section of that organization.

Upon returning to America, Batt was elected to the Executive Board of the Detroit Federation of Labor. He was also elected President of Lodge 82 of the International Association of Machinists in 1922 as well as the President of District 60 of that organization. In conjunction with these roles, Batt assumed the editorship of Detroit Labor News, the official publication of the Detroit Federation.

Batt was a delegate to the first general meeting of the Conference for Progressive Political Action (CPPA), held in Cleveland in December 1922, where as a delegate of the Detroit Federation of Labor he defended the right of the rival Workers Party of America to participate in the gathering over the objections of the CPPA's leaders.

=== Later years ===
Batt's position in the Detroit Federation of Labor brought him into conflict with Keracher and the Proletarian Party, and he was expelled from the organization in the first half of the 1920s.

=== Death and legacy ===
Batt died on January 20, 1941, after a series of heart attacks complicated by pneumonia.

== Works ==
- The Batt-Dannenberg Debate on Resolved, that by Political Action Alone, Without the Assistance of the Socialist Industrial Union, the Workers can Emancipate Themselves ... Between Dennis E. Batt, Representing the Socialist Party, and Karl Dannenberg, Representing the Workers' International Industrial Union. Detroit: Literature Bureau of the Workers' International Industrial Union, 1919.
- Socialism Debated. With H.H. Ninaino. Chicago: Literature Department, Communist Party, 1919.
- "Left, Right, and Center," The Proletarian [Detroit], v. 2, no. 1 (May 1919), pp. 13–14.
- "Speech at a Mass Meeting: Madison Square Garden — June 10, 1919." Corvallis, OR: 1000 Flowers Publishing, 2006.
- "The Parting of the Ways," The Proletarian [Detroit], v. 2, no. 3 (July 1919), pp. 3–4.
- "Letter to the Comintern from the Representative of the Proletarian Party of America." Corvallis, OR: 1000 Flowers Publishing, 2005.
- "The Third International Congress," The Proletarian, [Detroit], v. 3, no. 10 (Nov. 1921), pp. 10–11.
