= Maurice Sugar =

American lawyer

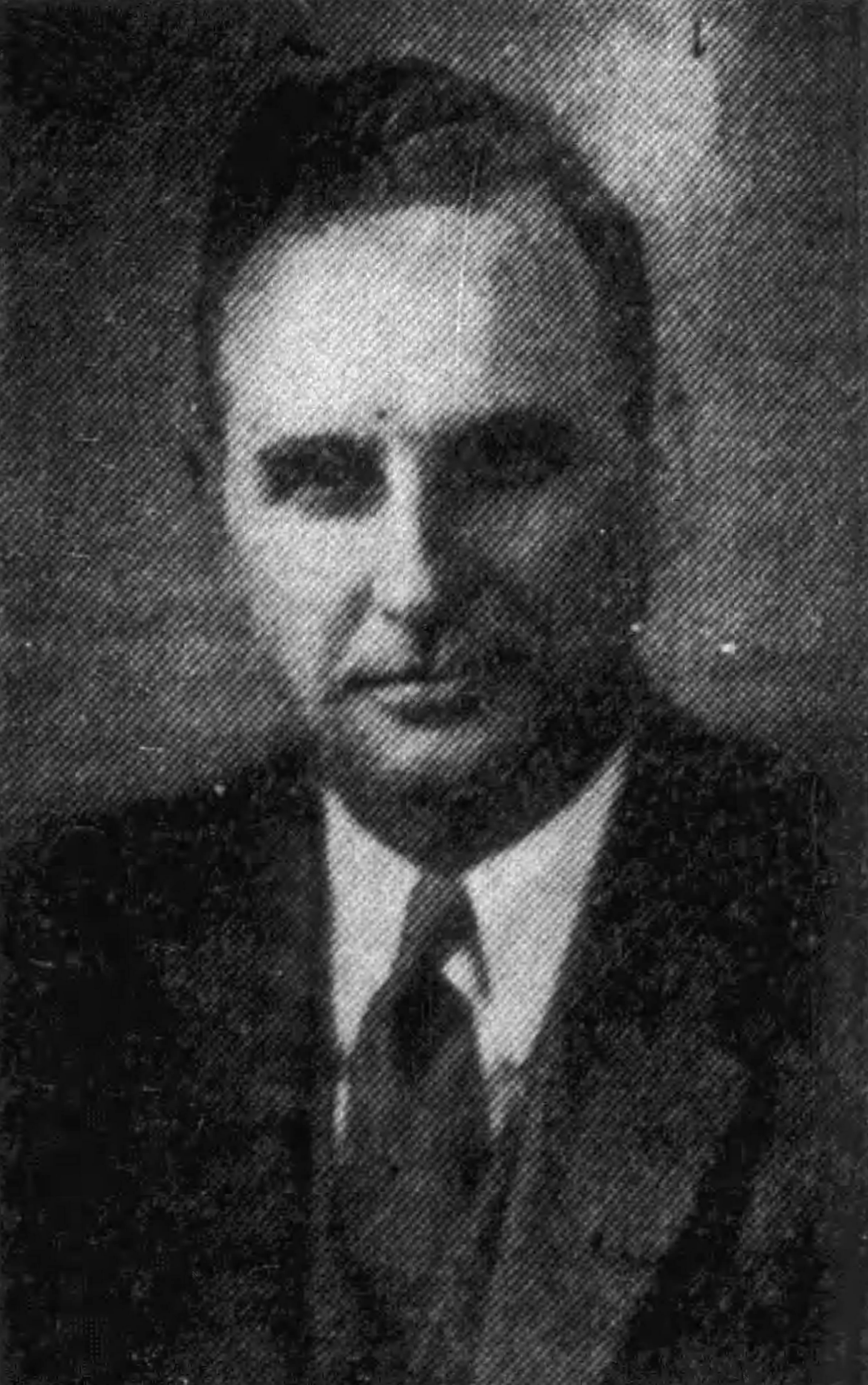
Sugar c. 1937

Maurice Sugar (August 8, 1891 – February 15, 1974) was an American political activist, author and labor attorney. He is best remembered as the General Counsel of the United Auto Workers Union from 1937 to 1946. He joined the National Lawyers Guild soon after it was organized in 1937 and became an active member.

== Early years ==
Maurice Sugar was born August 12, 1891, in Brimley, Michigan (now Superior Township), the son of ethnic Jewish parents who had emigrated to America from Lithuania, which was then part of the Russian Empire. Maurice's father, Kalman Sugar, worked as a storekeeper, selling general provisions.

Maurice's parents were not politically radical, with his father a staunch supporter of populist Democrat William Jennings Bryan in the 1890s. Kalman Sugar eventually joined the Socialist Party of America in 1918, but it was under the influence of his son, not vice versa, as in the more typical case of so-called "red diaper babies."

Growing up in Brimley, Sugar was exposed to the culture of a variety of nationalities, as a large number of immigrants from French Canada, Sweden, Finland, and Germany were employed in the dominant timber industry of Michigan's Upper Peninsula. The cultural diversity left its mark upon him, his biographer notes:

"While Sugar would retain a Jewish identity, growing up in a largely non-Jewish environment created in him a strong melting-pot outlook. But his family associated mainly with fellow immigrants of non-English backgrounds and hence did not seek assimilation in an 'Anglo-conformity' manner... They therefore put a premium on interethnic ties through which they built their identities as Americans."

In the summer of 1900, the Sugar family moved to Detroit, the bustling metropolis on Michigan's eastern shore. The city was in the cusp of an enormous economic boom based around the emerging automobile industry, which would expand from 7200 workers in the city in 1908 to over 100,000 just eight years later. The city boasted a large immigrant population, including many who had left poverty and repression in the Russian empire; some 88 percent of all Russian immigrants in Detroit were Jews. The reason for the Sugars' move was not cultural, however, but related to the belief of his parents that Maurice and his sister and brothers were being poorly educated in Brimley. The family store was left in the hands of one of Maurice's brothers, while Maurice's father invested in a Detroit clothing store.

Brimley was in a state of economic decline, however, with the International Paper Company pulling up stakes on its Brimley facility in 1903 and a recession hitting the country in 1906. In an effort to save the floundering family store in Brimley, the Sugars returned in 1906. Maurice was sent with his brothers to Sault Ste. Marie to attend high school.

In September 1910, Sugar enrolled at the University of Michigan in Ann Arbor, studying law. Michigan was chosen for economic reasons: as a state-run school its tuition rate was more affordable than other more prestigious private universities. The school had a 3-year program in law at the time; Sugar completed his course work on schedule, graduating in 1913 with his Bachelor of Laws degree.

While at college, Sugar had met a red-headed tomboy from Grand Rapids, Jane Mayer. Mayer, the socialist daughter of socialists, and Sugar became close, both emotionally and politically, with the pair joining the University of Michigan chapter of the Intercollegiate Socialist Society together. The couple would marry in April 1914.

== Early career ==
Sugar apparently joined the Socialist Party of America (SPA) in 1912 and idolized the party's presidential candidate, Eugene V. Debs. He read socialist literature prolifically and was particularly influenced by the philosophical writings of Joseph Dietzgen as well as the historical studies of Gustavus Myers and Charles Edward Russell.

Following his 1914 marriage, Sugar became increasingly active in the Socialist Party of Michigan, state affiliate of the SPA. He attended the weekly meetings of Local Detroit Socialist Party, which at the time had a membership approaching 2,000. Sugar's verbal skills and mastery of Robert's Rules of Order made him an ideal meeting chairman and his mainstream "Regular" party views made him for some an attractive alternative to the radical "impossibilist" Detroit shoe store owner John Keracher. Sugar gained an additional following on the basis of his measured public lectures on a wide range of social, economic, and political themes. By 1916 both Sugar and his wife Jane Mayer had become recognized leaders in the local and state Socialist Party.

In 1916, Sugar ran for public office for the first time, standing as the SPA's candidate for District Attorney in Wayne County. Sugar won more votes than any other candidate on the Socialist ticket in the county, accumulating 3,681 votes — more even than Socialist presidential candidate Allan L. Benson, who received 3,236 votes.

Sugar's role as a prominent local as a critic of capitalist excess and advocate for the socialist cause brought him to the attention of the Detroit local of the International Typographical Union (ITU), which was seeking more energetic courtroom representation than their current attorney had been providing. Embroiled in a strike and in the need of legal services, ITU Local 18 hired the young Sugar as its new permanent attorney — his first serious client. The experience he gained in the ITU's strike gave him publicity and access to other unions. While up to that time only a few attorneys had made "labor law" their specialty, such as Morris Hillquit and Louis Waldman in New York, Sugar soon decided to make the law as it related to trade unions a professional specialty.

In 1917, Sugar was a delegate to the 1917 Emergency National Convention of the Socialist Party, held in St. Louis. There he was elected to the convention's Ways and Means Committee and voted in favor of the party's controversial anti-militarist manifesto.

== Conscription issue ==
With American entry into World War I, the main fight for the Socialist Party in Detroit and across the country became the battle against the war and military conscription. Immediately after the declaration of war, a bill calling for a military draft had been introduced in Congress, which was passed and signed into law by President Woodrow Wilson on May 17, 1917. Unlike in many other parts of the country, the labor movement in Detroit did not simply fall in line behind the war effort, with Printers Local 18 and prominent individual labor leaders condemning the war. The official publication of the American Federation of Labor's Detroit city federation filed to print declarations by AF of L leadership in favor of the war effort and in June the Detroit federation voted to endorse the anti-draft position of the People's Council for Peace and Democracy. Only direct pressure by the keeper of the purse, AF of L President Samuel Gompers, forced them to later rescind this decision.

Sugar himself refused to register for the draft during World War I. He was indicted, convicted and sentenced to a year in prison. As a result, he was disbarred. He was readmitted to the bar in 1923 through the efforts of Frank Murphy, who was later to become governor of Michigan and a US Supreme Court justice. He did legal work for many AFL locals.

== Depression years ==
In 1932, he represented survivors of the Ford Hunger March. He visited the Soviet Union in 1933 and made a nationwide lecture tour to 40 cities after his return.

In 1934, Sugar defended James Victory, an African-American veteran of World War I who was accused of slashing the face of a white woman in an alley and stealing her purse. By exposing the weakness of the prosecution's case, and the strength of Victory's alibi, Sugar won an acquittal.

Following the successful sitdown strike by the United Auto Workers in Flint, Michigan that unionized General Motors, Sugar wrote the pro-union song "Sit Down, Sit Down." Recorded with the Manhattan Chorus on 29 April 1937, the song encourages union members to hold a sitdown strike in response to mistreatment by company bosses. He also joined the National Lawyers Guild in 1937, soon after the Guild was first organized.

== Later years ==
Sugar retired from active practice in 1950, and lived on Black Lake in northern Michigan. He remained active in the affairs of the National Lawyers Guild after his retirement.

== Death and legacy ==
Maurice Sugar died on February 15, 1974, in Waverly, Michigan. He was 82 years old at the time of his death.

Sugar's papers, consisting of over 60 linear feet of material, are housed at the Walter P. Reuther Library at Wayne State University in Detroit.

== Works ==
- Working Class Justice: A Popular Treatise on the Law of Injunctions in Labor Disputes. Detroit: Detroit Federation of Labor, 1916.
- The Auto Workers Tell the President Plenty! Statement to Presidential Board at Hearing on Automobile Industry in Detroit, December 16, 1934. Detroit: Committee for Maurice Sugar For Judge of Recorder's Court, n.d. [c. 1935].
- A Negro on Trial for his Life : The Frame-up of James Victory Exposed! Speech to Jury by Counsel for Defense Maurice Sugar, Candidate for Judge of Recorder's Court. Detroit: Committee for Maurice Sugar For Judge of Recorder's Court, n.d. [1935].
- A Guide to the Preparation of By-laws for Local Unions of UAW-CIO. Detroit: UAW-CIO Education Dept., 1944.
- The Ford Hunger March Berkeley, CA: Meiklejohn Civil Liberties Institute, 1980, ISBN 978-0-913876-15-2

== Archival collections ==
The Maurice Sugar Papers are held by the Walter P. Reuther Library of Labor and Urban Affairs at Wayne State University in Detroit. The 60.5 linear feet of papers include Sugar's personal and autobiographical materials files and material relating to his work as chief legal counsel for the United Automobile Workers. Topics covered include UAW legal matters and factionalism, the Ford Hunger March, the House Un-American Activities Committee, and radical politics.

Papers pertaining to Maurice Sugar's work with the National Lawyers Guild can be found in the National Lawyers Guild Records at the Bancroft Library at University of California, Berkeley.

The Bentley Historical Library at the University of Michigan holds a small collection of Maurice Sugar correspondence.
