= Marxist Workers Party =

Communist political party in the United States

- Abbreviation: MWP
- Founded: 1937
- Dissolved: 1940
- Split from: Proletarian Party of America
- Ideology: Trotskyism
- Political position: Far-left

The Marxist Workers Party was a Trotskyist communist party in the United States.

The MWP was a splinter group of the Proletarian Party, which left in 1937 because they disapproved of the PP vacillating line concerning the USSR and the popular front. The founders of the Marxist Workers Party were more critical of the Communist Party of Soviet Union line and, while granting that the USSR was, in some sense, a workers state, they had no use for the Comintern or the Communist Party. The new organization kept, however, some of the Proletarian Party's other characteristics, including an emphasis on Marxist education; hence its establishment of Marxian Labor Colleges in San Francisco, Chicago and Flint, Michigan.

The group's first periodical was the Marxian Labor College Bulletin in San Francisco. This was moved to Chicago in 1939 and became The Marxist Review in 1940. The organization seems to have become defunct that year.

== See also ==
- Marxist Workers League (US)
