= Oakley C. Johnson =

American political activist (1890–1976)

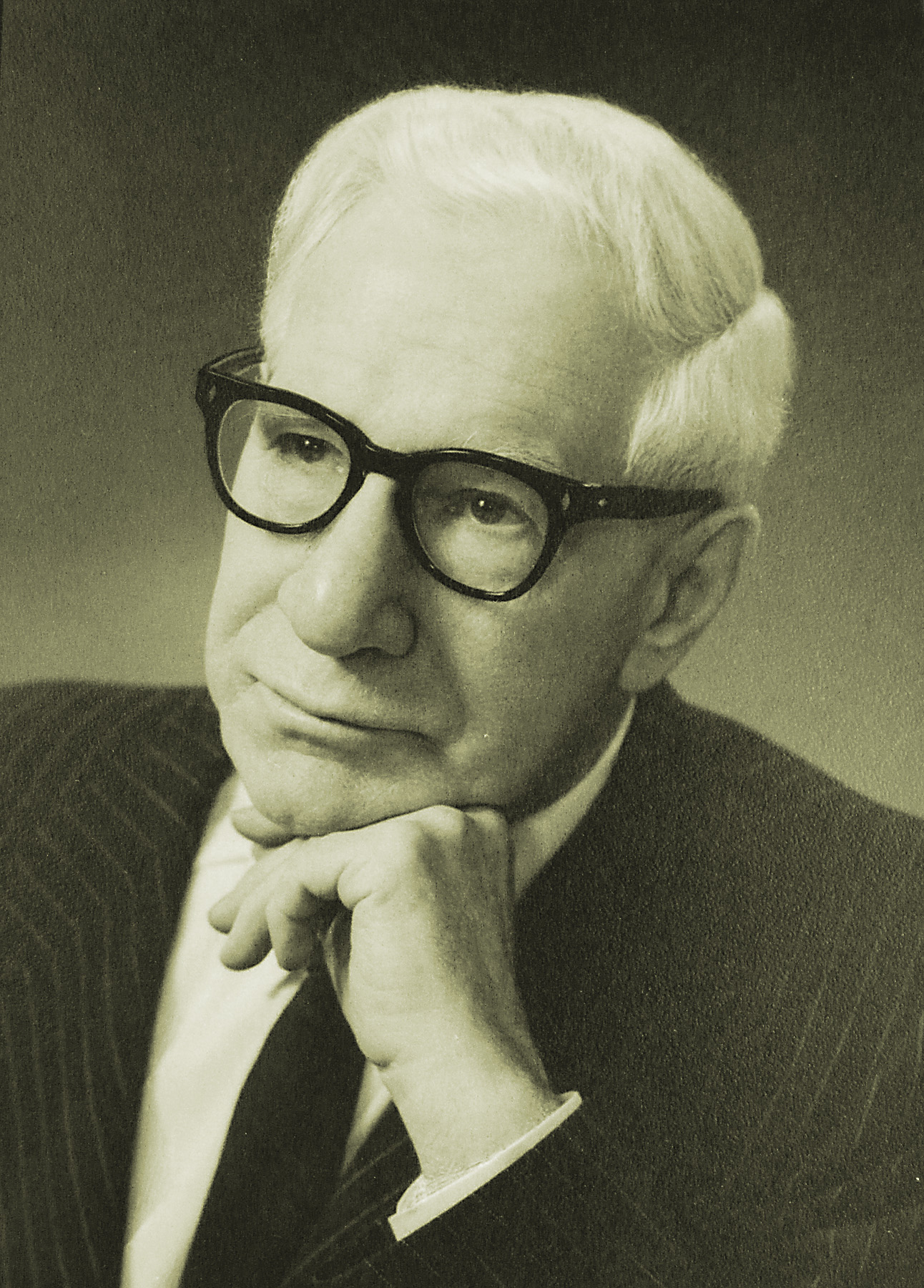
- Born: March 24, 1890; Jarvis Centre, Arenac County, Michigan, US
- Died: August 1976 (aged 86)
- Education: University of Michigan (1920)
- Occupations: Socialist political activist; writer
- Political party: Proletarian Party of America; Communist Party USA
- Other political affiliations: Socialist Party of America

Oakley Calvin Johnson (March 24, 1890 – August 1976) was an American socialist political activist and writer. A founding member of both the Communist Party of America and the Proletarian Party of America, Johnson is best remembered as a historian of the radical politics of that era.

== Biography ==
=== Early years ===
Oakley Calvin Johnson was born on March 24, 1890, in a log cabin on a farm near the hamlet of Jarvis Centre, Michigan, in Arenac County. He was the oldest of five children.

Oakley's mother, the former Elizabeth Jane Gibbon, was herself a native Michigander, born in Bay City in 1867. His father, Calvin Henry Johnson, was born in 1858 near Chateaugay, New York, and died of Addison's disease in 1904 at the age of 46, when Oakley was just 14. Both of his parents were of mixed ethnic stock, hailing from English, Irish, Scottish, and German ancestry.

Johnson read extensively as a boy and was drawn to academic pursuits. Upon graduation from high school, Johnson worked in a series of posts as a school principal in various districts in rural Michigan.

Johnson attended Michigan State Normal School in Ypsilanti, Michigan, from which he graduated in 1917.

After finishing at Michigan State Normal School, Johnson took a position as a principal at Grant High School in Ypsilanti. Midway through the school year, Johnson was pulled right from a classroom by representatives of the U.S. Department of Justice, who took him away to Grand Rapids, Michigan, to interrogate him about his nationality and the reason he had contributed money to the legal defense fund established to aid members of the Industrial Workers of the World undergoing prosecution.

Johnson refused to be bullied and the next day he called a school assembly at which he told the whole story, writing up the same for publication in the local newspaper.

"From that day, the atmosphere changed," Johnson later recalled:

"The students and the farmers round about were on my side. In June, on the day before graduation, an out-of-town mob gathered at the school house to get me, but my students spirited me and my young wife out the back way, where farmers in automobiles rescued us and gave us hospitality for the night. The next day Professor Hoyt of Ypsilanti gave the graduating address, and expressed regret, I was told, that the mob on the preceding night had to go home empty handed. My graduating class refused to sit on the platform because I was not there. They picked up their diplomas later, after the 'exercises' were over."

Johnson graduated with his bachelor's degree from the University of Michigan in 1920 and received his master's degree the following year. In 1928 he was awarded a doctorate degree in English from the same institution.

Johnson starting teaching at the University of Michigan in Ann Arbor in October 1920, as an instructor in rhetoric. He remained at that institution until June 1928. Johnson received his doctorate degree in that same year.

While at Michigan, Johnson was the faculty advisor to the Negro-Caucasian Club, a student organization which aimed to promote interracial understanding through common activities. The club was organized about 1923 and was granted formal recognition by the administration in March 1926.

The Negro-Caucasian sponsored a series of speakers on campus who discussed relevant topics in public lectures and gave black and white students an opportunity to meet and socialize.

In the fall of 1928, the new Dr. Johnson left Michigan in favor of a position as an assistant professor of English at Long Island University, where he remained until 1930. For the next two years, Johnson taught evenings at College of the City of New York.

=== Political career ===
Johnson joined the Socialist Party of America in 1912. Johnson later recalled that he came to the socialist movement through his participation in school debates — assigned to argue a position of the Democratic Party, Johnson had prepared by reading the perspectives of other organizations, including the Socialists. Soon he was immersed in Marxist literature and subscribing to the major socialist periodicals of the day, including the Appeal to Reason, the National Rip-Saw, and the International Socialist Review.

In 1919, Johnson was elected State Secretary of the Socialist Party of Michigan, remaining in that position until October, when he accepted a job as a librarian at the University of Michigan.

In June 1919, Johnson was a delegate to the National Left Wing Convention held in New York City by the organized Left Wing Section of the Socialist Party, which he attended along with fellow members of the Socialist Party of Michigan John Keracher, Dennis Batt, Al Renner, and A.J. MacGregor .

Afterwards, Johnson became a member of the Communist Party Organizing Committee, the group which handled the arrangements for the founding convention of the Communist Party USA, held in Chicago from September 1 to 7, 1919.

Johnson was a fraternal delegate to the founding convention of the Proletarian Party of America in June 1920.

In the fall of 1933 Johnson stood for election as a Communist candidate for the New York State Assembly in the 9th Assembly District of New York County.

=== Later years ===
Johnson taught in the Communist Party's educational institution in New York City, the New York Workers School, from 1934 to 1935. The next year, Johnson traveled to the Soviet Union to accept a post as Docent in the Department of English at the Institute of Foreign Languages in Moscow, leaving at the end of the academic year in 1936. During his stay in Moscow, Johnson also worked on the staff of the Moscow Daily News.

After his return from the USSR, Johnson returned to the New York Workers School, where he remained until 1942.

In the late 1940s and early 1950s, Johnson spent the next six years teaching at historically black universities in the deep South, including Talladega College in Talladega, Alabama, Dillard University in New Orleans, and Tillotson College in Austin, Texas.

Johnson returned to New York City in the fall of 1952 to accept a position at Brooklyn College to replace a professor who had resigned. He was, however, summarily fired by the college president after just two days because of his political beliefs.

After that date, Johnson continued to teach as a tutor, "confining himself to giving private lessons to those with a foreign background who wish to study the English language," as he himself noted.

=== Legacy ===
Johnson's primary accumulation of papers are housed in the Special Collections Library at Stony Brook University in New York.

Other material is held by the New York Public Library in New York City, available on 5 reels of microfilm.

A smaller collection, heavily skewed towards matter dealing with his participation in the "Negro-Caucasian Club" which existed at the University of Michigan from 1926 to 1927, is housed in the Special Collections Library of the University of Michigan in Ann Arbor. Included in this material is an unpublished autobiography by Johnson, written for his grandchildren in 1965 and entitled Trying to Live "Really Human."

== Works ==
=== Books and articles ===
- The Arguer's Handbook. Ann Arbor, MI: Edwards Brothers, 1928.
- Preventive Remedial English in the Negro Secondary School. n.c.: n.p., n.d. [c. 1949].
- Art. New Orleans: Dillard University, n.d. [c. 1950].
- The Day is Coming: Life and Work of Charles E. Ruthenberg, 1882-1927. New York: International Publishers, 1957. —Also published in Russian.
- The Foreign Agent: Truth and Fiction. New York: Gus Hall-Benjamin J. Davis Defense Committee, 1964.
- Writings by and about Daniel de Leon: A Bibliography. With Carl Reeve. New York: American Institute for Marxist Studies, 1966.
- "The Early Socialist Party of Michigan: An Assignment in Autobiography," The Centennial Review, vol. 10, no. 2 (Spring 1966), pp. 147–162.
- "New Orleans Story." Centennial Review, 1968.
- My Grandson, Steve. New York: Oakley C. Johnson, 1970.
- Marxism in United States History Before the Russian Revolution (1876-1917). New York: Humanities Press, 1974.

=== Edited titles ===
- An American Century: The Recollections of Bertha W. Howe, 1866-1966. New York: AIMS/Humanities Press, 1966.
- Robert Owen in the United States. New York: n.p., 1970.
