= Proletarian Party of America =

American left-wing political party (1920–1971)

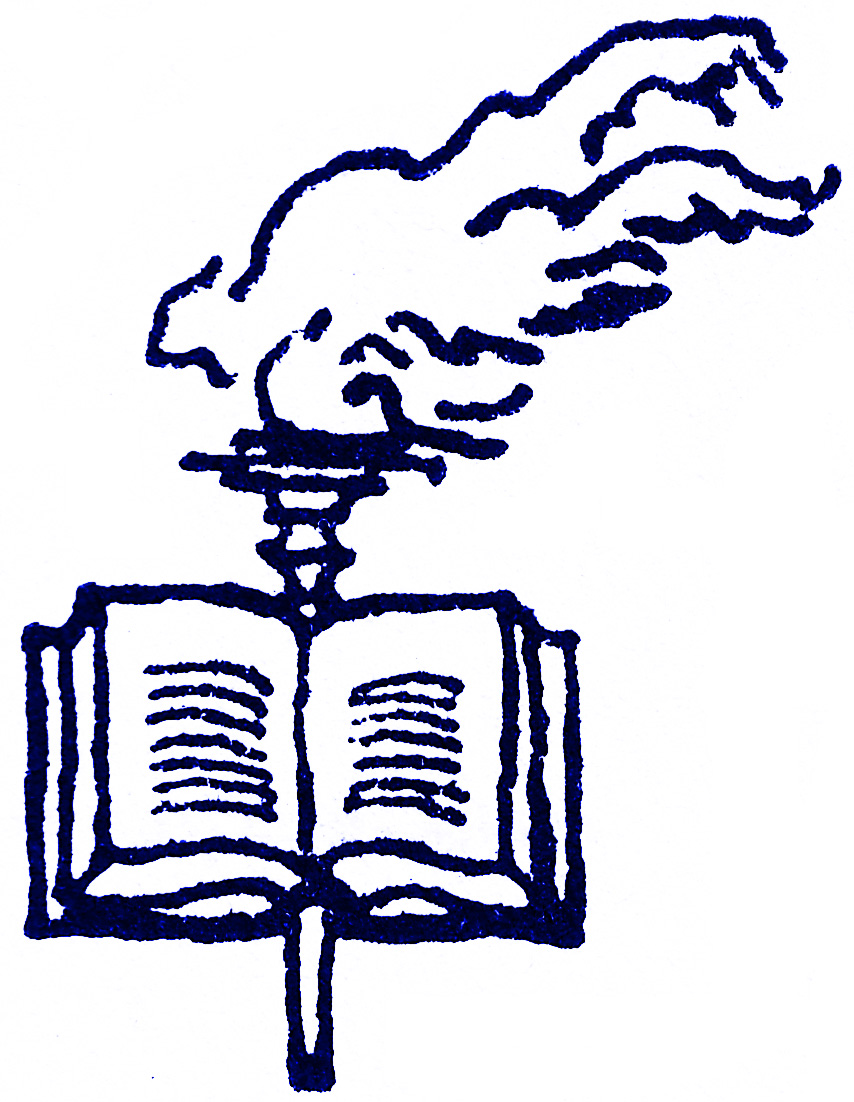
- Founder: John Keracher; Dennis Batt; Al Renner; H. M. Wicks; Oakley C. Johnson
- Founded: 27 June 1920
- Dissolved: 1971
- Split from: Communist Party of America
- Preceded by: Socialist Party of Michigan
- Ideology: Communism; Marxism; Impossibilism
- Political position: Far-left

The Proletarian Party of America (PPA) was a small communist political party in the United States, forming in 1920 and disbanding in 1971. Originally an offshoot of the Communist Party of America, the group maintained an independent existence for over five decades. It is best remembered for carrying forward Charles H. Kerr & Co., the oldest U.S. publisher of Marxist books.

== Organizational history ==
=== Formation ===
Al Renner was a key figure in the Proletarian Party of America during its formative period.

The Proletarian Party of America (PPA) emerged in 1920 from the Socialist Party of Michigan, but the organization's story dates back to the World War I years. At that time the Michigan Socialist Party, the state affiliate of the Socialist Party of America (SPA), was won over to a unique Left Wing ideology.

The key figure in the Michigan organization was a Scottish-born owner of a small Detroit shoe store, John Keracher. He had been influenced by the "impossibilist" Scottish socialist tradition associated with Daniel De Leon. Keracher partnered with tool-and-die maker Dennis Batt and radical activists Al Renner and H. M. Wicks. At Keracher's behest, the Socialist Party of Michigan favored Marxist theoretical study as the best method to prepare the working class for the task of revolutionary leadership. Throughout 1918 and 1919, the party established a network of Marxist study circles called the "Proletarian University", with the worker education movement being particularly strong in Detroit, Chicago, and Rochester.

At the 1919 State Convention of the Socialist Party of Michigan, Keracher was elected party leader. An amendment was adopted by the delegates calling for the expulsion of anyone who engaged in electoral politics. Keracher, Batt, and other Michigan Party members were also prominent in the Left Wing Section of SPA, a group inspired by the Russian Revolution that was attempting to win control of the national organization.

The Left Wing Section organized candidate slates for each of SPA's electoral districts, and made use of bloc voting by sympathetic branches of the party's language federations to achieve victories. SPA's outgoing National Executive Committee (NEC) cried election fraud, and refused to tally the results of the 1919 party election or to leave office on July 1, the appointed date. Instead, the NEC went on the offensive with a series of suspensions of language federations and the expulsion of the Michigan party, ostensibly for violating SPA's constitution by repudiating legislative reforms at its 1919 State Convention.

Keracher and the Michigan socialists allied with the suspended language federations in calling for immediate formation of a Communist Party of America, as opposed to the idea advocated by the NEC's Alfred Wagenknecht and L.E. Katterfeld of continuing the fight at the 1919 SPA Emergency National Convention, scheduled for August 30 in Chicago. Wagenknecht, Katterfeld, and their associates wound up bolting the Emergency National Convention to establish the Communist Labor Party of America, while Keracher, Batt, and the federations founded the rival Communist Party of America. Two years of bitter struggle followed between these competing Communist organizations.

Proletarian Party leader John Keracher as he appeared in the 1940s.

The idiosyncratic Michiganders were a poor match for the disciplined Communists of the federations led by Alexander Stoklitsky, Oscar Tyverovsky, and Nicholas Hourwich of the Russian Communist Federation and Joseph Stilson of the Lithuanian Communist Federation. Early in 1920, a split ensued, due in part to the insistence by the Michigan group that they maintain the Proletarian University outside of the control of the Central Executive Committee. In the recollections of the Communist Party's Executive Secretary, C.E. Ruthenberg, the key reason for the split stemmed from the CP's decision to go "underground" after the Palmer Raids of January 1920:

The Proletarian group was still part of the Communist Party in January 1920 after the raids. I personally went to Detroit to reorganize the CP and conferred with [Al] Renner, [A.J.] MacGregor, and [John] Keracher. They refused to become part of an underground party. They were dropped out of the CP in February 1920 because they refused to have any part in the reorganization.

The expelled Michigan socialists would soon establish themselves as the Proletarian Party of America.

From 1921–23, the Communist International attempted to bring the PPA into America's mainstream Communist Party movement, but "the Proletarians stubbornly pursued their own course". In 1922 the unified CPUSA tried to recruit the PPA into its legal arm, the Workers Party of America, but to no avail; the PPA also rebuffed an invitation to participate in the Trade Union Educational League.

=== The Proletarian Party and Charles H. Kerr & Co. ===
Keracher's work with the Proletarian University had brought him into close contact with Charles H. Kerr, founder of the Chicago-based Charles H. Kerr & Co., the largest Marxist publishing house in the U.S. In 1924, Keracher became a member of the Kerr Company's Board of Directors. At roughly this time, the PPA moved its headquarters from Detroit to Chicago. In 1928, when Charles Kerr retired, he sold his controlling shares in the company to Keracher. Thereafter, the PPA ran Charles H. Kerr & Co. Among their published works were several pamphlets by Keracher, including How the Gods Were Made (1929), Producers and Parasites (1935), The Head-Fixing Industry (1935), Crime: Its Causes and Consequences (1937), and Frederick Engels (1946).

Owing to poor finances, the PPA published few other new Charles H. Kerr & Co. titles. The publishing company was gradually reduced to a small mail-order firm.

H. M. Wicks wound up returning to the Communist Party of America, where he was known as a bitter factionalist. Dennis Batt retired from radical politics after a time, to become a labor journalist and staunch supporter of the American Federation of Labor. The banner of the PPA and Charles H. Kerr & Co. was carried forward by Al Wysocki following Keracher's retirement as National Secretary in 1954.

=== Publications ===
Proletarian News was the final publication produced by the PPA, terminating in July 1960.

The official organ of the PPA was a monthly magazine called The Proletarian, which started as a news-sheet for the left-wing faction inside the Socialist Party of Michigan. The Proletarian was launched in May 1918 and continued to be issued each month until July 1931, when it was superseded by Proletarian News, likewise a monthly, which began in 1932 and ceased publication in May 1961. During its final years, Proletarian News was produced via mimeograph owing to the small size of the party membership.

From June to September 1923, the PPA had briefly experimented with a four-page weekly newspaper, Labor Digest, but it lasted only twelve issues due to the financial drain it was causing. The PPA also published an irregular mimeographed internal discussion newsletter called Proletarian Bulletin, as well as a short-lived publication for its youth section, Proletarian Youth.

=== Electoral politics ===
The Proletarian Party periodically ran its own candidates for electoral office, especially in Michigan where it retained some organizational viability. In 1932 the party backed two candidates for statewide office: Al Renner for Governor and Anthony Bielekas for Secretary of State.

=== Decline and demise ===
PPA dues stamps, circa 1950s. Dues then cost $1 per month, with the stamps affixed to party cards and cancelled to denote dues having been paid.

The party suffered two known splits in the 1930s. In the first one, a faction of the party's youth group split off in the early 1930s; they joined with a group of German Left Communists to form the United Workers Party, which soon changed its name to the Council Communists. In 1937, a group disagreeing with the PPA's policy toward the Soviet Union split off to form the Marxist Workers Party.

In 1953, Al Wysocki succeeded John Keracher as National Secretary of the PPA. The organization remained based in Chicago, but showed a steady decline in interest and participation, withering to the point that by 1964 only two locals remained — Chicago and Flint, Michigan.

The PPA was effectively terminated with the death of National Secretary Wysocki in 1971.

=== Legacy ===
The papers of the Proletarian Party of America are housed in the Special Collections department of the University of Michigan at Ann Arbor. The materials include correspondence files, newspaper clippings, financial documents, publications, and printer's slugs for original artwork.

== Prominent members ==
- Dennis E. Batt
- Milton V. Breitmayer
- Christ Jelset
- Oakley C. Johnson
- John Keracher
- A. J. MacGregor
- Stanley Nowak and Margaret Collingwood Nowak
- Charles M. O'Brien
- Al Renner
- Alexander M. Rovin
- H. M. Wicks
- Al Wysocki

== See also ==
- Charles H. Kerr Publishing Company

== Publications ==
- The Proletarian. Detroit and Chicago. (1918-1931) —Tabloid monthly newspaper in 1918, thereafter monthly magazine.
- Proletarian News. Chicago. (1931-1961) —Tabloid monthly newspaper, later mimeographed.
- Labor Digest. Chicago. (June to Sept. 1923) —Short-lived broadsheet propaganda paper.
- Proletarian Bulletin. San Francisco, CA. —Mimeographed internal discussion bulletin.
