= Young Communist League USA =

American communist youth organization

Young Communist League of the United States of America
- Founded: 1920 (first installment); 2019 (second installment)
- Headquarters: 235 W 23rd St, New York, NY 10011, Manhattan, New York
- Ideology: Communism; Marxism–Leninism; Bill of Rights socialism Socialism
- Mother party: Communist Party USA
- International affiliation: WFDY
- Website: www.youngcommunists.org

The Young Communist League USA (YCLUSA) is a communist youth organization in the United States and the youth wing of the Communist Party USA. The stated aim of the League is the development of its members into Communists, through studying socialism and through active participation in the struggles of the American working class. Although the name of the group changed a number of times during its existence, its origins trace back to 1920, shortly after the establishment of the first communist parties in the United States.

On November 14, 2015, the CPUSA's National Committee voted to suspend funding to the Young Communist League and the organization was subsequently dissolved.

In 2019, at the 31st party convention, the organization was re-established.

== History ==
=== The underground period ===
As early as 1920, a skeleton of a "Young People's Communist League" was in existence. This minuscule, largely paper organization sent a fraternal delegate to the 2nd Convention of the United Communist Party, held at Kingston, New York from December 24, 1920, to January 2, 1921. A report was delivered by this delegate on the youth situation in America and the convention at this time first decided to establish a serious youth section, to be called the Young Communist League. The resolution passed by the convention pledged the UCP would provide its youth section assistance by helping to produce and distribute its literature, by helping to gain control of existing units of the Independent YPSL and organizing them into communist groups, by helping to organize new units, by providing it financial assistance, by lending it speakers and teachers, and by allotting it space in the official party periodicals.

This did not mean that there was no national convention of the organization. The founding convention of the YCL was held early in May 1922, apparently in Bethel, Connecticut. It was a small and low key gathering, including just fourteen delegates from four of the Communist Party's twelve national districts. The gathering heard a report from Max Bedacht of the adult party dealing with the discussions and decisions of the 3rd World Congress of the Communist International and its February 1922 special conference. The convention adopted a constitution and a program for the YCL, as well as a resolution delineating the relationship of the youth league with the adult party. A governing National Executive Committee of five members was elected. The initiation fee to join the YCL was 50 cents and dues were 25 cents per month, receipted with stamps issued by the National Office. The basic unit of organization was the "group" consisting, ideally, of from five to ten members and meeting at least every other week. Groups elected their own captains to coordinate their activities with the center. Multiple groups were parts of a "section" of up to five groups; multiple sections were part of a "sub-district," which was in turn a subdivision of the regular geographic "districts" of the Communist Party.

=== Establishment of the "overground" organization ===
Logo of the YWL, established in 1922.

YWL leader Nat Ganley summarized the difference between his communist group and others by stating: "Let us remember that is it mainly on this point that we differ from the old form of child organization – the worker's Sunday schools. We are not only preparing the child for future participation in class struggle–we are leading the child in the class struggle now!"

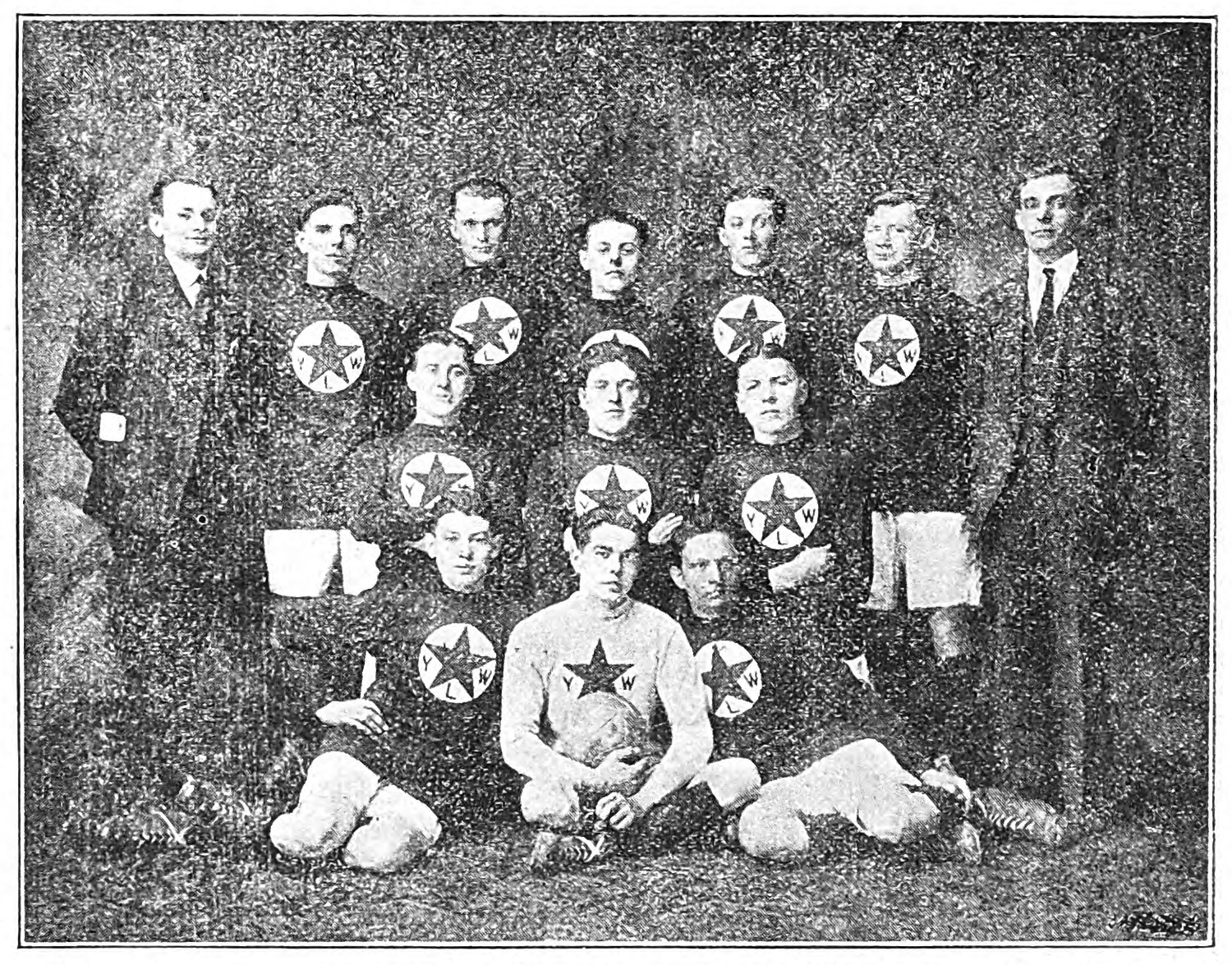
The Karl Liebknecht branch of the YWL Chicago soccer team c. 1923

The founding convention of the YWL was held in Brooklyn, New York from May 13 to 15, 1922, held appropriately enough at Finnish Socialist Hall. Oliver Carlson delivered the keynote speech to the thirty regular and five fraternal delegates. Carlson claimed a presence for the nascent YWL in forty-six cities and a membership of "at the very least," 2,200.

The basic unit of organization of the YWL was the branch, which consisted of at least five but no more than one hundred and fifty members. Two or more branches in a single large city were to form a "City Central Committee" to coordinate their activities, and all units were to be part of the regular array of districts used by the adult party. The initiation fee was 25 cents and dues 25 cents per month, with all initiation fees and 10 cents of every month's dues going to support the National Office.

=== The depression decade and after ===
On October 17, 1943, the YCL convened in national convention in New York City, passed a resolution dissolving itself, and immediately reconvened under a new organizational name, the American Youth for Democracy (AYD). This predated a similar move transforming the adult Communist Party, USA into the "Communist Political Association" by seven months. The change of names proved to be strictly semantic, as all important positions within the "new" AYD were held by former members of the YCL. National Executive Secretary of the AYD at the time of its October 1943 launch was Carl Ross, the former head of the YCL for a period of more than five years.

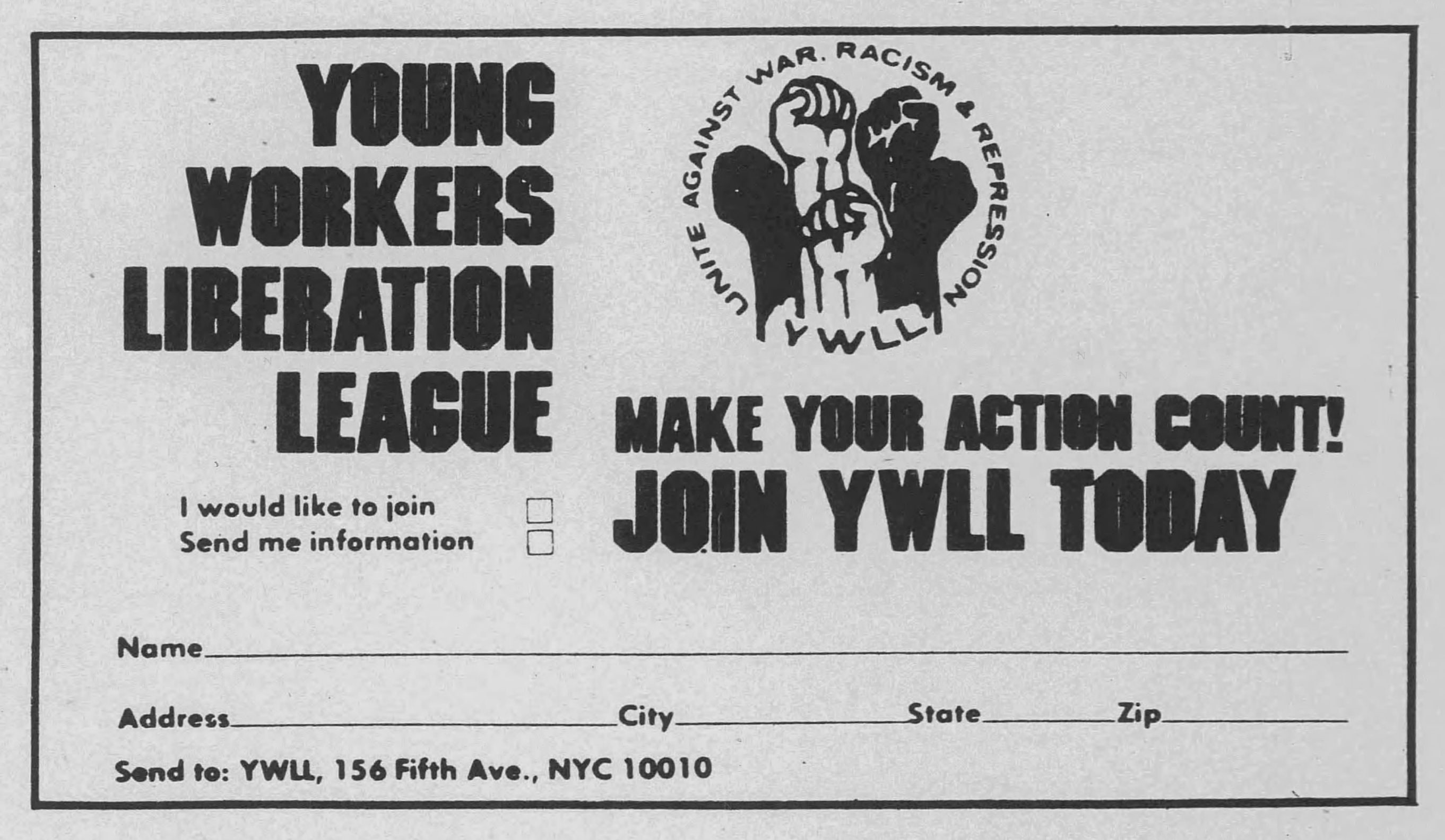
Advertisement for the Young Workers Liberation League published in the Daily World, July 5, 1975

The CPUSA reestablished a youth organization in 1949 as the Labor Youth League, which dissolved in the dissension following the Hungarian Revolution of 1956 and the 20th Congress of the CPSU. In 1965, after a period of mainly local activity, the DuBois Clubs were formed and later renamed the Young Workers Liberation League before reaffirming the original name Young Communist League in 1984.

=== Re-establishment ===
In 2019, a resolution at the 31st National Convention of the CPUSA was passed which called to re-establish the Young Communist League. While the organization has nominally been re-established, it has yet to hold a national congress and no national level organization exists, with state and local level clubs carrying out league functions. In 2023, Alexandra Ocasio-Cortez staffer Justine Medina was reported to be a senior leader in the New York YCL by right-wing media outlets including the New York Post and Fox News. She is no longer part of Ocasio-Cortez's staff.

== See also ==
- W.E.B. DuBois Clubs of America
- Young Democratic Socialists of America
- Worker Rights Consortium
- United Students Against Sweatshops
- Student/Farmworker Alliance
- Students for a Democratic Society
