= Workers Party of America =

- Founded: December 23, 1921
- Dissolved: Mid 1929
- Succeeded by: CPUSA
- Ideology: Communism; Marxism–Leninism
- Political position: Far-left
- International affiliation: Comintern
- Colors: Red

The Workers Party of America (WPA) was the name of the legal party organization used by the Communist Party USA from December 1921 until the middle of 1929.

== Background ==
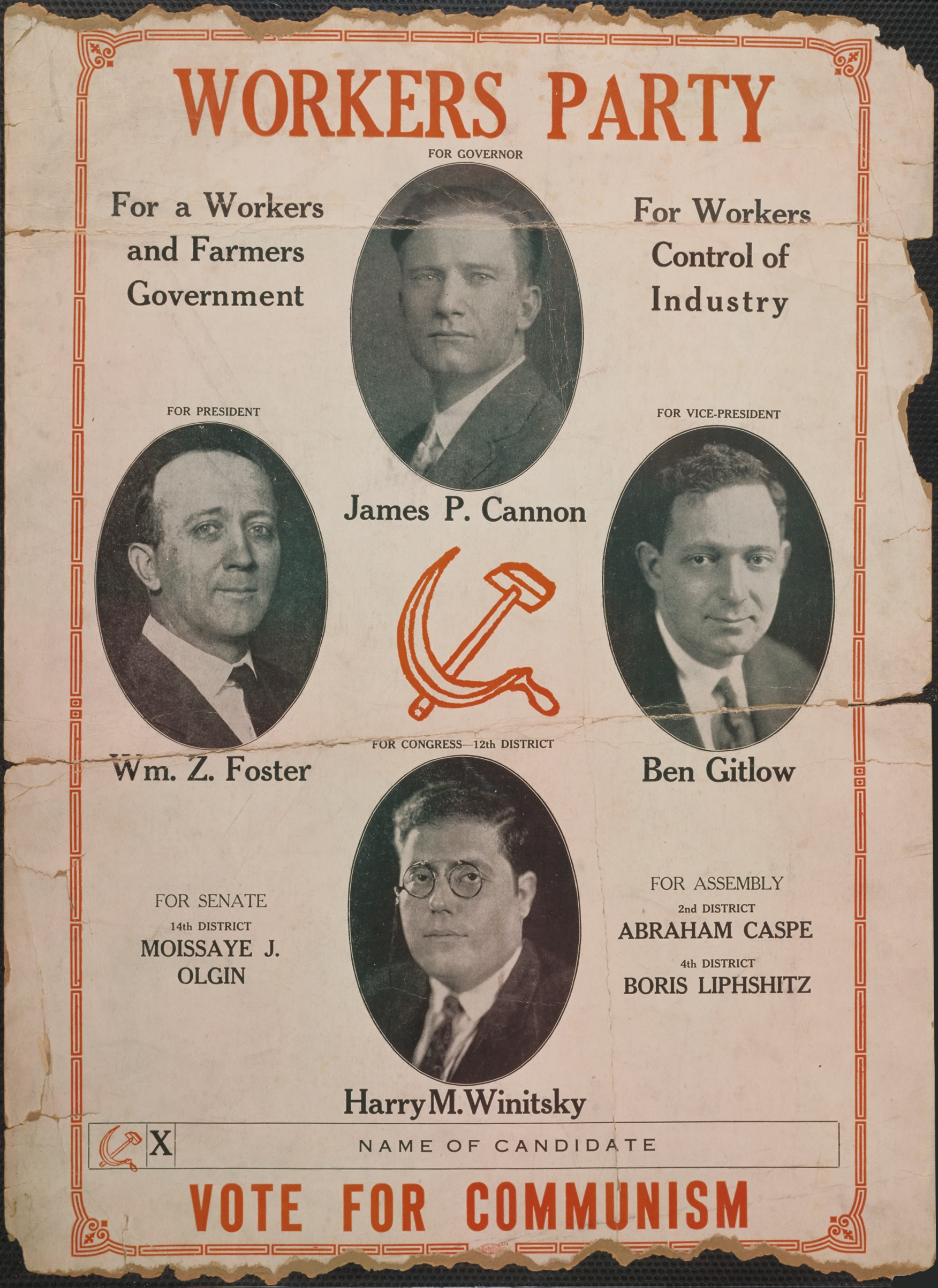
Workers Party campaign poster featuring James P. Cannon, William Z. Foster, Benjamin Gitlow, and Harry Winitsky, 1924

As a legal political party, the Workers Party accepted affiliation from independent socialist groups such as the African Blood Brotherhood, the Jewish Socialist Federation and the Workers' Council of the United States. In the meantime, the underground Communist Party, with overlapping membership, conducted political agitation. By 1923, the aboveground party sought to engage the Socialist Party of America (SPA) in united front actions, but it was rebuffed. Both the WPA and the SPA engaged in separate labor party efforts, prior to the presidential election of 1924. The SPA participated in the Conference for Progressive Political Action, which dissolved itself into the Progressive Party. The WPA succeeded in dominating the national Farmer–Labor Party, but that organization quickly returned to its constituent parts. At its 1925 convention, the group renamed itself the Workers (Communist) Party and in 1929 the Communist Party, USA. The party's youth affiliate was named the Young Workers League, Young Workers (Communist) League and Young Communist League in tandem with the parent organization.

As the Communist International entered the Third Period, the principle of a leftist united front was abandoned in favor of a single above-ground Communist Party. The above-ground Workers Party and underground party were thus gradually merged in a series of party conferences in the late 1920s into the Communist Party USA.

== Convention of Establishment & Principles ==
The convention for the establishment of the party took place on December 23–26, 1921 at the Labor Temple on East 84th Street, New York with 150 delegates.

Accompanying the convention call was a statement of principles which read:

1. The Workers’ Republic: To lead the working masses in the struggle for the abolition of capitalism through the establishment of a government by the working class—a Workers’ Republic in America.

2. Political Action: To participate in all political activities, including electoral campaigns, in order to utilize them for the purpose of carrying our message to the masses. The elected representatives of the Workers Party will unmask the fraudulent capitalist democracy and help mobilize the workers for the final struggle against their common enemy.

3. The Labor Unions: To develop labor organizations into organs of militant struggle against capitalism, expose the reactionary labor bureaucrats, and educate the workers to militant unionism.

4. A Fighting Party: It shall be a party of militant, class conscious workers, bound by discipline and organized on the basis of democratic centralism, with full power in the hands of the Central Executive Committee between conventions. The Central Executive Committee of the Party shall have control over all activities of public officials. It shall also co-ordinate and direct the work of the Party members in the trade unions.

5. Party Press: The Party’s press shall be owned by the Party, and all its activities shall be under the control of the Central Executive Committee.

== Leadership ==
A complete roster of the Workers Party's executive officials elected at its founding convention is not available. Those elected at the December 1922 convention are as follows:

=== Executive Secretary ===
(Elected by Central Executive Committee)

- C. E. Ruthenberg

=== Executive Council (11) ===
(Elected by Central Executive Committee "to function between the sessions of the CEC")

- Alexander Bittelman
- James P. Cannon
- William F. Dunne
- Marion Emerson
- J. Louis Engdahl
- Edward Lindgren
- Ludwig Lore
- Theo Maki
- M. J. Olgin
- C. E. Ruthenberg
- Harry M. Wicks

=== Central Executive Committee (25) ===
(One member elected by the NEC of the YWL)

- Israel Amter
- Max Bedacht
- Alexander Bittelman
- B. Borisoff
- Fahle Burman
- James P. Cannon
- William F. Dunne
- Marion Emerson
- J. Louis Engdahl
- Abraham Jakira
- Ludwig E. Katterfeld
- William F. Kruse
- Edward Lindgren
- Jay Lovestone
- Robert Minor
- A. Nastasievsky
- M. J. Olgin
- John Pepper
- C. E. Ruthenberg
- Rose Pastor Stokes
- Alexander Trachtenberg
- Alfred Wagenknecht
- William W. Weinstone
- Harry M. Wicks
- ??? (YWL)

== Publications ==
Before the party established its own publishing house for books (International Publishers) and pamphlets (Workers Library Publishers), the Workers Party and Workers (Communist) Party published a number of items under its own imprint, or in association with the Daily Worker.

=== Books ===
- Dictatorship vs. Democracy (Terrorism and Communism): A Reply to Karl Kautsky by Leon Trotsky with a preface by H.N. Brailsford, and a foreword by Max Bedact Workers Party Library Vol. I
- The Government -- strikebreaker; a study of the role of the government in the recent industrial crisis. by Jay Lovestone Workers Party of America, New York. May 1, 1923. (The first book published by the party written by an American.) Workers Party Library Vol. II
- ABC of Communism by Nikolai Bukharin and E. Preobraschensky. New York, Lyceum-Literature Dept., Workers Party of America 1922 Vol. I

=== Pamphlets ===
- Program and constitution, Workers Party of America, adopted at national convention, New York City, December 24, 25, 26, 1921. New York, Lyceum and Literature Dept., Workers Party 1922
- Workers, unite for the struggle against the bosses: manifesto of the Workers Party of America. New York: The Party, 1922
- Should communists participate in reactionary trade unions? by N. Lenin New York City: Literature Dept., Workers Party of America, 1922
- For a labor party: recent revolutionary changes in American politics by John Pepper New York: Workers Party of America (three separate editions, the first in fall 1922, the next, substantially revised in spring and summer 1923, but only latter two had authors name).
- Constitution of the Workers Party of America, as amended by the Second National Convention, New York December 24-25 and 26, 1922 n.l., n.d.
- Blood and Steel: An Exposure of the 12-Hour Day in the Steel Industry. by Jay Lovestone New York: Workers Party of America, n.d. [1923].
- What's What About Coolidge? by Jay Lovestone Chicago, Workers Party of America, n.d. [c. 1923].
- The fifth year of the Russian revolution: a report of a lecture by James P. Cannon New York: Workers Party of America 1923.
- American foreign-born workers by Clarissa Ware New York, Workers party of America 1923 alternate linke.
- Strategy of the communists; a letter from the Communist International to the Mexican communist party. Chicago, Workers party of America 1923.
- "Underground radicalism;" an open letter to Eugene V. Debs and to all honest workers within the Socialist Party by John Pepper Workers Party of America, New York [1923].
- Why Every Worker Should Be a Communist and Join the Workers Party by Charles E. Ruthenberg Chicago, Ill.: Workers Party of America, 1923.
- The second year of the Workers Party of America: report of the Central Executive Committee to the Third National Convention held in Chicago, Ill., Dec. 30, 31, 1923 and Jan. 1, 2, 1924: theses, program, resolutions. Chicago: Literature Dept., Workers Party of America 1924.
- Program and constitution Adopted at National Convention, New York City, December 24-25-26-27, 1921. Amended at National Convention, Chicago, Ill., December 30-31, 1923, and January 1, 1924. Chicago: Literature Dept., Workers Party of America 1924.
- Nikolai Lenin: his life and work by Grigory Zinovyev Chicago: Workers Party of America, Mourning ed., Jan., 1924.
- Zyciorys i dzialanosc Mikolaja Lenina by Grigory Zinovyev Chicago: Polskiej Sekcji Robotniczej Partji Ameryki 1924 (Polish).
- Our immediate work: program adopted by the Central Executive Committee of the Workers Party of America Chicago: Literature Dept., Workers Party of America, 1924..
- The Farmer-Labor United Front by Charles E. Ruthenberg. Literature Department, Workers Party of America, Chicago. 1924.
- Parties and Issues in the Election Campaign. by Alexander Bittelman Chicago: Literature Department, Workers Party of America, 1924.
- Unemployment, why it occurs and how to fight it by Earl Browder Chicago, Ill.: Literature Dept., Workers Party of America, 1924.
- The La Follette Illusion: As Revealed in an Analysis of the Political Role of Senator Robert M. La Follette (sic). by Jay Lovestone Chicago: Literature Department, Workers Party of America, 1924.
- The white terrorists ask for mercy Chicago; Published for the Workers Party of America by the Daily Worker Pub. Co. Feb 1925.
- Class Struggle vs. Class Collaboration. by Earl Browder Chicago: Published for the Workers Party of America by the Daily worker publishing company, 1925 (The little red library #2).
- Principles of Communism: Engels's Original Draft of the Communist Manifesto. translated by Max Bedacht Chicago: Published for the Workers Party of America by the Daily worker 1925. (Little Red Library #3).
- Worker Correspondents: What? When? Where? Why? How? by William F. Dunne Chicago, Ill.: Published for the Workers Party of America by the Daily Worker Pub. Co., 1925 (The Little red library #4).
- Poems for workers, an anthology ed. by Manuel Gomez Chicago: Published for Workers Party of America by Daily Worker Pub. Co., 1925 (Little Red Library #5).
- The theory and practice of Leninism by Joseph Stalin Chicago: Published for the Workers Party of America by the Daily Worker Pub. Co., 1925.
- Leninism or Trotskyism by Joseph Stalin, Lev Kamenev and Grigory Zinovyev Chicago: Published for the Workers Party of America by the Daily Worker Pub. Co., 1925.
- American Imperialism: The Menace of the Greatest Capitalist World Power. by Jay Lovestone Chicago: Literature Department, Workers Party of America, n.d. [1925].
- The fourth national convention of the Workers (Communist) Party of America: Report of the Central Executive Committee to the 4th national convention held in Chicago, Illinois, August 21st to 30th, 1925: resolutions of the Parity Commission and others. Chicago: Daily Worker Publishing Co., 1925.
- From the Third through the Fourth Convention of the Workers (Communist) Party of America by Charles E. Ruthenberg Chicago, Ill.: Published for the Workers (Communist) Party of America by the Daily Worker Pub. Co., 1925.
- The Workers (Communist) Party: What It Stands For, Why Workers Should Join by Charles E. Ruthenberg Chicago, Ill: Workers (Communist) Party 1925.
- The Party Organization. Chicago: Published for the Workers (Communist) Party by the Daily Worker Publishing Co. 1925.
- Passaic: The Story of a Struggle against Starvation Wages and for the Right to Organize. by Albert Weisbord Chicago; Published for the Workers (Communist) Party by the Daily Worker Pub. Co., November 1926.
- A souvenir: the Paris Commune (March 28th to May 28th, 1871) in historical pictures. Chicago, Ill.: Workers (Communist) Party of America, 1926.
- The General Strike and the General Betrayal. by John Pepper Chicago: Workers (Communist) Party of America, 1926.
- Proletarian song book of lyrics from the operetta The last revolution by Mike Gold, J Ramirez and Rudolph Liebich [Chicago, Ill.]: Local Chicago Workers Party of America, 1920s.
- On a labor faker's trail: the shady record of Frank Farrington T. J. O'Flaherty, Chicago, Pub. by Workers Party of America, Dist. no. 8.

== Other parties with similar names ==
- Workers Party of the United States. The name was used by the fused organisation of the Communist League of America (whose members in 1938 formed the Socialist Workers Party) and the American Workers Party of A. J. Muste in 1934 prior to its temporary merger with the Socialist Party of America in 1935.
- Workers Party. Party led by Max Shachtman after his break with the Socialist Workers Party. 1940–1949.
- Workers Party, USA. Chicago-based organization. 1992–present.
