= John Keracher =

Scottish-born American Marxist activist and author (1880–1958)

John Keracher as he appeared in the 1940s.

John Keracher (16 January 1880 – 11 January 1958) was a Scottish-born American Marxist activist and author. He helped found the Proletarian Party of America in 1920, and was its leader for several decades. He also managed the Charles H. Kerr & Co. book publishing firm after its founder retired.

== Biography ==
=== Early years ===
John Keracher was born on January 16, 1880, in Dundee, Scotland. The self-taught son of a shoemaker, he was exposed at a young age to the "impossibilist" Scottish socialist tradition associated with Daniel De Leon. While in his early twenties, Keracher left for England. After living there a number of years, he emigrated in 1909 to the United States. He settled in Detroit, where he was proprietor of the Reliance Shoe House, a retail shoe store located in downtown Detroit.

=== Political activism ===
In April 1910, Keracher joined the Michigan chapter of the Socialist Party of America (SPA). He studied the works of Karl Marx and Friedrich Engels and hosted Marxist evening classes in the back of his shoe store. He became an orthodox Marxist who specialized in expositions of Das Kapital, particularly on the topics of use-value, exchange-value, surplus-value, and historical materialism.

Keracher believed in the primacy of Marxist education of the working class to prepare them for governance upon the inevitable assumption of power through socialist revolution. This education program took shape through the formation of local "Proletarian Clubs", later united under the banner of the "Proletarian University of America", a proto-party organization headed by Keracher. His university formed study circles in towns throughout Michigan as well as in cities around the country, including Buffalo, Rochester, Minneapolis, Chicago, and Los Angeles.

In 1916, Keracher won election as secretary of state of the Michigan Socialist Party. He moved Michigan's party platform to the left, and grew dissatisfied with what he perceived as reformist tendencies within SPA's leadership. The left-dominated Michigan state convention in 1917 "passed a resolution urging members to take a firm stance against religion 'on the basis of the materialist conception of history.'" The following year, Keracher helped launch a Detroit-based monthly publication called The Proletarian. In May 1919, he and his Michigan followers—numbering approximately 6,000—were expelled from SPA. It was done ostensibly for the state party's attacks on religion "in direct opposition to the long-standing national policy of neutrality on the 'religious question'." Keracher's Michigan colleague Oakley C. Johnson was incensed, charging in The Proletarian that SPA had "expelled the only red state in the national organization".

Keracher was a delegate to the June 1919 National Conference of the Left Wing in New York City; he had been invited by the Left Wing Section of the Socialist Party. He attended with four other expelled Michigan Socialist Party leaders: Oakley Johnson, Dennis Batt, Al Renner, and A.J. MacGregor.

In September 1919, Keracher participated in the founding of the Communist Party of America at a convention in Chicago. Unlike some of his comrades who viewed the recent Bolshevik Revolution as a prelude to a similar upheaval in the U.S., Keracher did not expect an imminent Communist Revolution, as historian Theodore Draper notes:

[The Michigan group] differed with the rest of the Left Wing on a number of vital points. They took the unpopular position that American capitalism had emerged from the war stronger than ever, and that it was destined to survive for an indefinite period. They believed that the most effective means of bringing the revolutionary message to the American people were political and educational. They rated trade unions very low in the revolutionary scale. The Michigan theory of educating for the revolution had the effect of conveniently bypassing the discouraging present in favor of the great day when the vast majority would be intellectually prepared to vote the Socialist revolution into existence.

In early January 1920, Keracher was arrested during the so-called Palmer Raids being conducted nationwide. Although many in the Justice Department believed that he, as a resident alien from Scotland, was deportable since he held political views that ultimately advocated "force and violence", deportation proceedings against him were dismissed later in the year by the Department of Labor's Bureau of Immigration.

Also in January 1920, Keracher and the Michigan socialists were ousted from the newly formed Communist Party. The Michiganders refused to "go underground" and become a secret organization, as the CP leadership was advising in the wake of the Palmer Raids. After the CP split, the Michigan socialists in June 1920 formed the Proletarian Party of America (PPA); Keracher was named the Party's first leader. As the organization grew, local branches emerged in at least 38 U.S. cities.

Keracher moved from Detroit to Chicago in the mid-1920s, the city where the PPA was thereafter headquartered. His prior work with the Proletarian University had brought him into friendly contact with Charles H. Kerr of the Chicago-based Kerr publishing company. In 1924, Keracher became a member of the Charles H. Kerr & Co. board of directors. When Kerr retired in 1928, he sold his controlling shares in the company to Keracher.

Over the next few decades, Keracher led the PPA while also overseeing Charles H. Kerr & Co. As the PPA's chief spokesman and publicist, Keracher went on cross-country speaking tours. He wrote party convention bulletins, along with articles and editorials for the PPA's official organ, the Proletarian News. He authored numerous pamphlets, such as How the Gods Were Made (1929), Producers and Parasites (1935), Crime: Its Causes and Consequences (1937), and Frederick Engels (1946).

=== Death and legacy ===
In 1954, with his health beginning to fail, Keracher retired as Executive Secretary of the Proletarian Party, passing the mantle to Al Wysocki. Keracher moved to Los Angeles, where he remained active in party affairs.

Keracher died of a heart ailment on January 11, 1958. He was 77.

The PPA formally disbanded in 1971. In addition to his many writings, Keracher is also remembered for his stewardship of America's oldest Marxist book publisher. According to ex-PPA member Samuel J. Meyers, "the most important contribution of John Keracher to the labor movement" was to keep Charles H. Kerr & Co. solvent during several difficult decades.

== Works ==
- Labor Saving Devices. Chicago: Proletarian Party, n.d. [c. 1923].
- How the Gods Were Made (A Study in Historical Materialism). Chicago: Charles H. Kerr & Co., 1929.
- "The Proletarian Party and Its Work". The Proletarian (Chicago), vol. 12, no. 1, (Jan.–Feb. 1929).
- "Ten Years of Communism in America". The Proletarian (Chicago), (Sept. 1929, Nov. 1929, Feb. 1930, March–April 1930).
- Producers and Parasites. Chicago: Charles H. Kerr & Co. 1935.
- Economics for Beginners: Elementary Economics in Simple Language. Chicago: Charles H. Kerr & Co. 1935.
- Why Unemployment?. Chicago: Charles H. Kerr & Co., 1935.
- The Head-Fixing Industry. Chicago: Charles H. Kerr & Co., 1935. Revised and expanded second edition, 1955.
- Crime: Its Causes and Consequences. Chicago: Charles H. Kerr & Co., n.d. [c. 1937].
- Frederick Engels. Chicago: Charles H. Kerr & Co., 1946.
- Wages and the Working Day. Chicago: Charles H. Kerr & Co, 1946.
- "We". Chicago: Proletarian Party of America, n.d. [c. 1946]. — leaflet.
- "Death of Al Renner". Proletarian News (Chicago), vol. 18, no. 9, whole no. 198 (Sept. 1949), pp. 2, 8.
- "Thirty-Five Years of Proletarian Party". Proletarian News (Chicago), vol. 24, no. 7 (July 1955).

== See also ==
- Proletarian Party of America
