= Henry Demarest Lloyd =

American journalist (1847–1903)

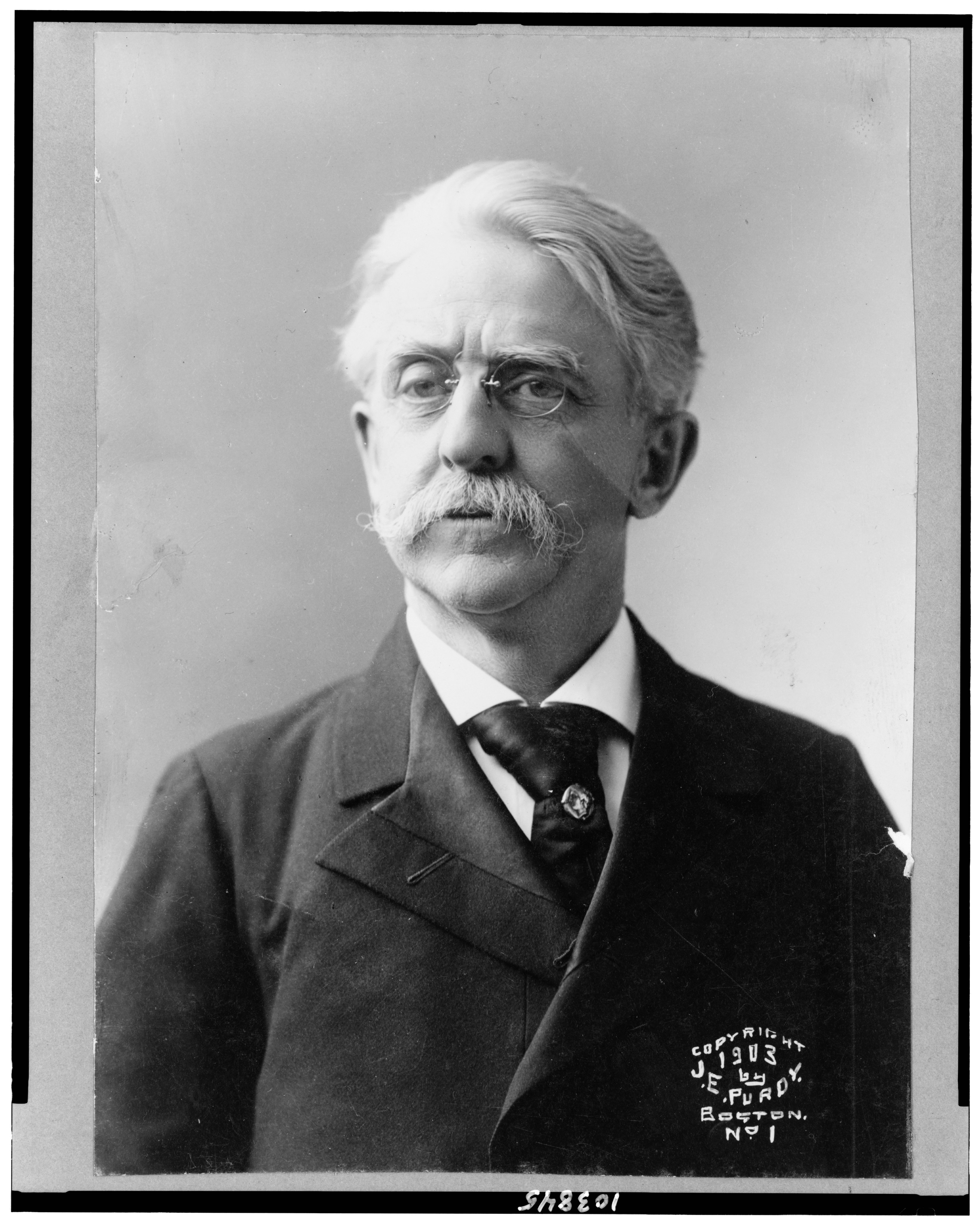
Lloyd in 1903

Henry Demarest Lloyd (May 1, 1847 – September 28, 1903) was an American journalist and political activist who was a prominent muckraker during the Progressive Era. He is best known for his exposés of Standard Oil which were written before Ida Tarbell's series for McClure's on the same topic.

== Early life ==
Henry Demarest Lloyd was born on May 1, 1847, in the home of his maternal grandfather on Sixth Avenue in New York City. Henry was the first child of Aaron Lloyd, a graduate of Rutgers College and New Brunswick Theological Seminary and minister of the Dutch Reformed Church, and Maria Christie (née Demarest) Lloyd.

One of Lloyd's strongest formative influences was the preaching of Henry Ward Beecher, whose sermons he regularly attended.

Lloyd attended Columbia College , where he was a member of the Philolexian Society, and Columbia Law School. Lloyd worked at a library and taught to pay his way through school. Upon graduation, Lloyd was admitted to the New York state bar in 1869.

== Journalistic career ==
Henry Demarest Lloyd as a young reporter in 1872.

In 1872, Lloyd joined the staff of the Chicago Tribune, gaining promotion to the position of chief editorial writer in 1875. He remained at the paper until 1885.

Lloyd was one of the precursors to the later muckraker journalists, writing a searing exposé of the monopolistic abuses of John D. Rockefeller's Standard Oil Trust, "The Story of a Great Monopoly," published in the March 1881 issue of The Atlantic. He later fleshed out his case against the unbridled corporate power of Standard Oil and similar corporations in his best-known book, Wealth Against Commonwealth, published in 1894. Lloyd's work thus preceded Ida Tarbell's more famous 1904 work, "The History of Standard Oil," by a number of years.

== Entry into politics ==
As a political activist, Lloyd defended the Haymarket anarchists in 1886, a position that caused his father-in-law, William Bross, publisher of the Tribune, to disinherit him and his wife Jessie Bross. However, William Bross and his only daughter must have made amends, because he died in her home.

Lloyd, after leaving the newspaper, continued to file stories as a free-lancing dispatcher, using the Associated Press wires, and his publications of outrage over the treatment of miners in the Spring Valley dispute are credited with ending that episode. Lloyd also wrote and spoke on behalf of Milwaukee streetcar operators in 1893, and anthracite coal miners in 1902.

Lloyd was a leading citizen of Winnetka, Illinois. Elected more than once as a Village trustee and member of the Board of Education, he served as vice-president of the Village council from 1884 to 1886, and as Village treasurer in 1887 and 1888. He was president of the Town Meeting in 1898 and is credited with a leading role in pioneering what became known nationally as the "Winnetka system" of self-government, a reform cause broadly taken up by Samuel Gompers and the labor movement.

In 1894, Lloyd ran for United States Congress as a candidate of the People's Party, the so-called "Populists." In subsequent years he was supportive of the aims of the Socialist Party of America, although he was never an active member of the organization.

== Death and legacy ==
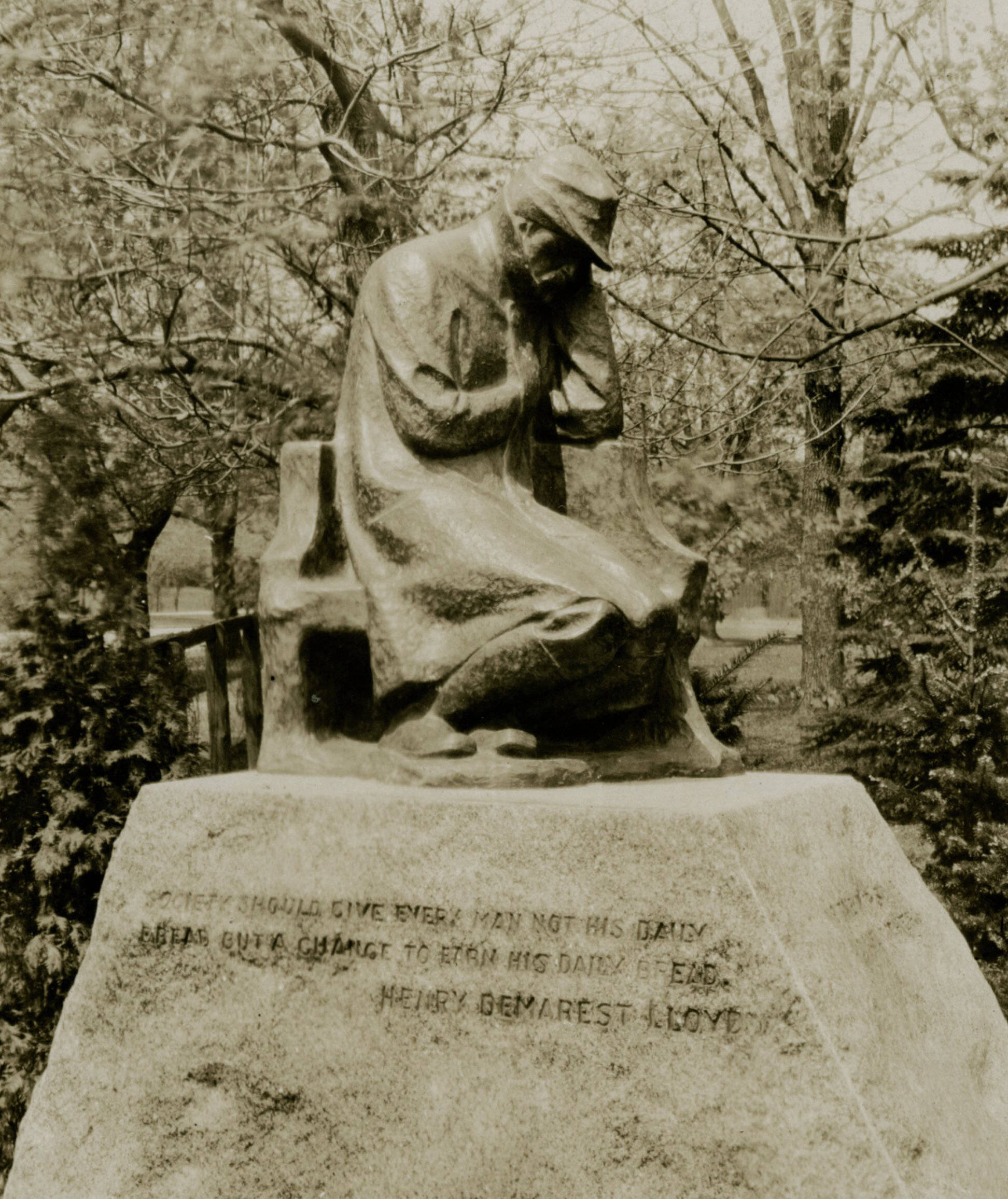
Memorial statue in Winnetka, Illinois. Inscription attributed to Lloyd reads "Society should give each man not his daily bread but a chance to earn his daily bread."

Henry Demarest Lloyd, remembered by a contemporary as the "pioneer and leader" of the trust-busting progressive movement, died on September 28, 1903. He was survived by a son, William Bross Lloyd, who would emerge as a founding member and early leader of the Communist Labor Party of America in 1919.

After his death, Lloyd's library, which included thousands of books and pamphlets relating to trade unionism, cooperation, socialism, and monopolies, was donated to the University of Wisconsin.

Lloyd was an inspiration to a generation of young investigative journalists and radical political activists, such as Charles Edward Russell, who later recalled:

"As the Standard Oil article in the Atlantic became the armory of every person willing to fight for industrial freedom, so Wealth Against Commonwealth in later years became the great storehouse of information to which numbers of able campaigners habitually resorted for their facts. Probably millions of men read or heard Mr. Lloyd's ideas without being aware of the real authorship. But I judge that with this condition he was well content. No man ever entered such a fight with a smaller share of personal vanity to gratify. He desired that his countrymen should be informed of existing conditions, but not that he himself should gain fame or rewards."

In recognition of Lloyd's work, the Center for Investigative Reporting launched the "Henry Demarest Lloyd Investigative Fund" in 2009 to provide grants to investigative journalists.

The Henry Demarest Lloyd House in Winnetka is now a National Historic Landmark.

== See also ==
- Florence Kelley, a social reformer inspired by Lloyd
- Carolyn Lloyd Strobell, Lloyd's sister and biographer

== Works ==
For a complete list of works see Lloyd (1912), pp. 351-364

- — (March 1881). "Story of a Great Monopoly". The Atlantic Monthly. XLVII (CCLXXXL): 317–334.
- — (1890). A Strike of Millionaires Against Miners or The Story of Spring Valley: An Open Letter to the Millionaires, 2nd ed. Chicago: Belford-Clarke Co. ISBN 9780384331839.
- — (1894). Wealth Against Commonwealth. New York: Harper & Brothers. Archived from the original on 2011-07-08.
- — (1898). Labor Copartnership: Notes of a Visit To Co-operator Workshops, Factories and Farms in Great Britain and Ireland. New York: Harper & Brothers.
- — (1900). Lords of Industry. New York: Doubleday, Page & Co.
- — (1903). Newest England: Notes of a Democratic Traveller in New Zealand. New York: Doubleday, Page & Co.
- — (1906). Man, the Social Creator. New York: Doubleday, Page & Co.
- — (1909). Men, the Workers. New York: Doubleday, Page & Co.
- — (1910). A Country Without Strikes: A Visit to the Compulsory Arbitration Court of New Zealand. New York: Putnam's Sons.
- — (1910). Mazzini and Other Essays. New York: Putnam's Sons.

Trade union offices
Preceded by Martin Fox; George E. McNeill	American Federation of Labor delegate to the Trades Union Congress; 1898; With: James Duncan	Succeeded by James O'Connell; Thomas F. Tracy
