= Ida Tarbell =

American writer, journalist, biographer and lecturer (1857–1944)

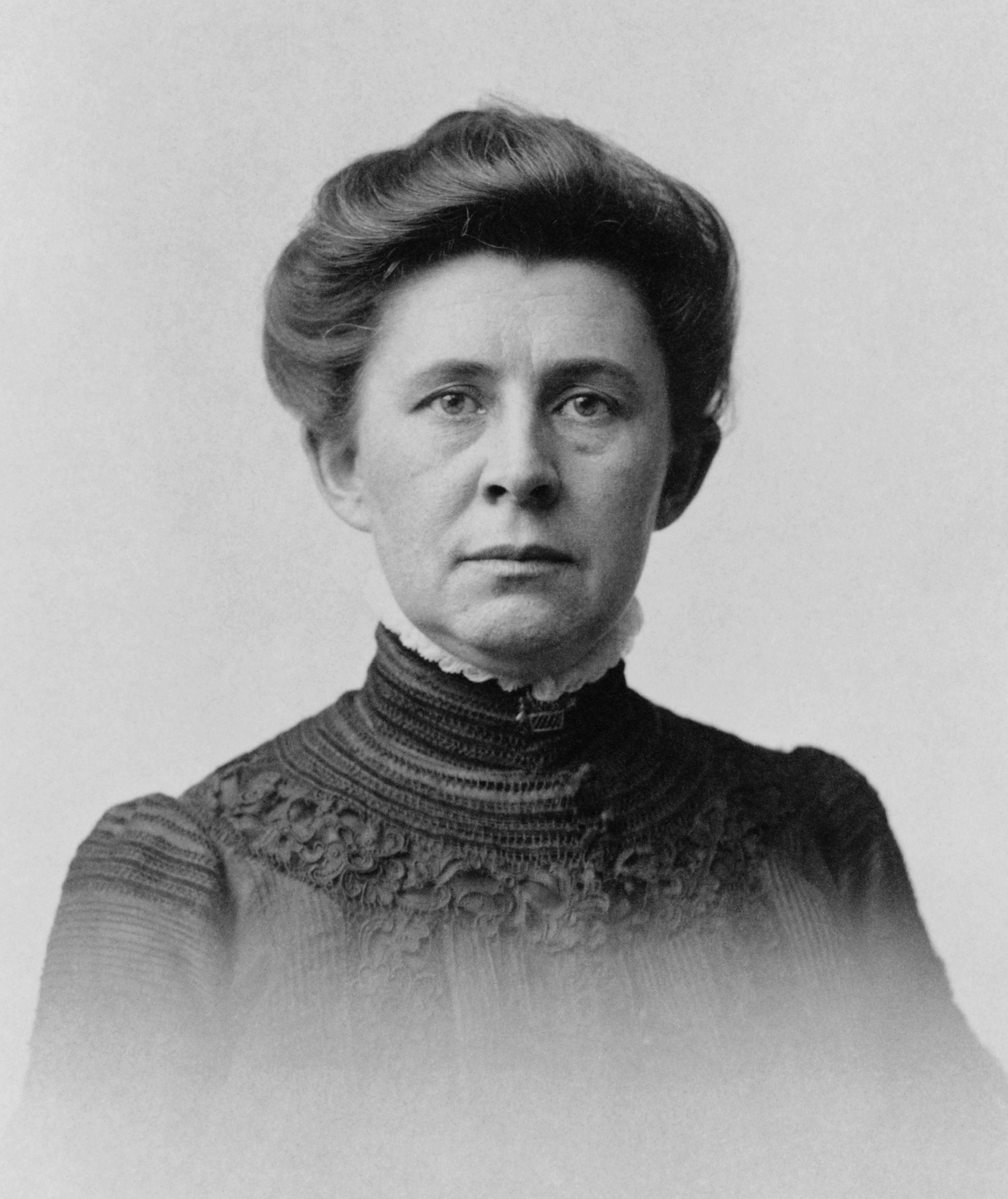
- Portrait in 1904
- Born: Ida Minerva Tarbell; November 5, 1857; Hatch Hollow, Amity Township, Erie County, Pennsylvania, U.S.
- Died: January 6, 1944 (aged 86); Bridgeport, Connecticut, U.S.
- Occupations: Teacher; writer; journalist
- Writing career
- Notable work: The History of the Standard Oil Company

Ida Minerva Tarbell (November 5, 1857 – January 6, 1944) was an American writer, investigative journalist, biographer, and lecturer. She was one of the leading muckrakers and reformers of the Progressive Era of the late 19th and early 20th centuries and was a pioneer of investigative journalism.

Born in Pennsylvania at the beginning of the oil boom, Tarbell is best known for her 1904 book The History of the Standard Oil Company. The book was first published as a series of articles in McClure's from 1902 to 1904. It has been called a "masterpiece of investigative journalism", by historian J. North Conway, as well as "the single most influential book on business ever published in the United States" by historian Daniel Yergin. The work contributed to the dissolution of the Standard Oil monopoly and helped usher in the Hepburn Act of 1906, the Mann-Elkins Act, the creation of the Federal Trade Commission (FTC), and the passage of the Clayton Antitrust Act of 1914.

Tarbell also wrote several biographies over the course of her 64-year career. She wrote biographies on Madame Roland and Napoleon. Tarbell believed that "the Truth and motivations of powerful human beings could be discovered." That Truth, she became convinced, could be conveyed in such a way as "to precipitate meaningful social change." She wrote numerous books and works on Abraham Lincoln, including ones that focused on his early life and career. After her exposé on Standard Oil and character study of John D. Rockefeller, she wrote biographies of businessmen Elbert Henry Gary, chairman of U.S. Steel, and Owen D. Young, president of General Electric.

A prolific writer and lecturer, Tarbell was known for taking complex subjects — such as the oil industry, tariffs, labor practices — and breaking them down into informative and easily understood articles. Her articles drove circulation at McClure's Magazine and The American Magazine and many of her books were popular with the general American public. After a successful career as both writer and editor for McClure's Magazine, Tarbell left with several other editors to buy and publish The American Magazine. Tarbell also traveled to all of the then 48 states on the lecture circuit and spoke on subjects including the evils of war, world peace, American politics, trusts, tariffs, labor practices, and women's issues.

Tarbell took part in professional organizations and served on two Presidential committees. She helped form the Authors League (now the Authors Guild) and was President of the Pen and Brush Club for 30 years. During World War I, she served on President Woodrow Wilson's Women's Committee on the Council of National Defense. After the war, Tarbell served on President Warren G. Harding's 1921 Unemployment Conference.

Tarbell, who never married, is often considered a feminist by her actions, although she was critical of the women's suffrage movement.

== Early life and education ==
Tarbell was born on a farm in Erie County, Pennsylvania, on November 5, 1857, to Esther Ann (née McCullough), a teacher, and Franklin Summer Tarbell, a teacher and a joiner and later an oilman. She was born in the log cabin home of her maternal grandfather, Walter Raleigh McCullough, a Scots-Irish pioneer, and his wife. Her father's distant immigrant ancestors had settled in New England in the 17th century. Tarbell was told by her grandmother that they were descended from Sir Walter Raleigh, a member of George Washington's staff, and also the first American Episcopalian bishop. Tarbell had three younger siblings: Walter, Franklin, Jr., and Sarah. Franklin, Jr. died of scarlet fever at a young age and Sarah, also afflicted, would remain physically weakened throughout her life. Walter became an oilman like his father, while Sarah was an artist.

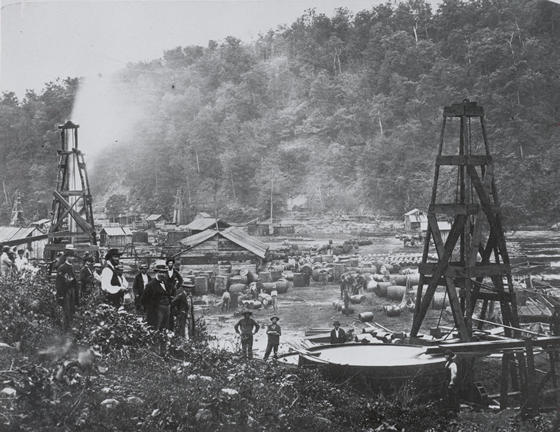
A Pennsylvania oil field in 1862

Ida Tarbell's early life in the oil fields of Pennsylvania would have an impact when she later wrote on the Standard Oil Company and on labor practices. The Panic of 1857 hit the Tarbell family hard as banks collapsed and the Tarbells lost their savings. Franklin Tarbell was away in Iowa building a family homestead when Ida was born. Franklin had to abandon the Iowan house and return to Pennsylvania. With no money, he walked across the states of Illinois, Indiana, and Ohio to return, and supported himself along the way by teaching in rural schools. When he returned, ragged from his 18-month journey, young Ida Tarbell was said to have told him, "Go away, bad man!"

The Tarbells' fortune would turn as the Pennsylvania oil rush began in 1859. They lived in the western region of Pennsylvania as new oil fields were being developed, utterly changing the regional economy. Oil, she would write in her autobiography, opened “a rich field for tricksters, swindlers, exploiters of vice in every known form.” Tarbell's father first used his trade to build wooden oil storage tanks. The family lived in a shack with a workshop for Franklin in an oil field with twenty-five oil wells. Oil was everywhere in the sand, pits, and puddles. Tarbell wrote of the experience, "No industry of man in its early days has ever been more destructive of beauty, order, decency, than the production of petroleum."

In 1860, Ida's father moved the family to Rouseville, Pennsylvania. Accidents that occurred in Rouseville impacted Ida Tarbell deeply. Town founder and neighbor Henry Rouse was drilling for oil when a flame hit natural gas coming from a pump. Rouse survived a few hours, which gave him just enough time to write his will and leave his million-dollar estate to the other settlers to build roads. In total, 18 men were killed, and the Tarbells' mother, Esther, cared for one of the burn victims in their home. In another incident, three women died in a kitchen explosion. Tarbell was not allowed to see the bodies, but she sneaked into the room where the women awaited burial. Tarbell suffered from nightmares for the rest of her life.

After the Rouseville boom was finished in 1869, the family moved to Titusville, Pennsylvania. Tarbell's father built a family house at 324 Main Street using lumber and fixtures from the defunct Bonta Hotel in Pithole, Pennsylvania.

Tarbell's father later became an oil producer and refiner in Venango County. Franklin's business, along with those of many other small businessmen, was adversely affected by the South Improvement Company scheme (circa 1872) between the railroads and more substantial oil interests where in less than four months during what was later known as "The Cleveland Conquest" or "The Cleveland Massacre," Standard Oil absorbed 22 of its 26 Cleveland competitors. Later, Tarbell would vividly recall this event in her writing, in which she accused the leaders of the Standard Oil Company of using unfair tactics to put her father and many small oil companies out of business. The South Improvement Company secretly worked with the railroads to raise the rates on oil shipment for independent oil men. The members of South Improvement Company received discounts and rebates to offset the rates and put the independents out of business. Franklin Tarbell participated against the South Improvement Company through marches and tipping over Standard Oil railroad tankers. The government of Pennsylvania eventually moved to disband the South Improvement Company.

The Tarbells were socially active, entertaining prohibitionists and women's suffragists. Her family subscribed to Harper's Weekly, Harper's Monthly, and the New York Tribune and it was there that Ida Tarbell followed the events of the Civil War. Tarbell would also sneak into the family worker's bunkhouse to read copies of the Police Gazette—a gruesome tabloid. Her family was Methodist and attended church twice a week. Esther Tarbell supported women's rights and entertained women such as Mary Livermore and Frances E. Willard.

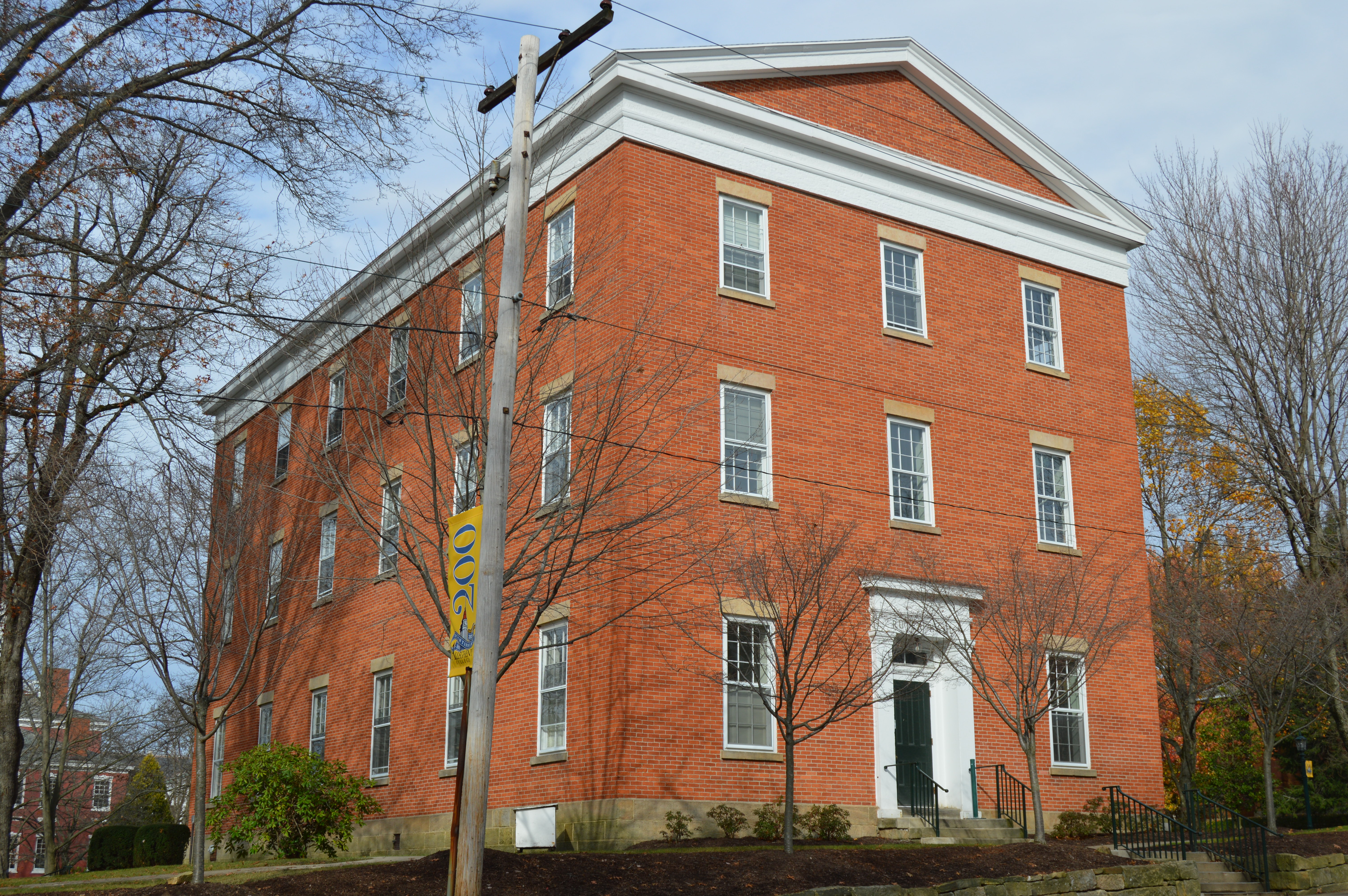
Ruter Hall, Allegheny College

Ida Tarbell was intelligent—but also undisciplined in the classroom. According to reports by Tarbell herself, she paid little attention in class and was often truant until one teacher set her straight: "She told me the plain and ugly truth about myself that day, and as I sat there, looking her straight in the face, too proud to show any feeling, but shamed as I never had been before and never have been since." Tarbell was especially interested in the sciences, and she began comparing the landscape around her in Pennsylvania to what she was learning in school. "Here I was suddenly on a ground which meant something to me. From childhood, plants, insects, stones were what I saw when I went abroad, what I brought home to press, to put into bottles, to litter up the house... I had never realized that they were subjects for study... School suddenly became exciting."

Tarbell graduated at the head of her high school class in Titusville and went on to study biology at Allegheny College in 1876, where she was the only woman in her class of 41. Tarbell had an interest in evolutionary biology—at her childhood home she spent many hours with a microscope—and said of her interest in science, "The quest for the truth had been born in me... the most essential of man's quests." One of Tarbell's professors, Jeremiah Tingley, allowed her to use the college's microscope for study and Tarbell used it to study the Common Mudpuppy, a foot-long amphibian that used both gills and a lung and thought to be a missing link.

Tarbell displayed leadership at Allegheny. She was a founding member of the local sorority that became the Mu chapter of the Kappa Alpha Theta sorority in 1876. Tarbell also led the charge to place a sophomore stone on campus dedicated to learning and with the Latin phrase, Spes sibi quisque, which translates to "Everyone is his/her own hope". She was a member of the campus women's literary society, the Ossoli Society, named after writer Margaret Fuller Ossoli, and wrote for the society's publication, the Mosaic.

Tarbell graduated in 1880 with an A.B. degree and an M.A. degree in 1883. Tarbell later supported the university by serving on the board of trustees, to which she was first elected in 1912. She was the second woman to serve as a trustee and held the post for more than three decades.

== Early career ==
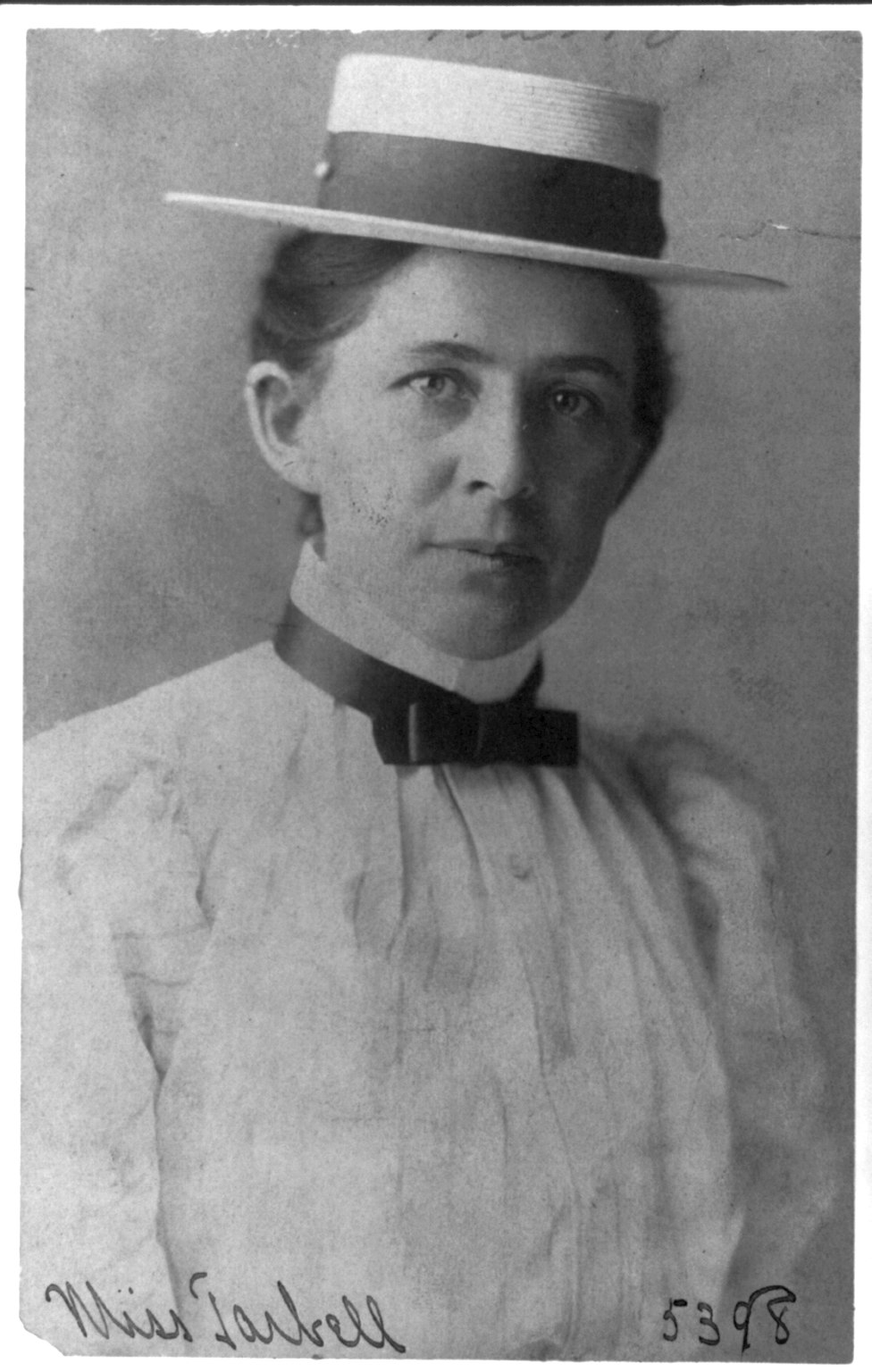
Ida Minerva Tarbell, 1890

Tarbell left school seeking to contribute to society but unsure of how to do so, she became a teacher. Tarbell began her career as headmistress at Poland Union Seminary in Poland, Ohio in August 1880. The school was both a high school and provided continuing education courses for local teachers. Tarbell taught classes in geology, botany, geometry, and trigonometry as well as languages: Greek, Latin, French, and German. After two years, she realized teaching was too much for her, and she returned home. She was exhausted by the workload and exasperated by the low wages which meant she had to borrow money from her parents.

Tarbell returned to Pennsylvania, where she met Theodore L. Flood, editor of The Chautauquan, a teaching supplement for home study courses at Chautauqua, New York. Tarbell's family was familiar with the movement which encouraged adult education and self-study. She was quick to accept Flood's offer to write for the publication. Initially, Tarbell worked two weeks at the Meadville, Pennsylvania headquarters and worked two weeks at home. This allowed her to continue her own study at home in biology using microscopes. She became managing editor in 1886, and her duties included proofreading, answering reader questions, providing proper pronunciation of certain words, translating foreign phrases, identifying characters, and defining words.

Tarbell began writing brief items for the magazine before working up to longer features as she established her writing style and voice. Her first article was 'The Arts and Industries of Cincinnati' and appeared in December 1886. According to Steve Weinberg in Taking on the Trust, this was when Tarbell established a style that would carry throughout her career: "Tarbell would imbue her articles, essays, and books with moral content, grounded in her unwavering rectitude. That rectitude, while sometimes suggesting inflexibility, drove her instincts for reform, a vital element in her future confrontation with Rockefeller."

Tarbell wrote two articles that showcased her conflicting views on the roles of women that would follow her through her life. Tarbell's article, "Women as Inventors," was published in the March 1887 issue of The Chautauquan. When an article written by Mary Lowe Dickinson claimed the number of women patent owners to be about 300—and that women would never become successful inventors—Tarbell's curiosity was sparked and she began her own investigation. Tarbell traveled to the Patent Office in Washington, D.C., and met with the head of the department, R. C. McGill. McGill had put together a list of close to 2,000 women. Tarbell wrote in the article, "Three things worth knowing and believing: that women have invented a large number of useful articles; that these patents are not confined to 'clothes and kitchen' devices as the skeptical masculine mind avers; that invention is a field in which woman has large possibilities." Tarbell later followed this article up with a showcase on women in journalism in April 1887. The article contained history, journalism practices, and advice including a warning that journalism was an open field for women, and yet women should refrain from shedding tears easily and appearing weak.

Tarbell balked at being a "hired gal" and decided to strike out on her own after a falling out with Theodore Flood. Tarbell decided to follow her father's philosophy that it was better to work for oneself than to be a hired hand. She began researching women from history including Germaine de Staël and Madame Roland for inspiration and as subject matter for her writing. The real reason for the fall-out with Flood remains a mystery, but one reason may have been the placement of his son's name on the Masthead above Tarbell's own. Another hinted that her family had reason to seek revenge on him.

== Paris in the 1890s ==
Leaving the security of The Chautauquan, Tarbell moved to Paris in 1891 at age 34 to live and work. She shared an apartment on the Rue du Sommerard with three women friends from The Chautauquan. The apartment was within a few blocks of the Panthéon, Notre-Dame de Paris, and the Sorbonne. This was an exciting time in Paris. The Eiffel Tower had been finished recently in 1889, and Tarbell and her friends enjoyed the art produced by Impressionists including Degas, Monet, Manet, and Van Gogh. Tarbell described the color of the art as "the blues and greens fairly howl they are so bright and intense." Tarbell attended the Can-can at the Moulin Rouge and in a letter to her family she advised them to read Mark Twain's description of it in The Innocents Abroad as she didn't like to write about it.

Tarbell had an active social life in Paris. She and her flatmates hosted a language salon where both English and French speakers could come together and practice their non-native language skills. Her landlady, Madame Bonnet, held weekly dinners for the women and her other tenants. These tenants included young men from Egypt, and among them was Prince Said Toussoum, a cousin of the Egyptian ruler. Tarbell met and had a possible romance with Charles Downer Hazen, a future French historian and professor at Smith College.

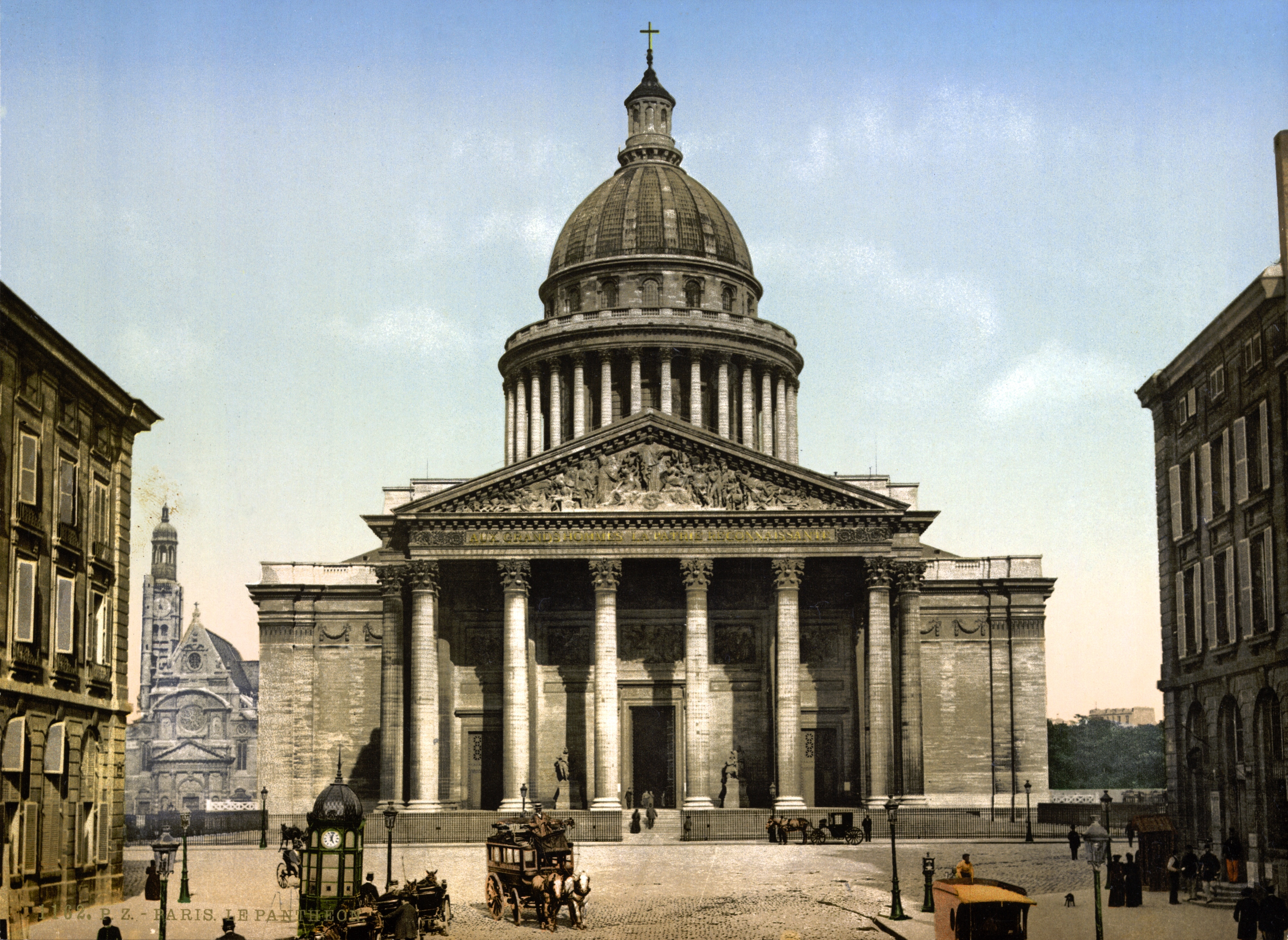
The Pantheon in Paris, ca. 1890-1900

Tarbell set about making her career as a writer in Paris. She supported herself by writing for several American newspapers including the Pittsburgh Dispatch, the Cincinnati Times-Star, and the Chicago Tribune. Tarbell published the short story, France Adorée, in the December 1891 issue of Scribner's Magazine. All of this work, along with a tutorship, helped Tarbell as she worked on her first biography, a book on Madame Roland: the leader of an influential salon during the French Revolution. Tarbell already wanted to rescue women from the obscurity of history. Her research led her to an introduction to Leon Marillier, a descendant of Roland who provided access to Roland's letters and family papers. Marillier invited Tarbell to visit the Roland Country estate, Le Clos.

Tarbell continued her education in Paris and also learned investigative and research techniques used by French historians. Tarbell attended lectures at the Sorbonne—including those on the history of the French Revolution, 18th-century literature, and period painting. She learned from French historians how to present evidence in a clear, compelling style.

What Tarbell discovered about Madame Roland changed her own worldview. She began the biography with admiration for Roland but grew disillusioned as she researched and learned more. Tarbell determined that Roland, who followed her husband's lead, was not the independent thinker she had imagined and was complicit in creating an atmosphere where violence led to the Terror and her own execution. She wrote of Roland, "This woman had been one of the steadiest influences to violence, willing, even eager, to use this terrible revolutionary force, so bewildering and terrifying to me, to accomplish her ends, childishly believing herself and her friends strong enough to control it when they needed it no longer. The heaviest blow to my self-confidence so far was my loss of faith in revolution as a divine weapon. Not since I discovered the world not to have been made in six days...had I been so intellectually and spiritually upset."

It was during this time that Tarbell received bad news and then a shock. Franklin Tarbell's business partner had committed suicide, leaving Franklin in debt. Subsequently, a July 1892 newspaper announced that Tarbell's hometown of Titusville had been completely destroyed by flood and fire. Over 150 people died, and she feared her family was among them. Oil Creek had flooded and inflammable material on the water had ignited and exploded. Tarbell was relieved when she received a one-word cablegram that read: "Safe!" Her family and their home had been spared.

== McClure's Magazine ==
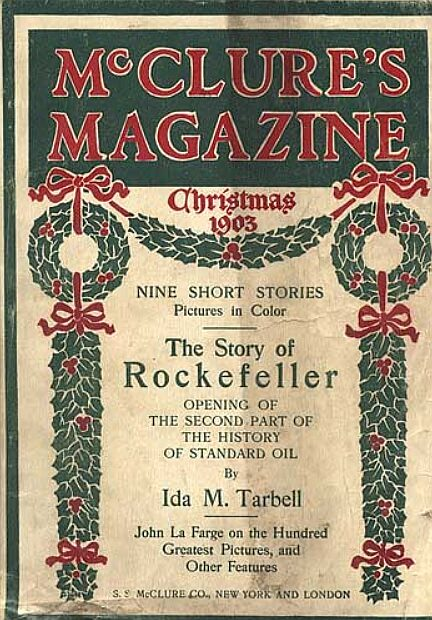
McClure's Christmas 1903 cover

Tarbell had published articles with the syndicate run by publisher Samuel McClure, and McClure had read a Tarbell article called The Paving of the Streets of Paris by Monsieur Alphand, which described how the French carried out large public works. Impressed, McClure told his partner John S. Philips, "This girl can write. We need to get her to do some work for our magazine". The magazine he was referring to was McClure's Magazine, a new venture that he and Philips were intending to launch to appeal to the average middle-class reader. Convinced that Tarbell was just the kind of writer that he wanted to work for him, he showed up at Tarbell's door in Paris while on a scheduled visit to France in 1892 to offer her the editor position at the new magazine.

Tarbell described McClure as a "will-of-the-wisp". He overstayed his visit, missed his train, and had to borrow $40 from Tarbell to travel on to Geneva. Tarbell assumed she would never see the money again which was for her vacation, but his offices wired over the money the next day. Tarbell initially turned him down so she could continue working on the Roland biography but McClure was determined. Next, the art director for McClure's, August Jaccaci, made a visit to Tarbell to show her the maiden issue of the magazine.

Instead of taking up the editor position at McClure's, Tarbell began writing freelance articles for the magazine. She wrote articles about women intellectuals and writers in Paris as well as scientists. She hoped articles such as "A Paris Press Woman" for the Boston Transcript in 1893 would provide a blueprint for women journalists and writers. She interviewed Louis Pasteur for an 1893 article, visiting with Pasteur and going through his family photographs for the magazine. She returned to Pasteur again to find out his views on the future. This piece turned into a regular report on "The Edge of the Future." Others interviewed for the report included Émile Zola, Alphonse Daudet, and Alexandre Dumas fils. Tarbell took on the role of the magazine's Paris representative. Tarbell was then offered the position of youth editor to replace Frances Hodgson Burnett. When her biography of Madame Roland was finished, Tarbell returned home and joined the staff of McClure's for a salary of $3,000 a year.

=== Napoleon Bonaparte ===
Tarbell returned from Paris in the summer of 1894, and, after a visit with family in Titusville, moved to New York City. In June of that year, Samuel McClure contacted her in order to commission a biographical series on French leader Napoleon Bonaparte. McClure had heard that the Century Magazine, McClure's rival, was working on a series of articles about Bonaparte. Tarbell stayed at Twin Oaks in Washington, D.C., the home of Gardiner Green Hubbard, while working on the series. Tarbell made use of Hubbard's extensive collection of Napoleon material and memorabilia as well as resources at the Library of Congress and the U.S. State Department. Tarbell's schedule for the book was tight—the first installment came out only six weeks after she initially started her work. Tarbell called this "biography on a gallop."

The series proved to be a training ground for Tarbell's style and methodology for biographies. Tarbell believed in the Great man theory of biography and that extraordinary individuals could shape their society at least as much as society shaped them. While working on the series, Tarbell was introduced to historian and educator Herbert B. Adams of Johns Hopkins University. Adams believed in the "objective interpretation of primary sources" which would also become Tarbell's method for writing about her subjects. Adams also taught at Smith College and was a proponent for women's education.

This series of articles would solidify Tarbell's reputation as a writer, opening up new avenues for her. The Napoleon series proved popular and doubled circulation up to over 100,000 on McClure's magazine—quadrupling the readership by the final seventh Napoleon installment. It included illustrations from the Gardiner Green Hubbard collection. The articles were folded into a book that would be a best seller and earn Tarbell royalties for the rest of her life—over 70,000 copies were made of the first edition. Tarbell said that her sketch of Napoleon turned her plans "topsy-turvy." Because of its popularity, Tarbell was also finally able to find a publisher—Scribner's—for her Madame Roland book.

=== Abraham Lincoln ===
Another McClure's story meant to compete against Century Magazine was on US president Abraham Lincoln, on whom Century had published a series by his private secretaries, John Nicolay and John Hay. At first, Tarbell was reluctant to take up work on Lincoln as she later said, "If you once get into American history, I told myself, you know well enough that will finish France." At the same time, however, Tarbell had been fascinated with Lincoln since she was a young girl. She remembered the news of his assassination and her parents' reaction to it: her father coming home from his shop, her mother burying her "face in her apron, running into her room sobbing as if her heart would break."

When Tarbell first approached John Nicolay, he told her that he and Hay had written "all that was worth telling of Lincoln". Tarbell decided to begin with Lincoln's origins and his humble beginnings. Tarbell traveled the country meeting with and interviewing people who had known Lincoln—including his son Robert Todd Lincoln. Robert Lincoln shared with Tarbell an early and previously unpublished daguerreotype of Lincoln as a younger man. She followed up on a lost 1856 speech by Lincoln by tracking down Henry Clay Whitney—who claimed to have written down notes—and then confirming his notes via other witnesses. Whitney's version of the speech was published in McClure's, but has since been disproved by other historians.

Tarbell's research in the backwoods of Kentucky and Illinois uncovered the true story of Lincoln's childhood and youth. She wrote to and interviewed hundreds of people who knew or had contact with Lincoln. She tracked down leads and then confirmed their sources. She sent hundreds of letters looking for images of Lincoln and found evidence of more than three hundred previously unpublished Lincoln letters and speeches. Tarbell met with John H. Finley while visiting Knox College where Lincoln famously debated Stephen Douglas in 1858. Finley was the young college President, and he would go on to contribute to Tarbell's work on Standard Oil and rise to become the editor of The New York Times. Tarbell traveled abroad to Europe, discovering that a rumor that Lincoln had appealed to Queen Victoria to not recognize the Confederacy was, in fact, false.

By December 1895, the popular series by Tarbell once again helped boost McClure's circulation to over 250,000 which climbed to over 300,000, by 1900, making it higher than its rivals. This occurred even as the editors at Century's Magazine sneered, "They got a girl to write the Life of Lincoln." McClure would go on to use the money generated by Tarbell's articles to buy a printing plant and a bindery.

It was at this time that Tarbell decided to be a writer and not an editor. The articles were collected in a book, giving Tarbell a national reputation as a major writer and the leading authority on the slain president. Tarbell published five books about Lincoln and traveled on the lecture circuit, recounting her discoveries to large audiences.

The tight writing schedules and frequent travel eventually impacted Tarbell's health. On the verge of physical collapse, she checked into the Clifton Springs Sanitarium near Rochester, New York in 1896. Besides rest and relaxation, her treatment included taking the water cure. She would visit the Sanitarium numerous times over the next thirty years.

=== Editorship ===
Tarbell continued to write profiles for McClure in the late 1890s. While there, she had the opportunity to observe the United States expansion into imperialism through the Spanish–American War. She was writing a series on military affairs, and in 1898 she was set to interview Nelson A. Miles, the commanding general of the United States, when the battleship the USS Maine was blown up in Havana Harbor. Tarbell was allowed to keep her appointment nonetheless and observe the response at the U.S. Army Headquarters. Theodore Roosevelt was already organizing what would become the Rough Riders, and Tarbell said that he kept bursting into the Army office, "like a boy on roller skates." Tarbell longed for her old life in Paris, but realized she was needed in America: "Between Lincoln and the Spanish–American War [as it became known] I realized I was taking on a citizenship I had practically resigned".

Tarbell moved to New York and accepted a position as desk editor for McClure's in 1899. She was paid $5,000 a year and given shares in the company, which made her a part-owner. She rented an apartment in Greenwich Village which reminded her of France. She frequented the Hotel Brevoort, where Samuel Clemens (Mark Twain) also dined.

Her position as editor was to fill in for Samuel McClure, as he was planning to be away from the office for several months. Tarbell was to become known as an anchor in the office while the magazine built out its roster of investigative editors and authors. She and Phillips were described as the "control" to S. S. McClure's "motor." McClure's sent Stephen Crane to cover Cuba during the War. Ray Stannard Baker was hired by the magazine to report on the Pullman Strike. Fiction editor Violo Roseboro discovered writers such as O. Henry, Jack London, and Willa Cather. John Huston Finley quit his job as president of Knox College and became an editor for McClure's.

== Standard Oil ==
By the turn of the twentieth century McClure's began an effort to "expose the ills of American society." Having recently published a series on crime in America and looking for another big topic to cover, Tarbell and the other editors at McClure's decided to look into the growth of trusts: steel and sugar were both considered before they settled on oil. There were a number of reasons why the magazine decided to publish a story on Standard Oil: in particular, Tarbell's own first-hand experience with life in the Pennsylvania oil fields and the fact that Standard Oil was a trust represented by only one person, Rockefeller, and therefore might make the story easier to follow. Tarbell traveled to Europe and met with S. S. McClure to get his buy-in for the idea. McClure had been resting from exhaustion, but Tarbell's article idea spurred him into action. They discussed the idea over many days at a spa in Milan. McClure felt that Tarbell should use the same biographical sketch format she used for Napoleon.

On her return to the states, Tarbell handed over the desk editor role to Lincoln Steffens in 1901, and began a meticulous investigation with the help of an assistant (John Siddall) into how the industry began, Rockefeller's early interest in oil, and the Standard Oil trust. Tarbell's father expressed concern to her about writing about Standard Oil, warning her that Rockefeller would stop at nothing and would ruin the magazine. One of Rockefeller's banks did indeed threaten the magazine's financial status to which Tarbell shocked the bank executive by replying, "Of course that makes no difference to me". Tarbell developed investigative reporting techniques, delving into private archives and public documents across the country. The documentation and oral interviews she gathered proved Standard Oil had used strong-arm tactics and manipulated competitors, railroad companies and others to reach its corporate goals. Organized by Tarbell into a cogent history, they became a "damning portrayal of big business" and a personal "account of petty persecution" by Rockfeller. A subhead on the cover of Weinberg's book encapsulates it this way: "How a female investigative journalist brought down the world's greatest tycoon and broke up the Standard Oil monopoly".

Tarbell was able to find one critical piece of information that had gone missing—a book called the Rise and Fall of the South Improvement Company which had been published in 1873. Standard Oil and Rockefeller had its roots in the South Improvement Company's illegal schemes. Standard Oil had attempted to destroy all available copies of the book, but Tarbell was finally able to locate one copy in the New York Public Library.

Another break in the story came from within Standard Oil itself and proved that the company was still using illegal and shady practices. An office boy working at the Standard Oil headquarters was given the job of destroying records which included evidence that railroads were giving the company advance information about refiner's shipments. This allowed them to undercut the refiners. The young man happened to notice his Sunday school teacher's name on several documents. The teacher was a refiner, and the young man took the papers to his teacher who passed them along to Tarbell in 1904. The series and book on Standard Oil brought Tarbell fame. The book was adapted into a play in 1905 called The Lion and the Mouse. The play was a hit even though Ida had turned down the lead role and an offer of $2,500 in salary per week for the twenty-week run. Samuel Clemens (author Mark Twain) introduced Tarbell to Henry H. Rogers, vice-president at Standard Oil and considered to be the third man after John D. Rockefeller and his brother William Rockefeller. Rogers had begun his career during the American Civil War in western Pennsylvania oil regions where Tarbell had grown up. Rockefeller had bought out Rogers and his partner, but then Rogers joined the trust. In early 1902 she conducted numerous detailed interviews with Rogers at Standard Oil's headquarters. Rogers, wily and normally guarded in matters related to business and finance, may have been under the impression her work was to be complimentary and was apparently unusually forthcoming. Even after the first articles began to appear in McClure's, Rogers continued to speak with Tarbell, much to her surprise. Her investigative journalism on Standard Oil was serialized in nineteen articles that ran from November 1902 to 1904 in McClure's; her first article being published with pieces by Lincoln Steffens and Ray Stannard Baker. Together these ushered in the era of muckraking journalism.

Tarbell's biggest obstacle, however, was neither her gender nor Rockefeller's opposition. Rather, her biggest obstacle was the craft of journalism as practiced at the turn of the twentieth century. She investigated Standard Oil and Rockefeller by using documents— hundreds of thousands of pages scattered throughout the nation—and then amplified her findings through interviews with the corporation's executives and competitors, government regulators, and academic experts past and present. In other words, she proposed to practice what today is considered investigative reporting, which did not exist in 1900. Indeed, she invented a new form of journalism.

Magazine historian Frank Luther Mott called it, "one of the greatest serials ever to appear in an American magazine." It would contribute to the dissolution of Standard Oil as a monopoly and lead to the Clayton Antitrust Act. Tarbell concluded the series with a two-part character study of Rockefeller, perhaps the first CEO profile ever, though she never met or even talked to him. Rockefeller called Tarbell, "Miss Tarbarrel".

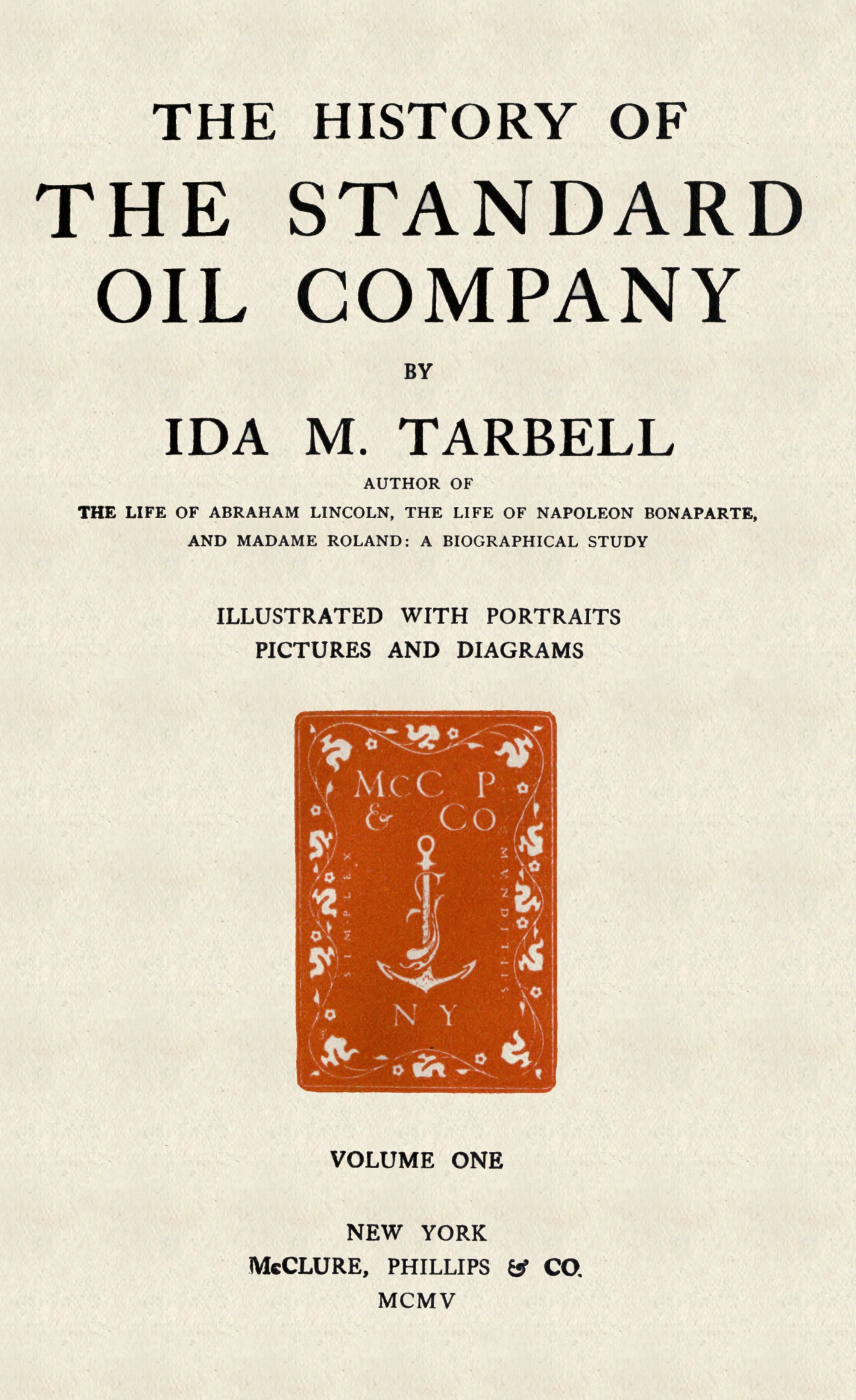
Tarbell's History of the Standard Oil Company (1904) became a bestseller

The first book-length investigation of Standard Oil had appeared in 1894 by newspaperman Henry Demarest Lloyd. However, this book, Wealth Against Commonwealth, contained factual errors and appeared to be too accusatory in nature to garner popular acclaim. However Tarbell's articles when collected in the book, The History of the Standard Oil Company (1904). became a bestseller, which was called a "masterpiece of investigative journalism" by author and historian J. North Conway. Her articles and the book would lead to the passage of the Hepburn Act in 1906 to oversee the railroads, the 1910 Mann-Elkins Act which gave the Interstate Commerce Commission power over oil rates, and the creation of the Federal Trade Commission (FTC) in 1914.

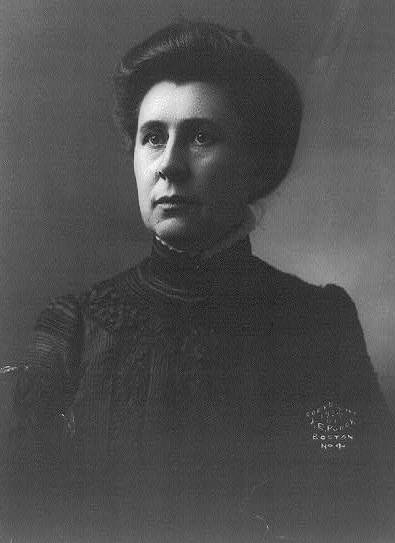
Tarbell in 1904

President Theodore Roosevelt gave Tarbell and her peers including Lincoln Steffens and Ray Stannard Baker the label, "muckrakers." Tarbell's exposé of Standard Oil first appeared in the January 1903 issue of McClure's along with Steffens' investigation of political corruption in Minneapolis and Baker's exposé on labor union practices. The term muckraker came from John Bunyan's Pilgrim's Progress describing a Man with a Muckrake forever clearing muck from the floor. Roosevelt said of the muckrakers, "The man who never does anything else, who never thinks or speaks or writes save of his feats with the muckrake, speedily becomes, not a help to society, not an incitement to good, but one of the most potent forces of evil". Tarbell disliked the muckraker label and wrote an article, "Muckraker or Historian," in which she justified her efforts for exposing the oil trust. She referred to "this classification of muckraker, which I did not like. All the radical element, and I numbered many friends among them, were begging me to join their movements. I soon found that most of them wanted attacks. They had little interest in balanced findings. Now I was convinced that in the long run the public they were trying to stir would weary of vituperation, that if you were to secure permanent results the mind must be convinced."

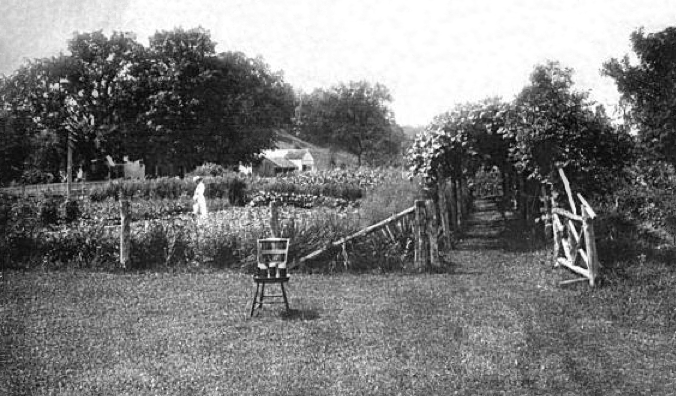
Ida Tarbell House garden

== The American Magazine ==
Tarbell had written for McClure's from 1894 until 1906. By then, S. S. McClure had become an increasingly absentee publisher, occasionally dropping in to override ideas and Tarbell's orders. She had lost her father the previous year to gastric cancer and S. S. McClure's erratic behavior at the magazine contributed to her stress, as it threatened the stability of the magazine and Tarbell's holdings. This led Tarbell and John Phillips to both resign from McClure's in June 1906, followed by Baker, Steffens, and Siddall. Tarbell and Philips raised money to form the Phillips Publishing Company and to purchase The American Illustrated Magazine, (formerly Leslie's Monthly Magazine), which they renamed The American Magazine. Phillips became president. Tarbell became its associate editor and remained there until 1915. Instead of focusing on muckraking journalism, the magazine steered away from reporting what was "wrong" in society and focused on what was "right." As well as establishing the new magazine in 1906, Tarbell moved to Connecticut and purchased a 40-acre farm in Redding Ridge, Connecticut which she named Twin Oaks. After Tarbell bought her farm in 1906, her household expanded to include a number of family members. Tarbell resided with her sister Sarah in Easton, Connecticut, at Rock House and Valley Roads. Over the years, several other family members also lived on the property, including her niece and nephew, Clara and Tristram Tripper, who lived in a cottage. Tarbell's brother Walter and his wife also came to live there after Walter suffered an emotional breakdown.

Mark Twain and other New York publishing people lived nearby and Tarbell frequently entertained friends there. Tarbell wrote of the work required on a farm:

"Things happened: the roof leaked; the grass must be cut if I was to have a comfortable sward to sit on; water in the house was imperative. And what I had not reckoned with came from all the corners of my land: incessant calls—fields calling to be rid of underbrush and weeds and turned to their proper work; a garden spot calling for a chance to show what it could do; apple trees begging to be trimmed and sprayed. I had bought an abandoned farm, and it cried loud to go about its business."

Tarbell wrote a series of essential articles at The American Magazine, in which she investigated tariffs and their impact on American businesses and consumers. Tarbell also traveled to Chicago to investigate their public transportation. She met Jane Addams and stayed at Hull House in 1908. There, she participated in the group's programs which included teaching immigrant women English, job and homemaking skills.

Tarbell and the other editors decided to sell The American Magazine to the Crowell Publishing company in 1911. John Phillips sold his remaining interests to Crowell Publishing Company in 1915. Phillips became a consultant to the magazine, John Siddell became the editor, and Tarbell turned to freelance writing.

Tarbell examined the positive side of American business in a series of articles written between 1912 and 1916. She toured the United States and met with factory owners and workers and their families. Tarbell said of her own muckraking reputation, "Was it not the duty of those who were called muckrakers to rake up the good earth as well as the noxious?" She was fascinated by Thomas Lynch of the Frick Coke Company, who was committed to providing decent living conditions for his workers and believed that "Safety First" was preferable to accidents. Tarbell also admired and wrote about Ford Motor Company founder Henry Ford and his belief that offering high pay would create excellent work, as well as his ideas around mass production.

== Women's suffrage ==
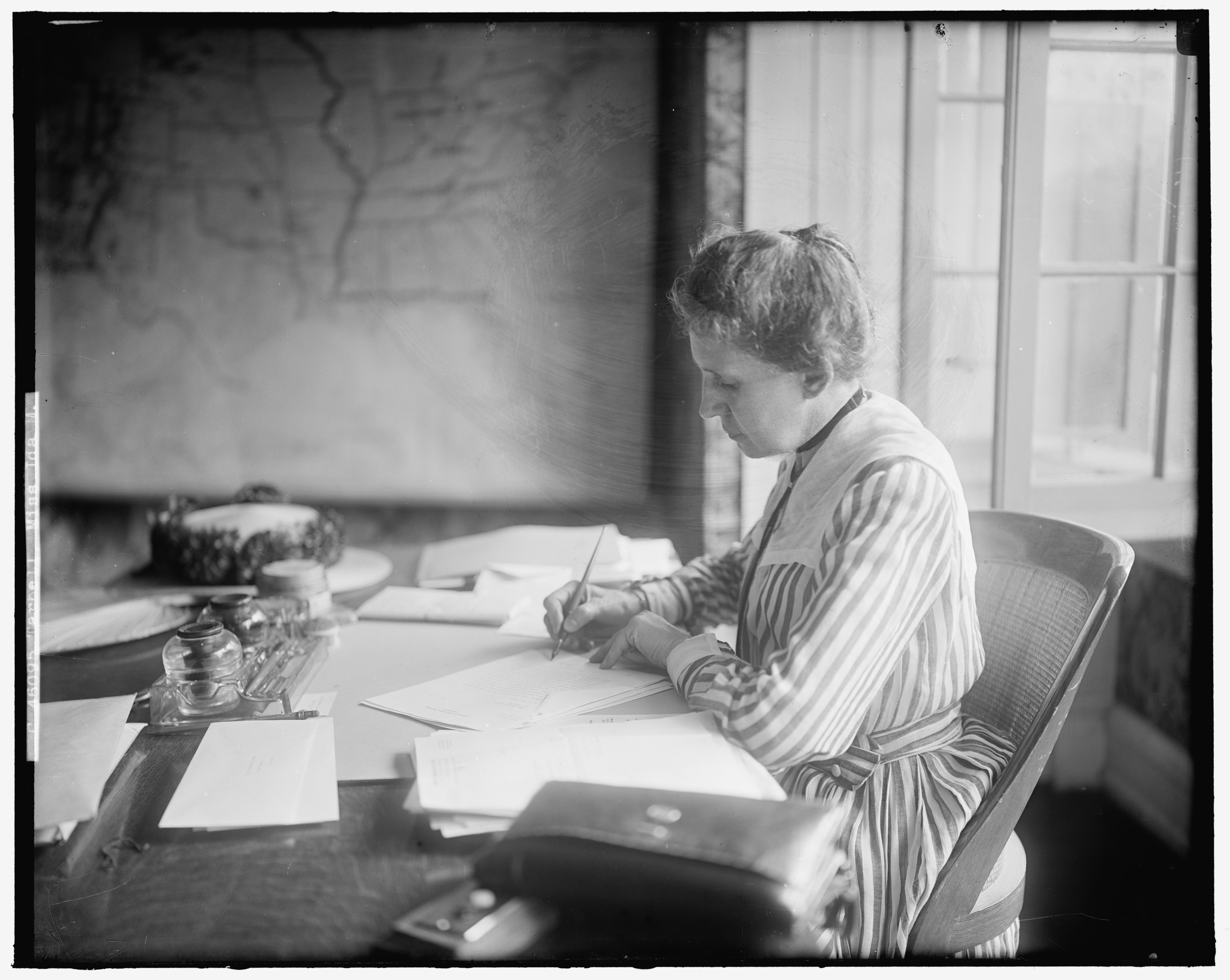
Ida M. Tarbell in 1905

Steve Weinberg wrote that Ida Tarbell was "a feminist by example, but not by ideology". Feminist scholars viewed Tarbell as an enigma as she seemed to both embrace the movement and act as a critic. While her accomplishments were many, Tarbell also challenged and questioned the logic of women's suffrage. Early in life, Tarbell was exposed to the suffrage movement when her mother hosted meetings in their home. Tarbell was put off by women such as Mary Livermore and Frances Willard who she said never paid attention to her. By contrast, Tarbell noted, the men her father hosted showed interest in her. Tarbell did say that the movement sparked in her a desire to attend college and receive an education.

Starting in 1909, Tarbell wrote more about women and traditional roles. Tarbell was alienated by the more militant aspects of the movement and described it as anti-male. She recommended that women embrace home life and the family, saying they had a "true role as wives, mothers, and homemakers". One biographer, Emily Arnold McCully, believed that her stance on women's issues may have tarnished her long-term legacy. Tarbell felt that "the drive for suffrage" was "a misguided war on men". Former allies among suffragists were dismayed at her change and her speaking to anti-suffragist organizations. Tarbell published the article "Making a Man of Herself" in The American Magazine in 1912, which infuriated her readers and activists. Historian Robert Stinson believed that she was making new public statements about the ambiguity she had lived in her own life, which defined women's roles based upon their nature and saw attempts to push the boundaries into men's realms as unnatural. McCully supposed "that suffrage was a human's rights issue seemed not to occur to her, perhaps because, as a historian, she was much better looking backward than she was at anticipating the future."

Tarbell collected her essays on women and published them in a book called The Business of Being a Woman. The book, which was poorly received, contained tributes to early supporters of women including Susan B. Anthony and Elizabeth Cady Stanton. Tarbell said of the book: "That title was like a red rag to many of my militant friends. The idea that woman had a business assigned by nature and society which was of more importance than public life disturbed them; even if it was so, they did not want it emphasized". Even Tarbell's own mother, Esther, who was a lifelong suffragist, criticized Ida's position.

Tarbell switched course and embraced suffrage after American women won the right to vote in 1920. She wrote an article for Good Housekeeping in 1924 to dispel the myth that suffrage had failed. She wrote: "twenty million women did vote and should vote." When asked if she believed that a woman would one day be President of the United States, Tarbell pointed out that women had ruled nations in some cases better than kings and pointed to examples of Catherine the Great of Russia, Louise of Mecklenburg-Strelitz of Prussia, Elizabeth I of England and Catherine de' Medici of France.

Tarbell worked to help women who had "no choice but to work, often under horrifying conditions." She wrote about workplace safety and covered the realities of factories where women worked. She became an advocate for Taylorism, a system for scientific management of production, encouraging its use in home economics. She became a member of the Taylor Society. She visited more than fifty-five businesses for the article, "The Golden Rule of Business," to see how "scientific management and Christian values" worked together. She decided it was the best way to protect workers and at the same time maximize profits.

Tarbell was a founding member of the Authors' League in 1914: a collective to support working writers which later became the Authors Guild.

Tarbell's career shifted in 1915 when American Magazine named John Siddall as editor. Tarbell joined the Chautauqua Science and Literary Circuit, a lecture and entertainment tour filled with public speakers, singers and other acts such as trained dogs and yodelers. Before the tour, Tarbell trained for public speaking with Frank Sargent of the American Academy of Dramatic Arts. The tour schedule was brutal. Tarbell said, "...I signed up for a seven weeks' circuit, forty-nine days in forty-nine different places". Tarbell was exhausted at the end but went on to sign up for more over the next few years. Tarbell lectured throughout the United States on subjects from the evils of war, peace, politics, trusts, tariffs, labor and labors of women.

== World War I ==
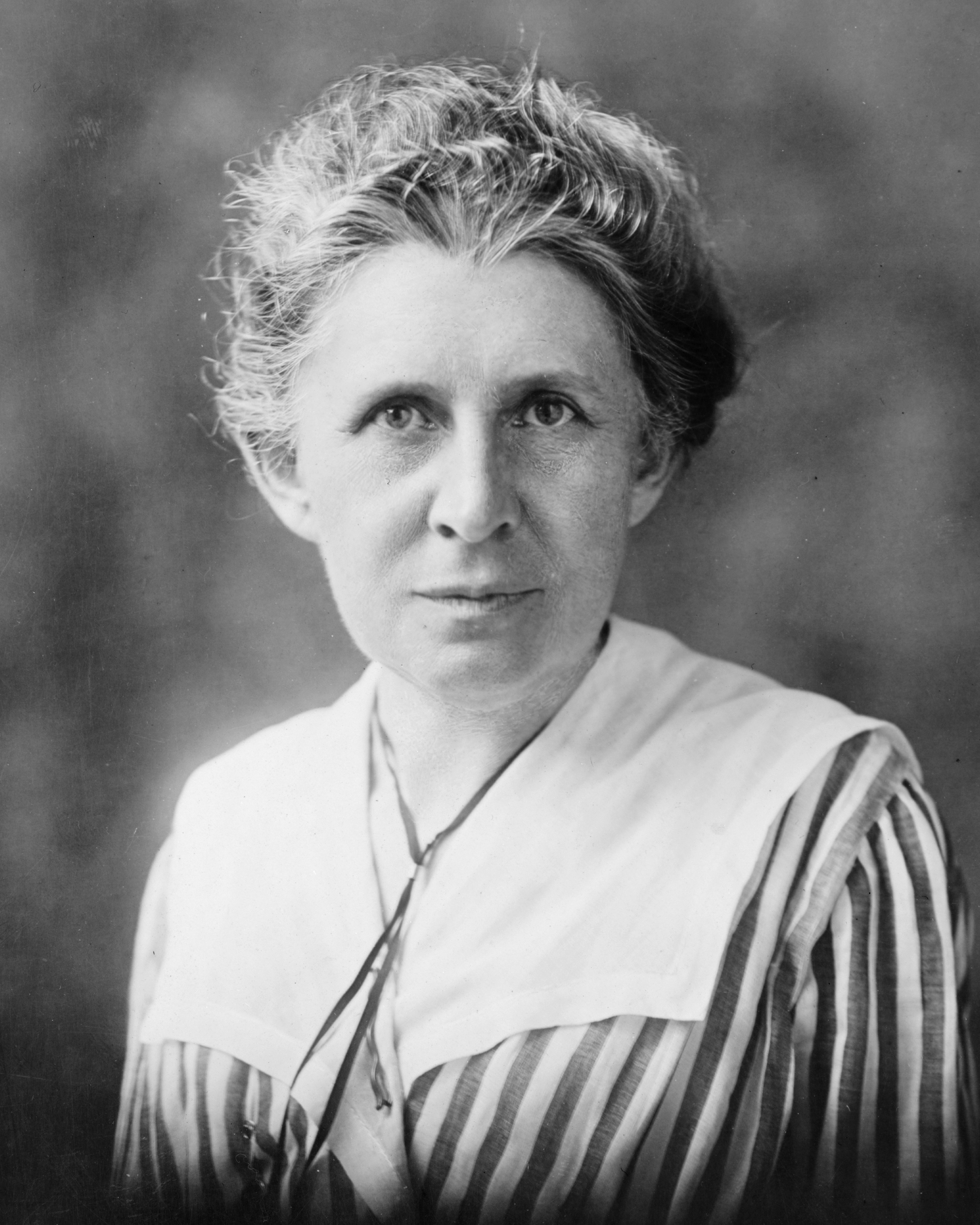
Ida Tarbell in 1917

When the United States entered World War I in April 1917, President Woodrow Wilson invited Tarbell to take part in a new committee: the Women's Committee of the Council of National Defense. The Suffragists on the committee were initially unhappy about Tarbell's appointment, but her "warmth and group spirit" won them over. The goal of the women's committee was to mobilize the war efforts of American women and the first issue addressed was a developing food crisis. The group encouraged women to plant vegetable gardens and promoted both drying and canning of foods. Other efforts included knitting, sewing, bandage making, and the opening of day-care centers to operate while women began working in factories. Tarbell often served as a go-between with the Men's Council and the Woman's Committee.

Tarbell had a number of setbacks in 1917. Her mother died in September, and upon Tarbell's return to Washington, D.C., the following year, Tarbell collapsed. She was sent to Johns Hopkins Hospital, where she was diagnosed with tuberculosis, and she spent three months in the hospital recovering. Tarbell also began showing beginning signs of Parkinson's disease. Her doctor did not share his diagnosis with her. It was not until years later, as her tremors worsened and affected her handwriting, that she finally learned of the diagnosis.

The Women's Committee was disbanded with the end of the war in 1918, and Tarbell traveled once again to Paris, France. Some of her former McClure's colleagues were also there for the Paris Peace Conference: John S. Phillips as editor of the Red Cross Magazine and Ray Stannard Baker as an assistant to President Woodrow Wilson. President Wilson had wanted Tarbell in the official U.S. legation, but, unbeknownst to Tarbell, Secretary of State Robert Lansing had refused to have a female on his team.

Tarbell wrote for the Red Cross magazine and interviewed Parisians about how the war had affected them. She also traveled to the countryside to interview farmers living in the wreckage of their former homes. Tarbell focused on the experience of the average Frenchwoman with such articles as "The French Woman and Her New World," "The Homing Instinct of Woman," and "That Brave Northwest."

== Later career ==
Tarbell's later career included writing, lecturing, and social work. Tarbell continued working as a freelancing journalist and traveling the lecture circuit. She served on two Presidential Conferences. Tarbell was a member of President Wilson's Industrial Conference in 1919, representing the Pen and Brush Club of Gramercy Park, New York City, and served on a committee looking into hours of labor along with Robert Brookings. Among recommendations of Tarbell's committee were protections aimed at the health of women workers including an eight-hour day, six-day work week and no work between the hours of 10 p.m. and 6 a.m. John D. Rockefeller Jr. was also a representative at the Conference. Tarbell also participated in President Warren G. Harding's 1921 Unemployment Conference, the conference suggested by Herbert Hoover to address a recession. Among the committees Tarbell served on were Organization, Public Works, Civic Emergency Measures, Publications, and Standing Committee of the Conference.

Tarbell published her only novel, The Rising of the Tide, in 1919. She wrote articles about the disarmament conference for McClure's syndicate and published them later in the book, Peacemakers—Blessed and Otherwise.

Tarbell also wrote another biography, this one of Judge Elbert H. Gary, the chairman of U.S. Steel Corporation. She was not initially interested in the biography, but Gary convinced her that if she uncovered any wrongdoings committed by his company, he meant to correct them. She earned $10,000 for the book, and although she thought her work was courageous, critics described her work as cowardly. One review was titled, "The Taming of Ida Tarbell," and accused her of falling in with her sworn enemy, big business.

Tarbell completed a series of articles on Benito Mussolini for McCall's magazine in the 1920s. The portrait Tarbell painted of Mussolini, comparing him to Napoleon, was flattering. Her former colleague, Viola Roseboro, remarked after meeting up with Tarbell in Italy, "I heard her let go about that dimple several times. All those things that are at such a variance with the old work horse she calls herself and to the serious worker she is and is known for pleases me a lot". It was speculated that in Tarbell's eyes she may have imagined Mussolini as "finishing the work of the Progressive Era at the small price of a few civil liberties".

Tarbell's final business biography was a profile of Owen D. Young, the president of General Electric and founder of Radio Corporation of America and then NBC. Amidst speculation that Young was gearing up for a Presidential run, the biography was reviewed as a campaign biography.

Tarbell was approached by Arthur Schlesinger Sr. to contribute to his series A History of American Life in 1923. She did not complete The Nationalizing of Business until 1936.

In addition to serving as the President of the Pen and Brush Club for 30 years beginning in 1913, Tarbell was also a member of the Colony Club and the Cosmopolitan Club.

== Death and legacy ==
Tarbell completed her autobiography, All in a Day's Work, in 1939 when she was 82. Reviews were mixed for the book. She was working on another book, Life After Eighty, when she died of pneumonia at Bridgeport Hospital in Bridgeport, Connecticut on January 6, 1944. She had been in the hospital since December 1943. She was 86.

In 1993 the Ida Tarbell House in Easton, Connecticut was declared a National Historic Landmark. In 2000, Tarbell was inducted posthumously into the National Women's Hall of Fame in Seneca Falls, New York. On September 14, 2002, the United States Postal Service issued a commemorative stamp honoring Tarbell as part of a series of four stamps honoring women journalists.

Long past Tarbell's life, she has received praise and accolades for her contribution to journalism and American history. Everett E. Dennis, Executive Director of the Freedom Forum Media Studies Center at Columbia University stated in 1993 that Tarbell helped invent modern journalism. Historian and Professor of History at the University of New Hampshire, Ellen F. FitzPatrick, called Tarbell one of the great American journalists of the 20th century. The History of the Standard Oil Company was listed as No. 5 in a 1999 list by New York University of the top 100 works of 20th-century American journalism. Historian Doris Kearns Goodwin, in her book The Bully Pulpit, would call Tarbell's series on Standard Oil, "a landmark series that would affirm her reputation as the leading investigative journalist of her day". Economic historian Daniel Yergin, in his Pulitzer-Prize winning book, The Prize: The Epic Quest for Oil, Money, and Power, described Tarbell's book on Standard Oil as arguably, "the single most influential book on business ever published in the United States".

The investigative techniques she developed while researching this volume influenced Steve Weinberg, one-time executive director of the non-profit Investigative Reporters and Editors, Inc., to base training programs for the NGO and classrooms using her methodology. While "yellow journalists" and muckrakers both rejected the notion of neutrality, "yellow journalists" focused on sensationalism and were not overly concerned with verifying the veracity of their stories. Muckrakers like Tarbell and Upton Sinclair, on the other hand, wrote detailed, thoroughly verified, and accurate descriptions of the social issues of their day, laying the groundwork for legal changes, ethical standards in journalism, and what is now known as investigative journalism.

"Tarbell", the non-partisan news publication of the non-profit "To Be Fair", is named after her.

== Writing style and methodology ==
Tarbell was known for her strong work ethic in writing. Tarbell's early background in the sciences brought a touch of scientific inquiry to her investigations. Each statement she made was supported by facts so much so that her early works have been described as drowning in facts. Her method was also scholarly and driven by the demands of magazine deadlines. She could dictate as many as twenty letters a day from a "To Be Answered" pile on her desk.

Tarbell was extremely thorough when conducting research. At the time she began Lincoln's biography, he had been dead for only 30 years, and Tarbell traveled far and wide interviewing Lincoln's contemporaries. Her research uncovered more than 300 documents including unpublished speeches, letters, pictures and personal anecdotes. It was through the use of well-selected anecdotes in her biographies that Tarbell was able to breathe life into the subject and offer new perspectives. When writing a biography, Tarbell suggested that the writer should "start by wiping out of his mind all that he knows about the man, start as if you had never before heard of him. Everything then is fresh, new. Your mind, feeding on this fresh material, sees things in a new way". Tarbell's inclusion of anecdotes gave new perspectives to her subjects. Tarbell double-checked the Lincoln articles for accuracy by sending them out to those whose information she had included.

Tarbell's writing has been described by a biographer as fair and professional, (though some later observers have been less kind, accusing her of cherry picking data to support her conclusions) and her methods have been used widely to train other investigative journalists. When conducting and presenting the details about Standard Oil's business practices she wanted to present her materials as historical documentation and narrative. Tarbell's technique in researching corporations through government documents, lawsuits, and interviews managed to break through a secretive corporation and evasive CEO.

Tarbell liked to work from a desk covered in research materials. While working on The History of Standard Oil, Tarbell worked from home in her study with a break once a day to go to the McClure's office. At home in New York, she sat on a bentwood chair at a partners desk with messy heaps of paper. Tarbell would gather the books, transcripts, and clippings she needed, put them in order and write. When a chapter was finished and handed in, she reviewed the material again and rearranged its order for her next installment. On her Connecticut farm, Tarbell worked from a mahogany desk in a sunny library.

== Representation in other media ==
Charles Klein's political play, The Lion and the Mouse (1905), opened soon after Tarbell's series on Standard Oil had been published in McClure's Magazine, and the plot was thought to be based on her campaign. (Its title is that of an Aesop's fable.) Its 686 continuous performances set a record for any American play in New York, and four road companies took the play on the road.

Drunk History Season 5 Episode 6 titled "Underdogs" features Shannon Woodward as Tarbell. Retelling by John Gabrus.

== Selected works ==
=== Books ===
- —— (1895). A Short Life of Napoleon Bonaparte. McClure's magazine library; no. 1. New York: S. S. McClure. hdl:2027/uc2.ark:/13960/t46q1w061.
- —— (1896). Madame Roland: a biographical study. New York: Scribner's.
- Dana, Charles Anderson (1898). Recollections of the Civil War. New York: D. Appleton & Company. — nominally by Charles Anderson Dana, was actually written by Ida Tarbell; it was "a biographical essay disguised as a memoir."
- —— (1900). The Life of Abraham Lincoln. Vol. 1–2. New York: McClure Phillips. hdl:2027/loc.ark:/13960/t3vt1rn71.
- —— (1901). A Life of Napoleon Bonaparte: with a sketch of Josephine, Empress of the French. New York: Macmillan.
- —— (1904). The History of the Standard Oil Company. Vol. 1–2. New York: McClure.
- —— (1907). He Knew Lincoln. New York: Doubleday Page. hdl:2027/uiuo.ark:/13960/t4th8cv47.
- —— (1909). Father Abraham. New York: Moffat, Yard and Company.
- —— (1911). The Tariff in Our Times. New York: Macmillan Company.
- —— (1912). The Business of Being a Woman. New York: Macmillan.
- —— (1915). The Ways of Woman. New York: Macmillan.
- —— (1916). New Ideals in Business, An Account of Their Practice and Their Effects upon Men and Profits. New York: Macmillan.
- —— (1919). The Rising of the Tide; The Story of Sabinsport. New York: Macmillan.
- —— (1920). In Lincoln's Chair. New York: Macmillan.
- —— (1921). Boy Scouts' Life of Lincoln. New York: Macmillan.
- —— (1922). He Knew Lincoln, and Other Billy Brown Stories. New York: Macmillan.
- —— (1922). Peacemakers—Blessed and Otherwise: Observations, Reflections and Irritations at an International Conference. New York: Macmillan.
- —— (1925). The Life of Elbert H. Gary: The Story of Steel. New York: D. Appleton & Co.
- —— (1929). A Reporter for Lincoln: Story of Henry E. Wing, Soldier and Newspaperman. New York: Book League of America.
- —— (1932). Owen D. Young: A New Type of Industrial Leader. New York: Macmillan Company.
- —— (1939). All in the Day's Work: An Autobiography. New York: Macmillan Company.

=== Selected articles ===
- "The Arts and Industries of Cincinnati." Chautauquan, December 1886, 160–62.
- "Women as Inventors." Chautauquan, March 1887, 355–57.
- "Women in Journalism." Chautauquan, April 1887, 393–95.
- "Pasteur at Home." McClure's Magazine, September 1893, 327–40.
- "In the Streets of Paris." New England Magazine, November 1893, 259–64.
- "The Identification of Criminals." McClure's Magazine, March 1894, 355–69.
- "Napoleon Bonaparte." McClure's Magazine, November 1894 – April 1895.
- "Abraham Lincoln." McClure's Magazine, November 1895 – November 1896.
- "The History of the Standard Oil Company." McClure's Magazine, November 1902 – July 1903; December 1903 – October 1904.
- "John D. Rockefeller: A Character Study." Parts 1 and 2. McClure's Magazine, July 1905, 227–49; August 1905, 386–97.
- "Commercial Machiavellianism." McClure's Magazine, March 1906, 453–63.
- "Tariff in Our Times." American Magazine, December 1906, January 1907, March–June 1907.
- "Roosevelt vs. Rockefeller." American Magazine, December 1907 – February 1908.
- "The American Woman." American Magazine, November 1909 – May 1910.
- "The Uneasy Woman." American Magazine, January 1912.
- "The Business of Being a Woman." American Magazine, March 1912, 563–68.
- "Flying — A Dream Come True!" American Magazine, November 1913, 65–66.
- "The Golden Rule in Business" American Magazine, October 1914 – September 1915.
- "Florida — and Then What?" McCall's Magazine, May–August 1926.
- "The Greatest Story in the World Today?" McCall's Magazine, November 1926 – February 1927.
- "As Ida Tarbell Looks at Prohibition" Delineator, October 1930, 17.

== See also ==
- The Hepburn Committee (1879)
