= Ida Tarbell House =

Historic house in Connecticut, United States

- U.S. National Register of Historic Places
- U.S. National Historic Landmark
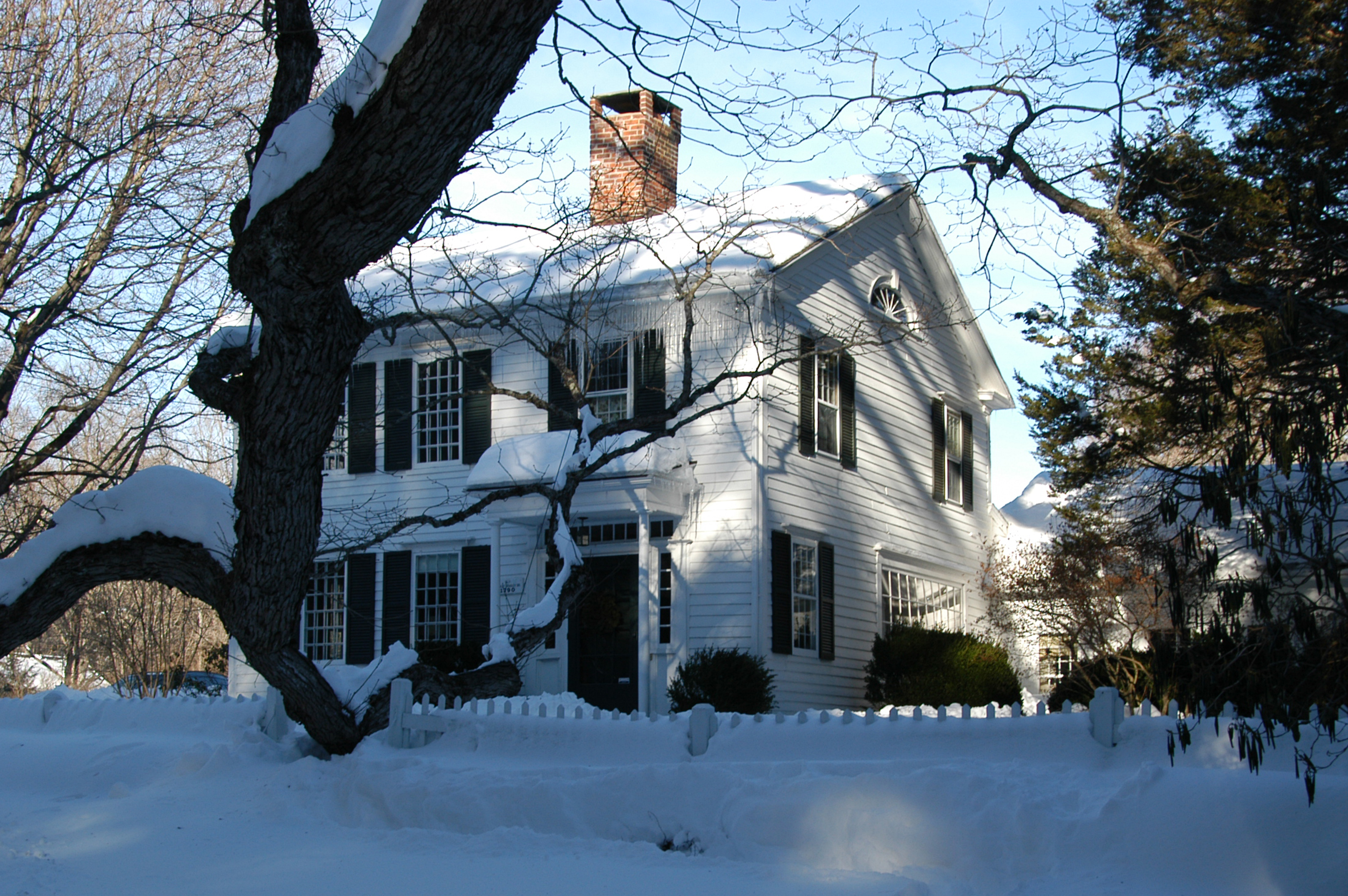

- Location within Connecticut Location within the United States
- Location: 320 Valley Road, Easton, Connecticut
- Coordinates: 41°17′14.353″N 73°19′34.5″W
- Area: less than one acre
- Architectural style: Vernacular
- NRHP reference No.: 93001602

Significant dates
- Added to NRHP: April 19, 1993
- Designated NHL: April 19, 1993

The Ida Tarbell House is a historic house at 320 Valley Road in Easton, Connecticut. A simple farmhouse dubbed "Twin Oaks", it was the home of muckraking journalist Ida Tarbell (1857-1944) from 1906 until her death. She purchased the property with proceeds from her two-volume book on the Standard Oil Company. Most of her writing after 1906 was done in the study on the first floor. The house was declared a National Historic Landmark in 1993 for its association with Tarbell's professional life.

== Description and history ==
The Tarbell House is a vernacular two-story, wood-frame structure, with a side gable roof, clapboard siding, and stone foundation. It is three asymmetrical bays wide, with a central brick chimney. The entrance is in the rightmost bay, with sidelight and transom windows and a shed-roofed portico supported by Doric columns and pilasters. The main block has been extended by a number of additions, most of which predate Ida Tarbell's ownership of the property. Only one addition, a sunroom, was made after her death. The property includes several outbuildings, including two barns and a caretaker's cottage, which were already extant during Tarbell's ownership.

Ida Tarbell was born in Erie County, Pennsylvania, to middle-class parents, whose livelihood was at one point threatened by the actions of the Standard Oil trust. Their involvement in the women's rights movement convinced Tarbell to gain an education, and to avoid marriage. She rose to prominence as a writer for McClure's magazine, producing thoroughly researched articles on a variety of topics. Her major success was a multi-part series on Standard Oil, which was later published in book form as The History of the Standard Oil Company in 1904. Her techniques, which involved poring over large numbers of documents and interviewing many people, were the first significant use of techniques of what is now called investigative journalism. Her exposés, and those of other socially motivated journalists such as Upton Sinclair, led to them being called "muckrakers" by President Theodore Roosevelt.

Tarbell purchased the property she called "Twin Oaks" in 1906, paying for it from the royalty income of the Standard Oil book. She used it as a retreat from the city, and did much writing there, producing a number of significant works. She made it her retirement home in 1924, and died in nearby Bridgeport in 1944.

== See also ==
- List of National Historic Landmarks in Connecticut
- National Register of Historic Places listings in Fairfield County, Connecticut

== Gallery ==
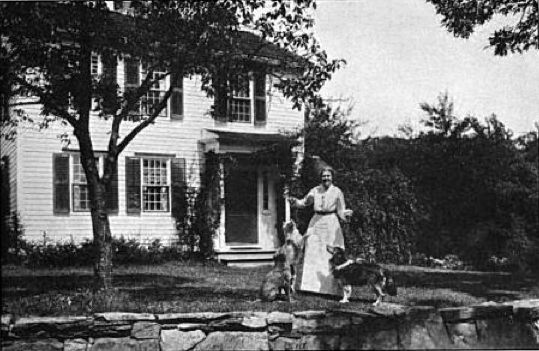
Ida Tarbell in front of the house (1915)

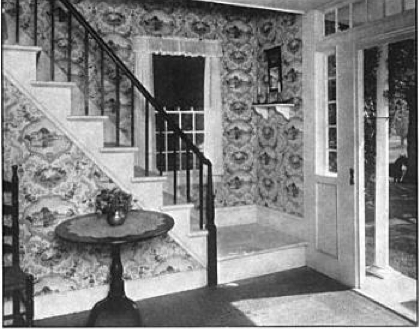
Entry and stairwell

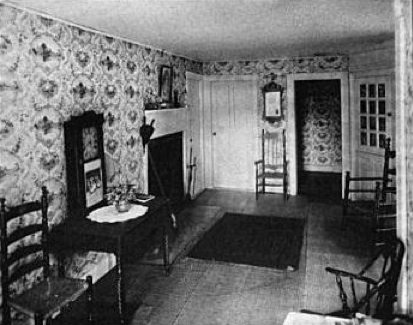
Living room

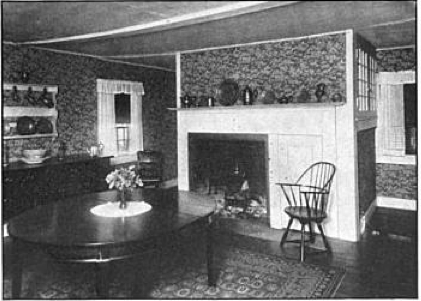
Dining room

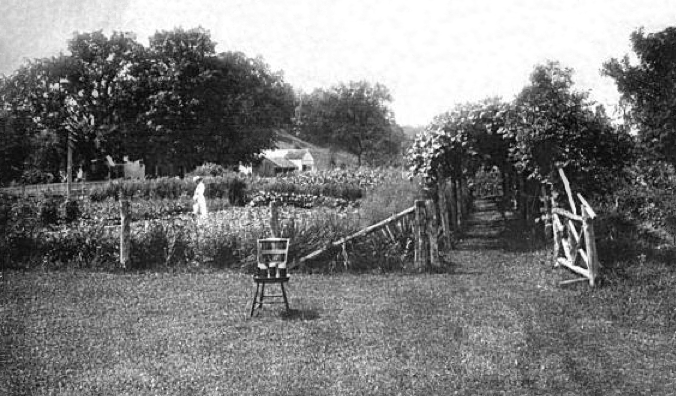
Garden

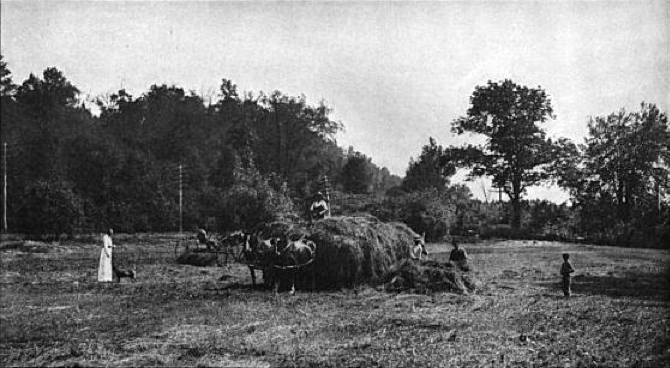
Farm
