= Dāvids Beika =

Latvian Communist politician

Dāvids Beika (Russian: Давид Самуилович Бейка; 30 August 1885 – 6 February 1946) was a Latvian Marxist revolutionary and political activist, publicist and Soviet intelligence officer.

== Biography ==
Beika was born in to a peasant family and worked as a teacher. He joined the Russian Social Democratic Labour Party in 1903 and the Latvian Social Democratic Party in 1905.

He was an active participant in the Russian Revolution of 1905 and after the defeat of the revolution he emigrated to the United States where he became a leading figure of the Latvian Social Democratic Federation in America.

Beika returned to Russia after the February Revolution and to Latvia after the October Revolution and became a leader of the Latvian Socialist Soviet Republic where he was appointed Commissar of Industry. After the fall of the Soviet republic he went back to what was now Soviet Russia and became the head of the economic council of Pskov.

He was a member of the Central Committee of the Communist Party of Latvia and was a delegate of the second and third congresses of the Communist International and was elected a member of its Executive Committee and then head of the International Liaison Department of the Comintern in 1920.

From January 1922 he worked in the Smolensk province and in 1924, he was appointed executive secretary of the Smolensk Provincial Committee of the All-Union Communist Party(b). Later he worked as the secretary of the Arkhangelsk Provincial Committee of the All-Union Communist Party (b). From 1928 he was in economic work and was a representative of member of the Collegium of the People's Commissariat of Heavy Industry of the USSR.

During the Spanish Civil War he was a military commissar in the International Brigades from 1936 to 1937 and then from 1937 to 1938 he was Comintern officer in the United States.

Beika was recalled to Moscow, and on 20 April 1938 he was arrested by the NKVD on charges of participating in an anti-Soviet nationalist terrorist organization, and on 22 April 1939, by the verdict of the Military Collegium of the Supreme Court of the Soviet Union, he was sentenced to twenty years in a forced labor camp.

On 6 February 1946 he died in the Ustvymlag of the Komi Autonomous Soviet Socialist Republic. On 22 February 1956 he was posthumously rehabilitated.

Dāvids Beika was also an author of poems and memoirs.
