= Alfred Tilton =

Alfred Tilton or Alfred Matisovich Tyltyn (Russian: Альфред Матисович Тылтынь, Latvian: Alfrēds Tiltiņš; 4 March 1897 – 11 February 1942) was the head of Soviet Military Intelligence (GRU) in the United States in the late 1920s. He is best remembered for having recruited Latvian-American communist Nicholas Dozenberg to work for the GRU late in 1927.

== Early life ==
Alfred Tilton was born on 4 March 1897, in Mežotne parish, Latvia, then part of the Russian Empire. Tilton was the son of peasants of ethnic Latvian descent.

A well-educated individual, Tilton eventually learned Russian, German, French, and English as well as his native Latvian.

== Education ==
Tilton graduated from the Alexseev Military College in 1916.

== Career ==
Tilton was a company commander in the Latvian 3rd Infantry Regiment, attaining the rank of Lieutenant. He also underwent machine gun training in 1917.

Tilton joined the Russian Communist Party in 1918 and was a Brigade Commander in the Red Army during the Russian Civil War. Tilton was captured by the Poles during the 1920 invasion of Poland and held as a prisoner of war, eventually gaining his repatriation to Soviet Russia in a February 1921 prisoner exchange. Upon his return, Tilton was enrolled in the Military Academy of the Red Army, where he studied until 1922. Leaving the Military Academy in 1922, Tilton became an active participant in Soviet military intelligence operations abroad. Tilton acted as the GRU's underground rezident (station head) in Paris from 1922 to 1926. During this interval Tilton also took courses at the Polytechnic Institute of Air and Motors in Paris.

Tilton worked for military intelligence in Germany during 1926 and 1927 before being transferred to New York City, where he became the GRU's rezident. While in New York, Tilton and his wife, Maria, made use of a cover story that they were Mr. and Mrs. Joseph Paquett, from Canada. The pair also used the name Mr. and Mrs. Alfred Martin during this time. As part of his job in America, late in 1927 Tilton made the acquaintance of Workers (Communist) Party functionary Nicholas Dozenberg, convincing him to drop out from organized party activity and to go to work for the GRU.

Tilton was recalled to the USSR in the summer of 1930. He served as the Assistant Commander of a mechanized brigade from July 1930 to March 1931 and was the head of Belorussian mechanized troops from March 1931 to March 1932. From March 1932 to June 1936, Tilton served as the Commander and Commissar of the 5th Detached Mechanized Brigade in the town of Borisov. From June 1936 to November 1937, Tilton served in the Spanish Civil War fighting in the defense of the Spanish Republic.

=== Arrest, death, and legacy ===
Tilton was arrested on 27 November 1937, during the height of the Great Terror. He did not immediately plead guilty to alleged crimes, however, only being sentenced on 15 December 1940, well after the fall of Secret Police head Nikolai Ezhov.

Tilton was sentenced to a term of 15 years imprisonment in a labor camp of the Gulag, a sentence which ultimately proved fatal due to the starvation-level of provisions allowed prisoners during World War II.

== Personal life ==
Tilton died on 11 February 1942.

Tilton was posthumously rehabilitated by the Khrushchev government on 26 March 1957.

== Awards ==
Tilton was recipient of the Order of the Red Banner on three separate occasions (1920, 1922, and 1928) and the Order of Lenin in 1936.
