= Nicholas Dozenberg =

American communist

Nicholas Dozenberg (Latvian: Nikolajs Dozenbergs; 15 November 1882 – 1954) was an American political functionary with the Communist Party USA in the 1920s. Late in 1927 Dozenberg was recruited into the underground Soviet military intelligence network, for which he worked for more than a decade under the pseudonym "Nicholas Ludwig Dallant." Apprehended by the Federal Bureau of Investigation in December 1939, Dozenberg cooperated with the investigation fully, giving oral or written testimony before the House Committee on Un-American Activities (HUAC) on three occasions. Never charged for espionage, Dozenberg pleaded guilty to a charge of passport fraud in 1940 and received a comparatively light jail term of one year and one day. He lived a quiet and private life following his release from prison in 1941.

== Early years ==
Nicholas Dozenberg was born November 15, 1882, in Riga, Russian Empire, today the capital of Latvia, the son of a farmer. He attended school in the town of Talsi.

Dozenberg emigrated to the United States in 1904, settling in the Boston suburb of Roxbury, Massachusetts, center of a large Latvian community. He worked there in a plant making artificial marble, in an iron foundry and, during 1906 -1919 period, as a railroad locomotive machinist. He was a member of the International Association of Machinists from 1908 and the treasurer of IAM Lodge 391 in 1917 and its president in 1918.

Dozenberg was naturalized as an American citizen in the United States District Court at Boston in February 1911.

Dozenberg was twice married. He married his first wife, Ancit (commonly known as "Katherine" and to some as "Anita"), in 1906. She died while they were away together in China in 1936. Later in 1936 he married Frances Davis Delawder, who gave birth to the couple's only child, a daughter, on January 1, 1938. Claiming no knowledge of her husband's activities, Francis Dozenberg had their marriage annulled in 1940, following Nick's arrest.

== Political career ==
About 1908, Dozenberg became a member of the Latvian Workmen's Association, an organization which later affiliated with the Socialist Party of America as a group to become its Latvian Socialist Federation.

Together with the majority of the Latvian Federation, Dozenberg joined the Communist Party of America (CPA) at the time of its formation in the summer of 1919. At the time of the actual split, he was living in Canada and working temporarily for his sister and her husband as a clerk in a general store.

In 1921, Dozenberg moved to Chicago to become business manager of The Voice of Labor, a legal weekly publication of the underground CPA edited by Jack Carney. He remained in that position until the paper's termination by the party in 1923.

Upon the termination of The Voice of Labor, Dozenberg became the "Literature Director" of the Workers Party of America, the legal embodiment of the then-underground CPA. Dozenberg remained at the head of the party's Literature Department until 1926, when Communist Party headquarters were moved from Chicago to New York City.

Dozenberg was active in Workers Party affairs and was a delegate from the Chicago district to the organization's December 1922 convention in New York City. Dozenberg was a loyalist of the faction headed by WPA Executive Secretary C.E. Ruthenberg, Hungarian John Pepper, and top Ruthenberg lieutenant Jay Lovestone throughout the 1920s and was a beneficiary of their political patronage.

In February 1925, Dozenberg stood for election as the candidate of the Workers Party for Chicago City Council in the 28th Ward.

Dozenberg was listed on the masthead of The Worker, the party's surviving weekly as its business manager in 1924, but in 1940 Congressional testimony he had no recollection of having held this position. He was similarly listed as business manager of The Liberator, the Workers Party's literary and artistic-related monthly magazine from New York, in the same period but likewise retained no recollection of having held that post. He did, however, freely acknowledge having been head of the Literature Department of the Workers (Communist) Party from 1924 until the move of party headquarters back to New York City in 1927. His listings on the masthead of these publications may have been pro forma.

At the time of the move of headquarters back to New York City, Dozenberg handled the liquidation of the Party's assets in Chicago and arranged the transfer of the party's publications office.

With the relocation of party headquarters to New York, Dozenberg assumed a new party job, heading the Workers' Publishing Society, located on 125th Street in New York City.

=== Espionage activity ===
Towards the end of in 1927, the head of Soviet military intelligence (GRU) in the United States, Alfred Tilton, recruited Dozenberg into the Soviet military intelligence apparatus at a salary of $35 per week. Dozenberg stopped paying dues and dropped out of the Communist Party at this time so as to lower his profile with the American secret service.

Tilton first made contact with Dozenberg when he was still in Chicago in 1927, liquidating the print shop. Tilton wrote Dozenberg a letter in Latvian signed simply "Alfred," asking Dozenberg to meet him in New York as soon as he relocated there. Tilton met with Dozenberg in a restaurant in New York City about a month later and asked Dozenberg to enter his service, without specifying the exact service in question.

Dozenberg dropped out of the Communist Party on instructions and began meeting frequently with Tilton, obtaining a first passport under the pseudonym of "Nicholas Dallant" in March 1928 and a second one underhis own name in November of that same year. At the end of the year he was called to Moscow to be assessed by Yan Karlovich Berzin, the head of Soviet Military Intelligence.

Dozenberg testified to Congress that in the early 1930s he was dispatched on a mission to Bucharest, Romania, to establish a motion picture company which was to be a front for Soviet military intelligence. Not only would the firm provide a plausible business cover for agents coming and going, but a company purportedly making movies would have a relatively easy time surreptitiously filming ports and military fortifications, it was believed. Dozenberg also established a business cover for Soviet military intelligence operations in France.

In 1931, after traveling between Germany, the Soviet Union, and Romania in the previous year, Dozenberg returned to the United States and established the American Rumanian Film Corporation in New York. This, too, served as a business front for Soviet military intelligence.

in 1932, in conjunction with his efforts to establish the American Rumanian Film Corporation, Dozenberg became involved in a scheme to pass counterfeit American currency produced in Moscow, with the proceeds to be used to finance his and other Soviet intelligence activities. Dr. William Burtan, an adherent of Jay Lovestone's Communist Party of the USA (Opposition) group, was also involved in this operation. Burtan was arrested, leading to the failure of the scheme.

Early in 1933, Dozenberg was called to Moscow, where he reportedly spent most of that year. Towards the end of 1933, Dozenberg was dispatched to China on a new mission establishing yet another business cover for GRU operations, this time with a view to gaining information about Japan. He spent the next four years in the country, running the Amasia Sales Company in Tientsin on behalf of Soviet military intelligence.

Dozenberg returned to Moscow in 1937 to report on his activities in China. There he was instructed to establish a similar business cover for the GRU in the Philippine Islands. Dozenberg arrived in New York City on July 15 and began to make arrangements to represent a motion-picture equipment corporation in the Philippines. Dozenberg quickly ran out of funds in Manila, however, returning to the United States in July 1938. Dozenberg again returned to Moscow, where he remained for two and a half months before being dispatched on another mission in the United States.

Dozenberg recruited others into the service of the GRU, including Philip Aronberg, who by the middle 1930s had himself become a GRU agent handler. Others whom Dozenberg recruited included Albert Feierabend and Robert Zelms (alias Elmston), Latvian communists from Boston.

Dozenberg was "outted" by Benjamin Gitlow on September 9, 1939. He fled Washington, D.C., and was located three months later in Bend, Oregon, where he was working in a grocery store. On December 9, 1939, Dozenberg was arrested and charged with passport violations.

=== Congressional testimony ===
In January 1940, Dozenberg pleaded guilty to passport fraud and was sentenced to prison. While in jail, he was called before the House Committee on Un-American Activities (HUAC) to give testimony on secret Soviet intelligence operations in America. Dozenberg gave public testimony on May 20, 1940, and testimony with the committee moving behind closed doors and continuing in executive session on the next day, with the closed-door testimony was made later published in book form by the U.S. Government Printing Office the following year.

In his 1940 testimony before HUAC, Dozenberg detailed the story of his life and his recruitment into the GRU by Alfred Tilton.

In light of his forthright cooperation with Congress and the Federal Bureau of Investigation, Dozenberg was never charged for his espionage activities. He served a sentence of one year plus one day on his passport fraud conviction.

== Later years ==
Following his release from prison in 1941, Dozenberg moved to Florida and adopted the name "Dallant." He lived his remaining years out of the public eye, breaking his silence only in the fall of 1949 when he issued a signed affidavit recounting his life to the House Committee on Un-American Activities (HUAC) in response to a reopening of the investigation of his activities by Congress in that year.

== Death and legacy ==
Nicholas Dozenberg died in Florida of Parkinson's disease in 1954.

== See also ==
- GRU —The Soviet military intelligence agency, Glavnoe Razvedyvatel'noe Upravleniе, "Main Intelligence Directorate."

== Congressional testimony ==
- House Committee on Un-American Activities, Investigation of Un-American Propaganda Activities in the United States: Volume 13. Washington: US Government Printing Office, 1940; pp. 8137–8161. —Public testimony of May 20, 1940.
- House Committee on Un-American Activities, Investigation of Un-American Propaganda Activities in the United States: Executive Hearings, Volume 2. Washington: US Government Printing Office, 1941; pp. 563–653. —Executive Session testimony of May 21, 1940.
- House Committee on Un-American Activities, Hearings Regarding Communist Espionage, 81st Congress, Nov. 8, 1949. Washington: US Government Printing Office, 1951; pp. 3540–3542. —Written statement of October 4, 1949.
