= Latvian Socialist Federation =

Latvian-American emigrant organization

- Formation: 1905
- Dissolved: 1935
- Location: Boston, US

Latvian Socialist Federation (Latvian: Latviešu sociālistu koporganizācija), more commonly referred to as the Latvian Social Democratic Federation (Latvian: Latviešu sociāldemokrātu koporganizācija) in Latvian literature, was a revolutionary Latvian emigrant organization in the United States.

The federation published its own newspaper under the names "Worker" (Latvian: "Strādnieks", 1906–1919), "Morning" (Latvian: "Rīts", 1919–1923) and "Worker's Morning" (Latvian: "Strādnieku Rīts", 1923–1935).

== History ==
=== Background ===
Starting in the 1880s, Latvians began to emigrate from the Russian Empire to the United States. In 1889, one of the first Latvian public organizations was established in Boston – the Boston Latvian Society (Latvian: Bostonas Latviešu biedrība), from which the Boston Latvian Workers' Society (Latvian: Bostonas Latviešu strādnieku biedrība) split off in 1893. In 1896, the first Latvian press in the United States – "America's Journal" (Latvian: "Amerikas Vēstnesis") – also began to be published in Boston.

Due to the repression of the New Currentists in Russia in the late 1890s, the emigration of Latvian Social Democrats to the United States intensified in 1896. In 1898, one of the New Current leaders, Dāvids Bundža, also emigrated, and in the same year he founded the Latvian Social Democratic Union in Boston. In 1903, it united with the Western European Latvian Social Democratic Union (Latvian: Vakareiropas latviešu sociāldemokrātu savienība), forming the Latvian Social Democratic Union (Latvian: Latviešu sociāldemokrātu savienība), which was adjacent to the Socialist Revolutionary Party.

=== Creation ===
In 1905, an organization called Latvian Social Democrats was formed. After the outbreak of the 1905 revolution, American newspapers widely reported on Latvians as revolutionaries for the first time. A new wave of emigration came after the suppression of the revolution, when many political emigrants went to the United States to escape tsarist punitive expeditions and repressions for participating in the revolution.

In 1907, the organization was reformed as the American Latvian Social Democratic Federation. Its main task was to involve Latvian workers who had emigrated to the United States and Canada in revolutionary activities and to coordinate the activities of Latvian social democratic emigrant groups. The federation was led by its central committee, which was located in Boston.

=== Participation in the Socialist Party of America ===
In 1909, several Latvian social democrat groups joined the Socialist Party of America (SPA) and the federation became part of the SPA as an autonomous federation and was renamed the Latvian Social Democratic Federation of the Socialist Party of America. Its operating principles were onwards determined by the SPA statutes, congresses, and referendums.

Federation's membership grew to 1,001 people by 1911 (total Latvian population in the United States around that time numbered ~11,000), and from 1910 the federation was dominated by the Mensheviks. Starting in 1915, the majority of the federation's central committee sided with the Bolsheviks, and the federation's membership in the US and Canada reached 1,600. Latvian Bolsheviks had enormous influence in the SPA's left wing. The activities of Latvian Bolsheviks also significantly influenced the Bolshevization of the rest of the SPA, and they translated Lenin's articles from the underground press, which were published in the federation's newspaper "Strādnieks" and then in the rest of the American press. Thanks to this activity, the Socialist Propaganda League of America was established in the premises of the Latvian federation in Boston in 1912–1913, and its monthly publication "The Internationalist" became the first American newspaper to be influenced by Bolshevik propaganda.

During this time, the leading members of the federation were prominent Latvian revolutionaries Žanis Millers (Jānis Šepte), Dāvids Beika, Sīmanis Berģis, Jānis Bērziņš-Ziemelis, Arnolds Neibuts, Jānis Ozols-Zars, Fricis Roziņš and Kristaps Salniņš. After the February Revolution, many of them returned to Latvia, and would take leading roles in the October Revolution and the Russian Civil War, as well as hold various government positions in the USSR until the Latvian Operation of the NKVD.

=== Participation in the American Communist movement ===
The federation played a huge role in the founding of the Communist Party of America (CPA) in 1919 and became part of the CPA as the Latvian Social Democratic Federation of the Communist Party of America. Members of the federation, such as Kārlis Jansons (Charles E. Scott), Nikolajs Dozenbergs, Roberts Celms (Robert Zelms), Vilis Dermanis, etc. participated in the activities of the CPA.

Along with the Russian Federation, the Latvian Federation, under the leadership of the American communist John J. Ballam, was the main opponent of legal work and cooperation with the rival Communist Labor Party of America (CLPA) before the two parties' rivalry was ended by order of the Comintern.

After the CPU and the CLPA united into the CPUSA, the federation continued to function as a remnant of the opposition in the United Toilers of America, and in 1923 was renamed to the American Latvian Workers' Federation. During the 1920s, it continued to decline and lose its influence, and Latvian groups outside the CPUSA split into 3 main streams: 1. the "underground" part of the old opposition around the federation, which degenerated into uncompromising and endless opposition to the Comintern, due to its inability to adapt to the decline of the revolutionary period; 2. a group that was de facto inactive in the revolutionary movement, dominated by pessimism and an inability to adapt to the changes of the times; 3. a smaller opportunist group that adopted an "Americanist" identity and assimilated into the US economic and cultural way of life as prosperous farmers, well-paid and skilled craftsmen, and highly educated workers.

The federation was liquidated in 1935.

== Literature ==
- Dūma, Līga; Paeglīte, Dzidra (1976). Revolucionārie latviešu emigranti ārzemēs, 1897-1919 [Revolutionary Latvian emigrants abroad, 1897-1919] (in Latvian). Riga: Liesma.
