= Wealth Against Commonwealth =

Book by Henry Demarest Lloyd

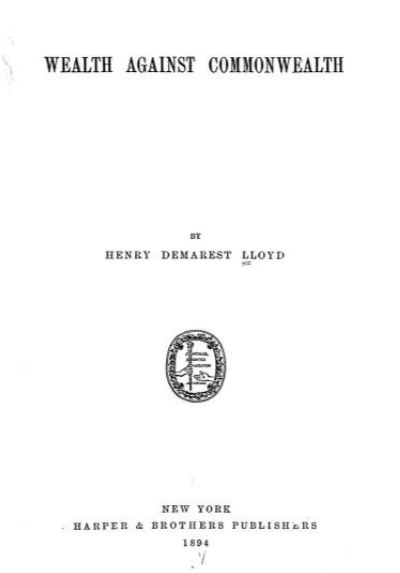
- Title page for Wealth Against Commonwealth (1894)
- Author: Henry Demarest Lloyd
- Language: English
- Published: 1894 New York: Harper & Brothers
- Publication place: United States
- Media type: Print

Wealth Against Commonwealth is a book published in 1894 by muckraking journalist Henry Demarest Lloyd. It was published after he had written several essays to The Atlantic Monthly concerning issues with dominating monopolies. It was written in an effort to disparage Standard Oil but also discusses other companies and industrialists. The book contributed significantly to further rallying the Progressive Movement in the early twentieth century.
