= Communist Labor Party of America =

American political party

- Founded: August 31, 1919
- Dissolved: May 1921
- Split from: Socialist Party of America
- Merged into: Communist Party USA
- Ideology: Communism; Marxism
- Political position: Far-left
- International affiliation: Communist International
- Colors: Red

The Communist Labor Party of America (CLPA) was one of the organizational predecessors of the Communist Party USA.

The group was established at the end of August 1919 following a three-way split of the Socialist Party of America. Although a legal political party at the time of its formation, with a form of organization closely resembling that of the Socialist Party whence it sprung, the group was quickly forced underground by the Palmer Raids of January 1920 and thereafter conducted its activities in secret.

The group merged with a dissident faction of the Communist Party of America in May 1921 to form the United Communist Party of America.

== Organizational history ==
=== Background ===
Former United Mine Workers functionary Adolph Germer, Executive Secretary of the Socialist Party of America, was one of the leaders of the Regular faction that forced the Communist Labor Party of America to split

With the end of World War I and the consolidation of the Bolshevik Revolution in 1918, long running tension in the Socialist Party of America (SPA) between the revolutionary socialist left-wing and the electorally-oriented center deepened. Radicals were particularly disheartened by the tepid 1916 campaign of "colorless" Socialist presidential candidate Allan L. Benson—an effort which saw the first reduction in the party's tally in presidential voting in party history.

From roots in the Boston-based Socialist Propaganda League of America and the Boston newspaper The Revolutionary Age, an organized faction calling itself the Left Wing Section of the Socialist Party emerged at the end of 1918. Radical editor Louis C. Fraina composed a Left Wing Manifesto, around which the Left Wing Section organized itself, holding raucous meetings of SPA locals and branches to force endorsement of the program and running a slate of candidates in the SPA's annual election in an attempt to "capture" and remold the party according to the Russian Bolshevik Party's model.

Buoyed by the bloc voting of radical, Bolshevik-influenced branches of the Socialist Party's Foreign Language Federations, the Left Wing Section very apparently won a majority of the 15 seats on the party's governing National Executive Committee as well as balloting for International delegates and International Secretary in the 1919 election. Facing ceding party control to an aggressive Bolshevik National Executive Committee, the outgoing National executive Committee, guided by James Oneal and Executive Secretary Adolph Germer, declared that voting irregularities had rendered the result invalid.

Suspensions and expulsions of a major part of the SPA's membership immediately followed, beginning with the May 1919 suspensions of the Russian, Lithuanian, Polish, Latvian, South Slavic and Ukrainian Federations in addition to the entire state socialist parties of Michigan, Massachusetts and Ohio. In New York, the State Executive Committee suspended and "reorganized" Left Wing locals and branches representing nearly half the state's membership. By July 1919, the Socialist Party had purged itself through suspensions and expulsions of more than 60,000 of the nearly 110,000 members that it had touted in January of that year.

With Oneal and Germer's Party Regulars clearly in control of the situation, the suspended Foreign Language Federations and idiosyncratic Socialist Party of Michigan determined to move immediately to the formation of a Communist Party of America and issued a call for a founding convention to be held in Chicago on September 1, 1919. Others determined to fight on against the odds to restore the results of the 1919 party election at the scheduled August 30 convention of the Socialist Party. It was this latter group that would go on to establish the Communist Labor Party of America.

=== Establishment ===
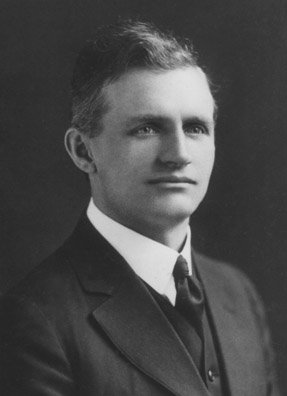
Executive Secretary Alfred Wagenknecht in 1918

Most of the English-speaking Left Wingers, headed by National Executive Committee members Alfred Wagenknecht and L. E. Katterfeld and including prominent New York journalist John Reed determined to fight on in an attempt to win control of the Socialist Party for the Left Wing. However, with many Left Wingers already abandoning this approach and the Regular faction firmly in control of a majority of the states electing delegates to the Emergency National Convention in Chicago scheduled for August 30, 1919, the fight was essentially over before it began.

The Credentials Committee of this convention was easily won by adherents of the Oneal-Germer Regulars, who froze out Left Wing-oriented delegations from California, Oregon and Minnesota. Roughly two dozen delegates pledging allegiance to the Left Wing Section bolted the convention to meet downstairs in a previously rented room, along with about 50 other Left Wingers from around the country. These latter delegates constituted themselves as the Communist Labor Party of America on August 31, 1919.

Executive Secretary of the Communist Labor Party of America was Alfred Wagenknecht of Ohio. The five-member National Executive Committee consisted of Max Bedacht, Alexander Bilan, L. E. Katterfeld, Jack Carney and Edward Lindgren. Initial headquarters were maintained in Cleveland before being moved to New York City in December 1919.

=== Underground period ===
The party moved to the underground in response to mass arrests and deportations conducted by the Justice Department and its Bureau of Investigation, guided by Special Assistant to the Attorney General J. Edgar Hoover. These raids and the move to the underground virtually destroyed the organization, which only existed in skeletal form in the first half of 1920, although publication of its legal newspaper, The Toiler, was maintained. The party also published an "illegal" underground monthly paper called Communist Labor Party News and issued the final issue of Ludwig Lore's theoretical magazine The Class Struggle under its auspices.

=== Dissolution through merger ===
On April 18, 1920, Executive Secretary C. E. Ruthenberg exited the Communist Party of America and along with his factional supporters (such as Jay Lovestone and Isaac Edward Ferguson) constituted themselves as the "real" Communist Party of America with a view to merger with the Communist Labor Party of America. This organizational marriage took place at a secret Joint Unity Convention held at Bridgman, Michigan in August 1922. The resulting organization, also organized along underground lines to avoid arrest, was known as the United Communist Party of America (UCPA).

The Communist International to which the UCPA and the CPA both pledged their allegiance sought to end duplication, competition and hostility between the two communist parties and insisted on a merger into a single organization. That was eventually brought about in May 1921 at a secret gathering held at the Overlook Mountain House hotel, near Woodstock, New York. The resulting unified group was also known as the Communist Party of America, which morphed into the Workers Party of America (December 1921) and changed its name in 1925 to Workers (Communist) Party and to Communist Party USA in 1929.

== Party press ==
During the party's brief life, five English-language periodicals were affiliated with it, with some inherited from organizations that had merged into the party and some new:

- The Toiler (Cleveland) – This paper was formerly the official publication of the Socialist Party of Ohio under the name The Ohio Socialist. The paper changed its name to The Toiler upon its establishment as the official party paper. Due to police pressure, the official publisher was changed to the Toiler Publishing Association late in 1919, thereby allowing the paper to continue as a "legal" publication under the pretext of independence.
- Voice of Labor (Chicago) – This was the serial began by John Reed and Ben Gitlow after they became disaffected with the majority of the National Left Wing Council. It continued as the labor organ of the CPA until it merged into the UCPA. It remained as a UCPA paper until it folded in July. It ran from Vol. I #1 August 15, 1919 to Vol. II #2 July 10, 1920.
- Communist Labor News (Cleveland) – One or two issues of a four-page broadsheet bearing this name were produced immediately after the party's formation, with content substantially similar to material also printed in the Ohio Socialist.
- Communist Labor (New York) – Six issues of this irregularly-issued tabloid newspaper were produced between December 6, 1919, and May 15, 1920 This was the "illegal" underground organ of the CLPA.
- The Class Struggle (New York) – The final issue of this theoretical journal, dated November 1919, bore the imprint of the CLPA on the cover. It was terminated for financial reasons.

== Publications ==
- Communist Labor Party News, Vol. 1, No. 1, (Dec. 6, 1919).
- James H. Dolsen, The Defense of a Revolutionist by Himself: Story of the Trial of James H. Dolsen, Who Defended Himself on the Charge of Criminal Syndicalism, Superior Court, Oakland, California, March 23-April 23, 1920. Oakland, CA: James H. Dolsen, 1920.
- Benjamin Gitlow, The "Red Ruby" Address to the Jury: Also, Darrow; the Judge Giovanitti. n.c. (New York): Communist Labor Party, n.d. (1920).
