= The History of the Standard Oil Company =

1904 book by Ida Tarbell

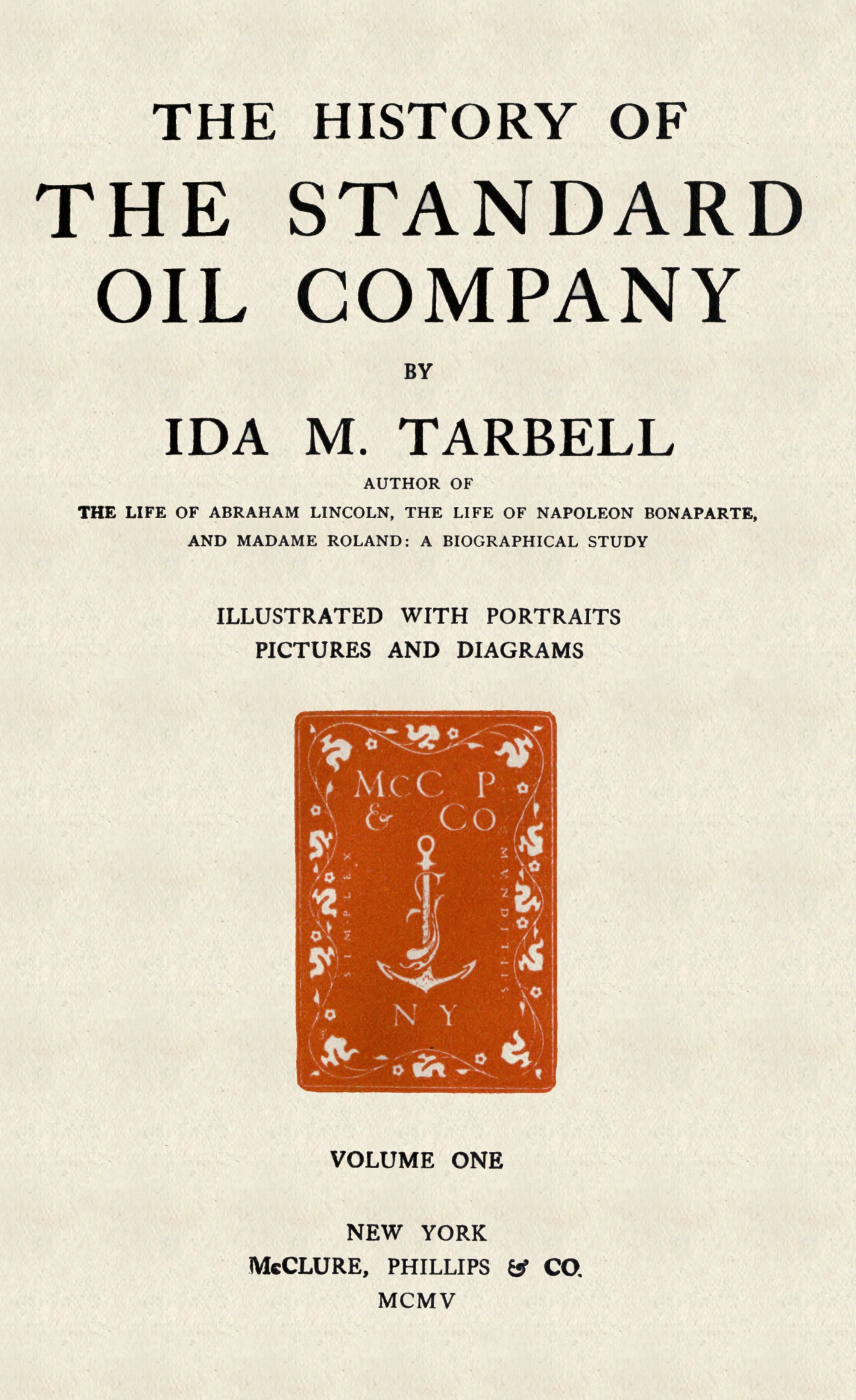
- Author: Ida M. Tarbell
- Language: English
- Subject: Standard Oil Company
- Published: 1904 McClure, Phillips and Co.
- Publication place: United States
- Media type: Print
- OCLC: 12591113
- LC Class: 04035331
- Text: The History of the Standard Oil Company at Wikisource

The History of the Standard Oil Company is a 1904 book by journalist Ida Tarbell. It is an exposé about the Standard Oil Company, run at the time by oil tycoon John D. Rockefeller, the richest figure in American history. Originally serialized in nineteen parts in McClure's magazine, the book is a seminal example of muckraking, and inspired many other journalists to write about trusts, large businesses that (in the absence of strong antitrust laws in the 19th century) attempted to gain monopolies in various industries.

The History of the Standard Oil Company is credited with hastening the breakup of Standard Oil, which came about in 1911, when the Supreme Court of the United States found the company to be violating the Sherman Antitrust Act. The subsequent decision splintered the company into 34 "baby Standards." The value of Rockefeller's shares rose after the breakup as the new companies had a positive development on the stock exchange.

The original book was a two-volume hardcover set. An abridged paperback edition was released later.

== Context ==
The inspiration behind The History of Standard Oil Company was largely fueled by Ida Tarbell's childhood experiences. Her father, Franklin Tarbell, worked for Standard Oil and lived through what Ida called "hate, suspicion, and fear that engulfed the community." As a direct witness to the schemes and horizontal integration of John D. Rockefeller and his associates, Tarbell began building the foundations of The History of the Standard Oil Company early with growing senses of interest and discontent.

After her education and to accumulate writing experience, Tarbell began working at McClure's Magazine, where she wrote several successful series on historical figures. After this initial success, her shift turned to John D. Rockefeller. She began by interviewing Henry H. Rogers, one of her father's fellow independents who became one of Rockefeller's colleagues, as well as others close to the inner workings of Standard Oil, that included one of the founders, Frank Barstow, as well. Eventually, Tarbell uncovered a crucial piece of evidence proving that Standard Oil was rigging railroad prices and preying on its competition.

== Reactions and legacy ==
Public outcry erupted at the conclusion of Tarbell's 19-part exposure of Standard Oil published in McClure's, eventually resulting in the expedited breakup of Standard Oil in 1911. Journalists, politicians, and citizens alike celebrated the accomplishments of Tarbell – a woman "outside" the inner workings of business and without significant money or influence. These reactions are immortalized in political cartoons utilizing imagery of Rockefeller's hidden agendas being demolished by investigative journalism and muckraking.

Several journal and newspaper reviewers addressed The History of Standard Oil Company by praising its calmness in the face of hatred, focus on facts, and genuine exposure of the effects that greed can have on businessmen seeking success. A 1904 editorial review from The New York Times relayed the highlights of the volumes to the public, noting the diplomatic tendencies of Tarbell within her work – still widely respectful of the achievements of John D. Rockefeller but critical of Standard Oil's business strategies that were unfair and of questionable legality. One review from the Economic Journal fixated on the monumental nature of Tarbell's work, stating that "it is difficult to write about Miss Tarbell's remarkable achievement without using language approaching the edge of hyperbole. So careful is she in her facts, so sane in her judgements, that she seems to have reached the high-water mark of industrial history."

Though Standard Oil Company accrued more cumulative value after it was broken up, the exposure of what Tarbell described as immoral and illegal business became a striking symbol of the power of the press. As such, The History of Standard Oil Company harbors great significance as a standard-bearer of modern investigative journalism.

In 1999 a jury under the aegis of the New York University's journalism department selected The History of the Standard Oil Company as the fifth best work of journalism in the United States in the 20th Century. In his 2008 book Taking on the Trust: The Epic Battle of Ida Tarbell and John D. Rockefeller, Steve Weinberg described the exposure of Standard Oil as "arguably the greatest work of investigative journalism ever written".
