= SKU (disambiguation) =

SKU is a common abbreviation for stock keeping unit.

SKU may also refer to:

== Places ==
- Skiu-Kaya, two adjoining villages in Ladakh, India
- Skyros Island National Airport (IATA: SKU), Greece

== Businesses and organizations ==
- SKU Amstetten, Austrian football club
- Sky Airline (ICAO: SKU), Santiago, Chile
- Sri Krishnadevaraya University, Andhra Pradesh, India
- Church of Sweden Youth (Swedish: Svenska Kyrkans Unga), the youth wing of the Church of Sweden
- Young Communist League of Sweden (disambiguation) (Swedish: Sveriges Kommunistiska Ungdomsförbund)
- Skadron Udara (SkU), an air squadron of the Indonesian Air Force

== See also ==
- Skus (disambiguation)
