= 1936 Communist National Convention =

- 1936 presidential election
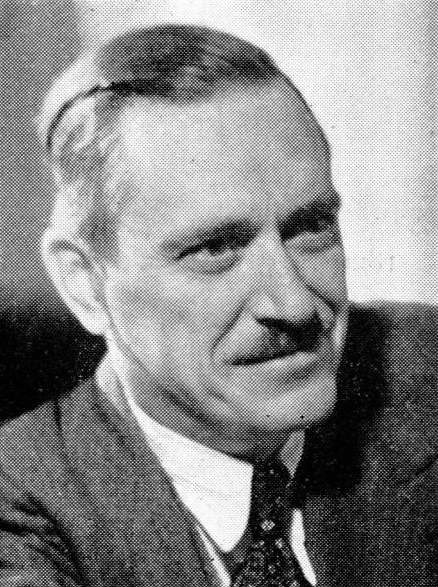
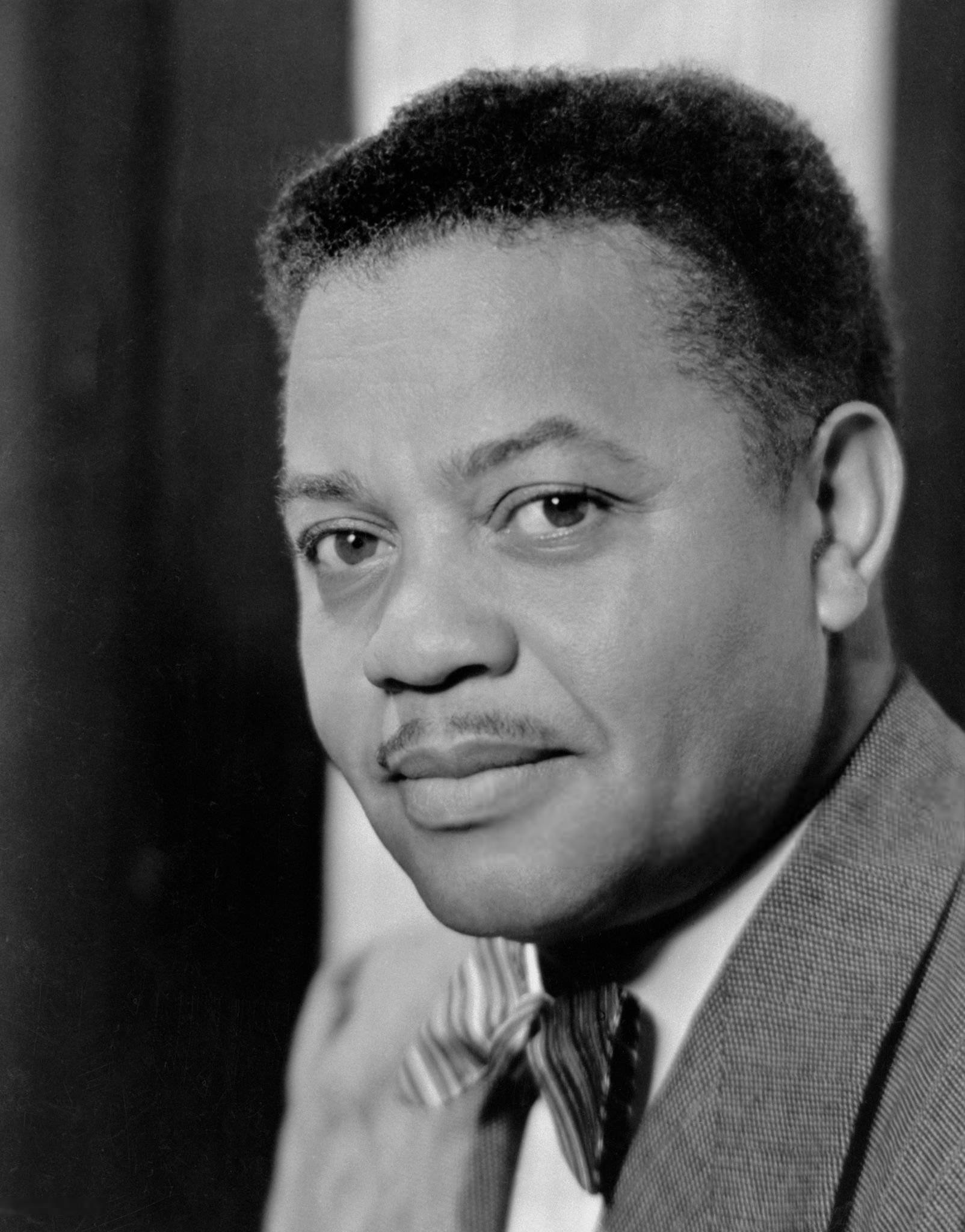
- Nominees (Browder and Ford)

Convention
- Dates: June 24–28, 1936
- City: Manhattan, New York City, New York
- Venue: Hammerstein Ballroom at the Manhattan Opera House (most proceedings); Madison Square Garden (closing session)

Candidates
- Presidential nominee: Earl Browder of Kansas
- Vice-presidential nominee: James W. Ford of New York

Voting
- Total delegates: 751
- Results (president): acclamation
- Results (vice president): acclamation

The 1936 Communist National Convention was held June 24–28, 1936 in New York City. It primarily took place at the Manhattan Opera House, with its final evening being held at Madison Square Garden. The convention saw Communist Party USA nominate Earl Browder for president and James W. Ford for vice president.

== Logistics ==
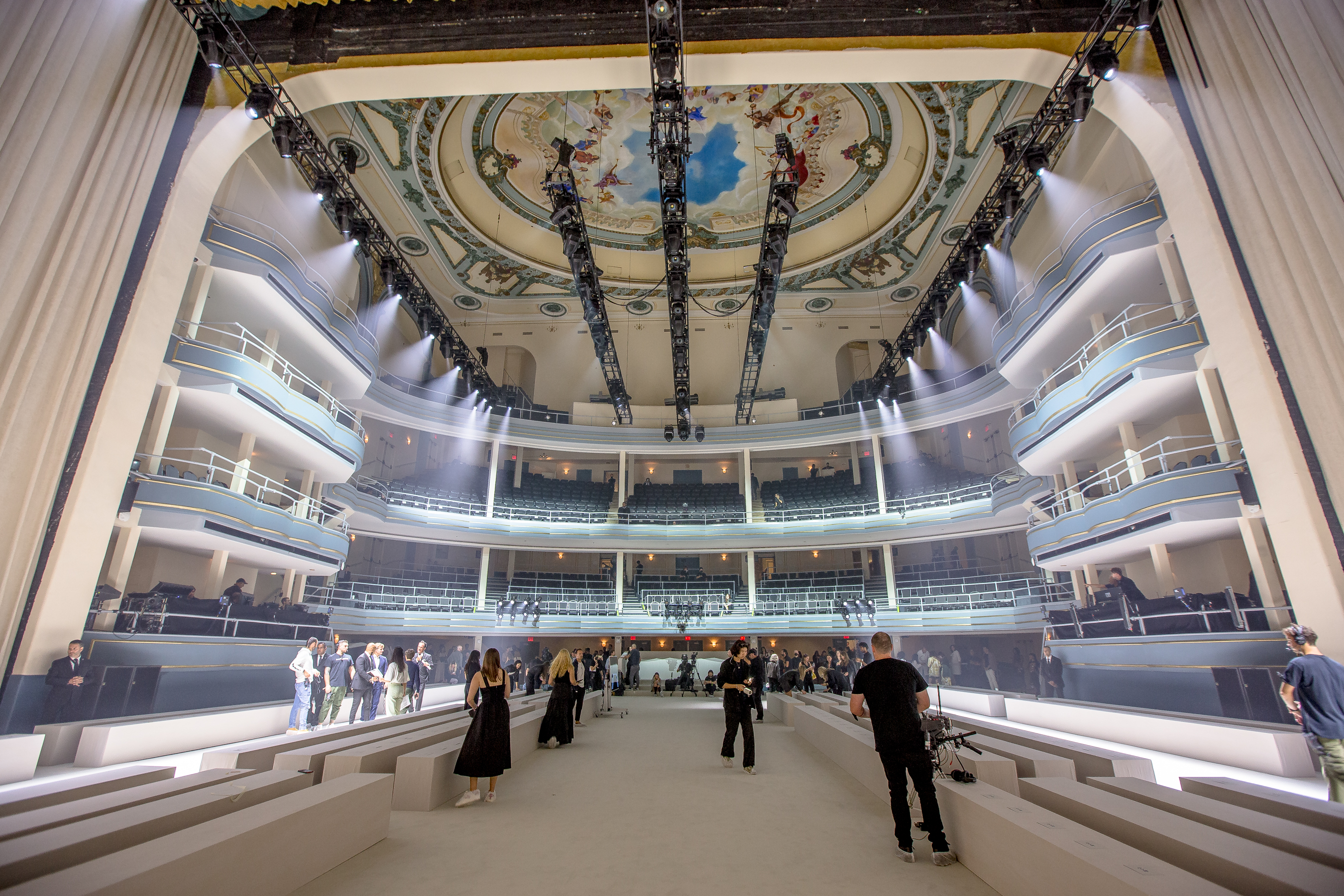
Hammerstein Ballroom (photographed in 2022), main venue of the convention

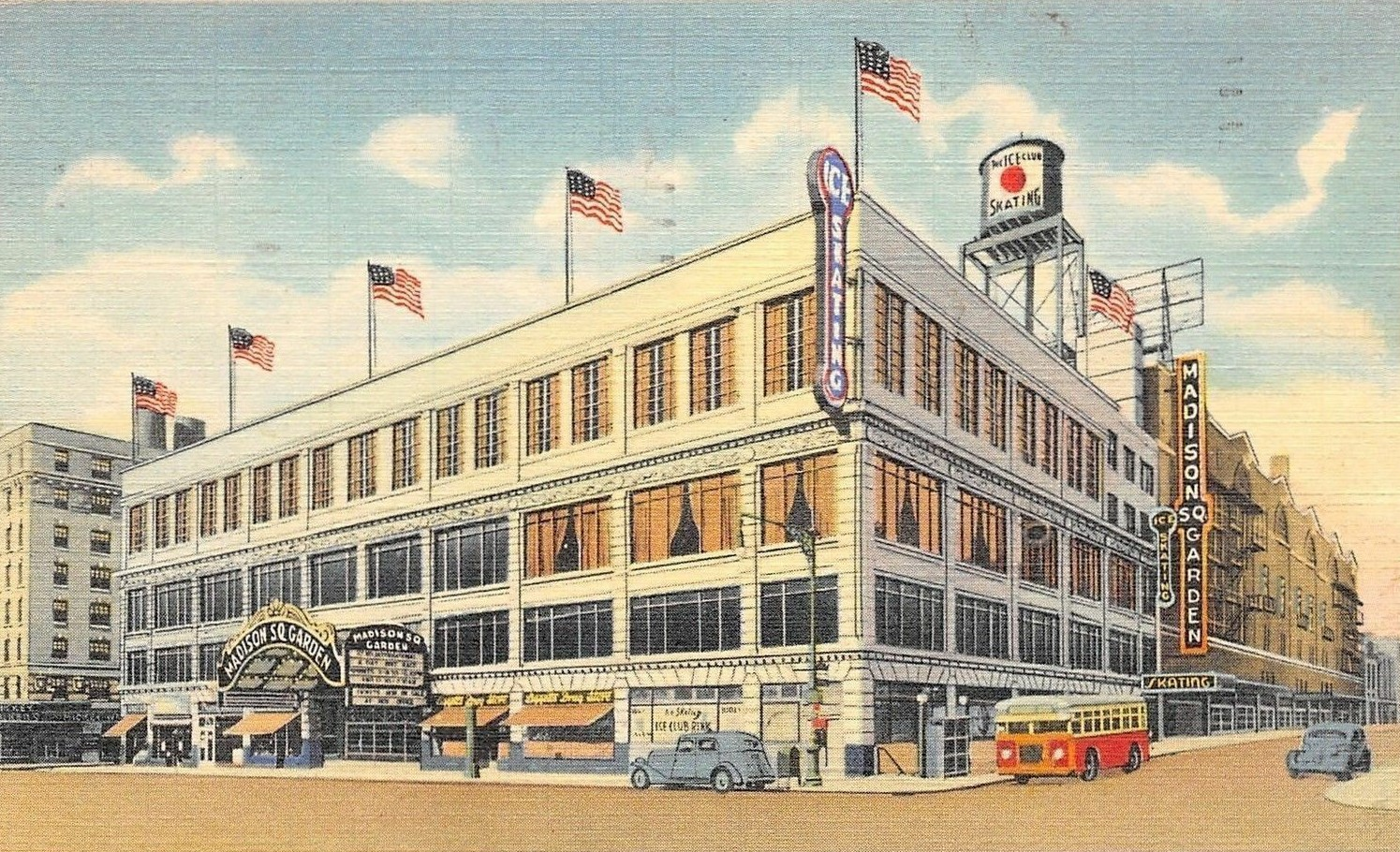
Madison Square Garden, venue of final evening

The convention was held in New York City, running for five days (June 24–28). It primarily was held in the Hammerstein Ballroom at the Manhattan Opera House, with all but its closing session being held there. Its final evening was held at Madison Square Garden.

The convention featured 751 delegates representing every U.S. state. The final evening attracted an crowd in excess of 25,000.

William Weinstone, the party's secretary, served as the convention's chairman.

== Nominations ==
The nomination occurred on the final evening of the convention, held at Madison Square Garden. It was preceded by addresses by Weinstone and by William Z. Foster (the party's three-time past presidential nominee).

Earl Browder's name was put forward for the presidential nomination by Robert Minor (the party's nominee in that year's election for governor of New York). In his nominating speech, Minor contrasted Browder against Alf Landon, that year's Republican presidential nominee. Minor noted that Browder had been born in the state of Kansas, from which Landon also hailed. He noted that the "resemblance ends there", exclaiming that while Landon was often dubbed "the Kansas Coolidge", Browder was instead "the new John Brown from Osawatomie".

After Minor's nominating address, delegates began parading around the hall, accompanied by nearly 1,000 members of the Young Communist League carrying the Flag of the Soviet Union. This demonstration of enthusiasm lasted for half an hour, closing with a crowd rendition of The Internationale.

Activist Ella Reeve Bloor put James W. Ford's name forward for the vice presidential nomination, which elicited a further display of enthusiasm from the crowd (especially from the African American delegates).

After the two names were put forward for the nominations, Chairman Weinstone inquired whether any further names were to be nominated for balloting, which was greeted by a loud response of "no" from the crowd. Thereafter, the two candidates were nominated by acclamation.

== Platform ==
The convention adopted an eight-point platform. The platform included a preamble attacking the policies put forward by the two major parties (Democratic and Republican), as well as the recently founded Union Party. The preamble included further language which advocated for progressive political forces in of the United States to unite around a common cause and form a Farmer-Labor political party that would stand to maintain American democratic principles and would stand to "defeat the growing forces of fascism and reaction."
