= Young Communists =

Young Communists can refer to:

- Young Communists (Catalonia)
- Young Communists (Czech Republic)
- Mouvement Jeunes Communistes de France
- Young Communists (Italy)
- Young Communists in Norway
- Young Communist League, the name of several organisations

== See also ==
- Communist Youth League (disambiguation)
- Category:Youth wings of communist parties
