= 1940 United States presidential election =

Second re-election of Franklin D. Roosevelt

- November 5, 1940

531 members of the Electoral College 266 electoral votes needed to win
- Turnout: 62.5% (▲1.5 pp)

Nominee	Franklin D. Roosevelt	Wendell Willkie
Party	Democratic	Republican
Home state	New York	New York
Running mate	Henry A. Wallace	Charles L. McNary
Electoral vote	449	82
States carried	38	10
Popular vote	27,313,945	22,347,744
Percentage	54.7%	44.8%
- Presidential election results map. Blue denotes those won by Roosevelt/Wallace, red denotes states won by Willkie/McNary. Numbers indicate the number of electoral votes allotted to each state.
President before election
Franklin D. Roosevelt
Democratic
Elected President
Franklin D. Roosevelt
Democratic

A presidential election was held in the United States on November 5, 1940. The Democratic ticket of incumbent President Franklin D. Roosevelt and Secretary of Agriculture Henry Wallace defeated the Republican ticket of businessman Wendell Willkie and senator Charles McNary, to be re-elected for an unprecedented third term in office. Until 1988, this was the last time in which the incumbent party won three consecutive presidential elections. It was also the fourth presidential election in which both major party candidates were registered in the same home state; the others have been in 1860, 1904, 1920, 1944, and 2016.

The election was contested in the shadow of World War II in Europe, as the United States was finally emerging from the Great Depression. Initially, Roosevelt was unwilling to campaign for a third presidential term, but was driven by worsening conditions in Europe. He and his allies sought to defuse challenges from other party leaders such as James Farley and Vice President John Nance Garner. The 1940 Democratic National Convention re-nominated Roosevelt on the first ballot, while Garner was replaced on the ticket by Secretary of Agriculture Henry A. Wallace. Willkie, a dark horse candidate, unexpectedly defeated conservative Senator Robert A. Taft and Manhattan District Attorney Thomas E. Dewey on the sixth presidential ballot of the 1940 Republican National Convention.

Roosevelt, acutely aware of strong isolationist and non-interventionist sentiment, promised there would be no involvement in foreign wars if he were reelected. Willkie, who had not previously run for public office, conducted an energetic campaign, managing to revive Republican strength in areas of the Midwest and Northeast. He criticized perceived incompetence and waste in the New Deal, warned of the dangers of breaking the two-term tradition, and accused Roosevelt of secretly planning to take the country into World War II. However, Willkie's association with big business damaged his cause, as many working class voters blamed corporations and business leaders for the Great Depression. Roosevelt led in all pre-election polls and won a comfortable victory; his margins, though still significant, were less decisive than they had been in 1932 and 1936.

== Nominations ==
=== Democratic Party ===
Democratic Party (United States) 1940 Democratic Party ticket
Franklin D. Roosevelt	Henry A. Wallace
for President	for Vice President
32nd President of the United States (1933–1945)	11th U.S. Secretary of Agriculture (1933–1940)
Campaign
3,250,555 votes 707.5 PD

In order of delegates and votes won
Franklin D. Roosevelt	John Nance Garner	Charles W. Sawyer	James Farley	William B. Bankhead	O. John Rogge	Millard Tydings	Burton K. Wheeler	Joseph C. O'Mahoney	Ellis E. Patterson	Cordell Hull	Paul V. McNutt
U.S. President from New York (1933–1945)	U.S. Vice President from Texas (1933–1941)	Lt. Governor of Ohio (1933–1935)	U.S. Postmaster General from New York (1933–1940)	U.S. House Speaker from Alabama (1936–1940)	U.S. Assistant Attorney General from New York (1939–1940)	U.S. Senator from Maryland (1927–1951)	U.S. Senator from Montana (1923–1947)	U.S. Senator from Wyoming (1934–1953)	Lt. Governor of California (1939–1943)	U.S. Secretary of State from Tennessee (1933–1944)	Administrator of the Federal Security Agency from Indiana (1934–1945)
3,214,555 votes 691.5 PD	426,641 votes 69.5 PD	283,952 votes 52 PD	76,919 votes 38.5 PD	196,508 votes 22 PD	20 PD	16 PD	8 PD	6 PD	48,337 votes	0 PD	0 PD

Convention vote
President		Vice President	
✓ Franklin D. Roosevelt	946	✓ Henry A. Wallace	626
James Farley	72	William B. Bankhead	329
John Nance Garner	61	Paul V. McNutt	68
Millard Tydings	9	Alva B. Adams	11
Cordell Hull	5	James Farley	7
		Jesse H. Jones	5
		Joseph C. O'Mahoney	3
		Alben W. Barkley	2
		Prentiss M. Brown	1
		Louis A. Johnson	1
		Scott W. Lucas	1
		Bascom N. Timmons	1
		David I. Walsh	0.5

Throughout the winter, spring, and summer of 1940, there was much speculation as to whether Roosevelt would break with longstanding tradition and run for an unprecedented third term. The two-term tradition, although not yet enshrined in the Constitution, had been established by George Washington when he refused to run for a third term in 1796; former president Ulysses S. Grant made an attempt to run for a third term in 1880, but failed to be nominated. President Roosevelt refused to state definitely whether he would run for a third term. He even indicated to some ambitious Democrats that he would not run. Two of them thus decided to seek the Democratic nomination. These were James Farley, his former campaign manager, and Vice President John Nance Garner. Garner was a Texas conservative who had come to disagree with Roosevelt's liberal economic and social policies, and declined to run for a third term as vice president.

However, as Nazi Germany swept through western Europe and menaced the United Kingdom in the summer of 1940, Roosevelt decided that only he had the necessary experience and skills to see the nation safely through the Nazi threat. He was aided by the party's political bosses, who feared that no Democrat except Roosevelt could defeat the popular Willkie.

At the July 1940 Democratic National Convention in Chicago, Roosevelt easily swept aside challenges from Farley and Garner. Roosevelt picked Secretary of Agriculture Henry A. Wallace of Iowa to replace Garner on the ticket. An outspoken liberal who had been a Republican until he joined Roosevelt's cabinet, he met strong opposition from conservatives and party traditionalists. Wallace was also known as "eccentric" in his private life: some years earlier, he had been a follower of Theosophist mystic Nicholas Roerich. But Roosevelt insisted that without Wallace he would not run. First Lady Eleanor Roosevelt came to Chicago to vouch for Wallace, delivering a speech to the convention. After this, Wallace won the vice-presidential nomination with 626 votes to 329 for House Speaker William B. Bankhead of Alabama.

=== Republican Party ===
Republican Party (United States) 1940 Republican Party ticket
Wendell Willkie	Charles L. McNary
for President	for Vice President
President of Commonwealth & Southern (1933–1940)	U.S. Senator from Oregon (1917–1918, 1918–1944)
Campaign

In order of delegates and votes won
Wendell Willkie	Robert A. Taft	Jerrold L. Seawell	Thomas E. Dewey	Arthur Vandenberg	Herbert Hoover	Hanford MacNider	Frank Gannett	Arthur H. James
Businessman from New York (1919–1939)	U.S. Senator from Ohio (1939–1953)	President pro tempore of California (1939–1941)	Manhattan District Attorney from New York (1938–1941)	U.S. Senator from Michigan (1928–1951)	Former U.S. President from California	Assistant Secretary of War(1925–1928)	Businessman from New York (1906–1957)	Governor of Pennsylvania (1939–1943)
21,140 votes 633 PD	516,428 votes 310 PD	538,112 votes 44 PD	1,605,754 votes 11 PD	100,651 votes	69 votes 9 PD	2 PD	1 PD	1 PD

Convention vote (6th Ballot before Shifts)
President		Vice President	
✓ Wendell L. Willkie	633	✓ Charles L. McNary	626
Robert A. Taft	310	Dewey Jackson Short	108
Thomas E. Dewey	11	Styles Bridges	2
Herbert Hoover	9		
Hanford MacNider	2		
Frank Gannett	1		
Arthur H. James	1		

In the months leading up to the opening of the 1940 Republican National Convention in Philadelphia, Pennsylvania, the Republican Party was deeply divided between the party's isolationists, who wanted to stay out of World War II at all costs, and the party's interventionists, who felt that the United Kingdom needed to be given all aid short of war to prevent Nazi Germany from conquering all of Europe. The three leading candidates for the Republican nomination - Senator Robert A. Taft from Ohio, Senator Arthur H. Vandenberg from Michigan, and District Attorney Thomas E. Dewey from New York - were all isolationists to varying degrees.

Taft was the leader of the conservative, isolationist wing of the Republican Party, and his main strength was in his native Midwestern United States and parts of the Southern United States. Dewey, the District Attorney for Manhattan, had risen to national fame as the "Gangbuster" prosecutor who had sent numerous infamous Mafia figures to prison, most notably Lucky Luciano, the organized-crime boss of New York City. Dewey had won most of the presidential primaries in the spring of 1940, and he came into the Republican Convention in June with the largest number of delegate votes, although he was still well below the number needed to win. Vandenberg, the senior Republican in the Senate, was the "favorite son" candidate of the Michigan delegation and was considered a possible compromise candidate if Taft or Dewey faltered. Former President Herbert Hoover was also spoken of as a compromise candidate.

However, each of these candidates had weaknesses that could be exploited. Taft's outspoken isolationism and opposition to any American involvement in the European war convinced many Republican leaders that he could not win a general election, particularly as France fell to the Nazis in June 1940 and Germany threatened the United Kingdom. Dewey's relative youth—he was only 38 in 1940—and lack of any foreign-policy experience caused his candidacy to weaken as the Wehrmacht emerged as a fearsome threat. In 1940, Vandenberg was also an isolationist (he would change his foreign-policy stance during World War II) and his lackadaisical, lethargic campaign never caught the voters' attention. Hoover still bore the stigma of having presided over the Wall Street Crash of 1929 and the subsequent Great Depression. This left an opening for a dark horse candidate to emerge.

Wendell Willkie for President campaign button.

A Wall Street-based industrialist named Wendell Willkie, who had never before run for public office, emerged as the unlikely nominee. Willkie, a native of Indiana and a former Democrat who had supported Franklin Roosevelt in the 1932 United States presidential election, was considered an improbable choice. Willkie had first come to public attention as an articulate critic of Roosevelt's attempt to break up electrical power monopolies.

Willkie was the CEO of the Commonwealth & Southern Corporation, which provided electrical power to customers in eleven states. In 1933, President Roosevelt had created the Tennessee Valley Authority (TVA), which promised to provide flood control and cheap electricity to the impoverished people of the Tennessee Valley. However, the government-run TVA would compete with Willkie's Commonwealth & Southern, and this led Willkie to criticize and oppose the TVA's attempt to compete with private power companies. Willkie argued that the government had unfair advantages over private corporations, and should thus avoid competing directly against them.

However, Willkie did not dismiss all of Roosevelt's social welfare programs, indeed supporting those he believed could not be managed any better by the free enterprise system. Furthermore, unlike the leading Republican candidates, Willkie was a forceful and outspoken advocate of aid to the Allies of World War II, especially the United Kingdom. His support of giving all aid to the British "short of declaring war" won him the support of many Republicans on the East Coast of the United States, who disagreed with their party's isolationist leaders in Congress.

Willkie's persuasive arguments impressed these Republicans, who believed that he would be an attractive presidential candidate. Many of the leading press barons of the era, such as Ogden Reid of the New York Herald Tribune, Roy Howard of the Scripps-Howard newspaper chain and John and Gardner Cowles Jr. publishers of the Minneapolis Star and the Minneapolis Tribune, as well as The Des Moines Register and Look magazine, supported Willkie in their newspapers and magazines. Even so, Willkie remained a long-shot candidate; the May 8 Gallup Poll showed Dewey at 67% support among Republicans, followed by Vandenberg and Taft, with Willkie at only 3%.

The German Army's rapid Blitzkrieg campaign into France in May 1940 shook American public opinion, even as Taft was telling a Kansas audience that America needed to concentrate on domestic issues to prevent Roosevelt from using the war crisis to extend socialism at home. Both Dewey and Vandenberg also continued to oppose any aid to the United Kingdom that might lead to war with Nazi Germany. Nevertheless, sympathy for the embattled British was mounting daily, and this aided Willkie's candidacy. By mid-June, little over one week before the Republican Convention opened, the Gallup poll reported that Willkie had moved into second place with 17%, and that Dewey was slipping. Fueled by his favorable media attention, Willkie's pro-British statements won over many of the delegates. As the delegates were arriving in Philadelphia, Gallup reported that Willkie had surged to 29%, Dewey had slipped five more points to 47%, and Taft, Vandenberg and Hoover trailed at 8%, 8%, and 6% respectively.

Hundreds of thousands, perhaps as many as one million, telegrams urging support for Willkie poured in, many from "Willkie Clubs" that had sprung up across the country. Millions more signed petitions circulating everywhere. At the 1940 Republican National Convention itself, keynote speaker Harold Stassen, the Governor of Minnesota, announced his support for Willkie and became his official floor manager. Hundreds of vocal Willkie supporters packed the upper galleries of the convention hall. Willkie's amateur status and fresh face appealed to delegates as well as voters. Most of the delegations were selected not by primaries, but by party leaders in each state, and they had a keen sense of the fast-changing pulse of public opinion. Gallup found the same thing in polling data not reported until after the convention: Willkie had moved ahead among Republican voters by 44% to only 29% for the collapsing Dewey. As the pro-Willkie galleries chanted "We Want Willkie!" the delegates on the convention floor began their vote. Dewey led on the first ballot, but steadily lost strength thereafter. Both Taft and Willkie gained in strength on each ballot, and by the fourth ballot it was obvious that either Willkie or Taft would be the nominee. The key moments came when the delegations of large states such as Michigan, Pennsylvania, and New York left Dewey and Vandenberg and switched to Willkie, giving him the victory on the sixth ballot.

Willkie's nomination was one of the most dramatic moments in any political convention. Having given little thought to whom he would select as his vice-presidential nominee, Willkie left the decision to convention chairman and Massachusetts Representative Joseph Martin, the House Minority Leader, who suggested Senate Minority Leader Charles L. McNary from Oregon. Despite the fact that McNary had spearheaded a "Stop Willkie" campaign late in the balloting, the convention picked him to be Willkie's running mate.

== General election ==
=== Polling ===
Polling aggregates
Candidates
Franklin Roosevelt
Wendell Willkie
Undecided

View source data.

Poll Source	Field Date(s)	Sample Size	Franklin Roosevelt Democratic	Wendell Willkie Republican	Others	Undecided	Leading by (points)
Election Results	November 5, 1940		54.7%	44.8%	0.5%	-	10.0
Gallup Poll News Service	November 2, 1940	3,094 (A)	51.1%	47.4%	0.4%	1.1%	3.7
Gallup Poll News Service	October 24, 1940	10,325 (A)	47.7%	44.2%	0.2%	7.9%	3.5
Gallup Poll News Service	October 23, 1940	3,161 (A)	48.2%	43.5%	0.3%	8.00%	4.7
Gallup Poll News Service	October 22, 1940	11,860 (A)	49.9%	41.8%	0.4%	7.9%	8.1
Gallup Poll News Service	October 19, 1940	5,525 (A)	48.3%	45.1%	0.5%	6.2%	3.2
Gallup Poll News Service	October 9, 1940	3,134 (A)	50.0%	41.4%	0.6%	7.9%	8.6
Gallup Poll News Service	October 5, 1940	6,221 (A)	46.7%	45.6%	0.4%	7.5%	1.1
Gallup Poll News Service	September 30, 1940	3,089 (A)	48.8%	42.0%	0.3%	8.8%	6.8
Gallup Poll News Service	September 20, 1940	2,957 (A)	48.3%	40.7%	0.1%	11.0%	7.6
Gallup Poll News Service	September 14, 1940	7,489 (A)	47.6%	42.4%	0.5%	9.5%	5.2
Gallup Poll News Service	September 3, 1940	4,536 (A)	42.7%	42.8%	0.3%	14.2%	0.2
Gallup Poll News Service	August 21, 1940	3,117 (A)	43.2%	43.6%	0.3%	12.2%	0.4
Gallup Poll News Service	August 9, 1940	3,117 (A)	40.3%	43.8%	0.6%	13.8%	3.5
Gallup Poll News Service	August 8, 1940	5,790 (A)	42.1%	46.0%	0.9%	11.1%	3.9
Gallup Poll News Service	July 31, 1940	3,060 (A)	43.6%	45.8%	0.3%	10.3%	2.2
Gallup Poll News Service	July 19, 1940	3,117 (A)	42.7%	43.4%	0.5%	13.4%	0.7
Gallup Poll News Service	July 16, 1940	1,626 (A)	44.3%	43.1%	0.3%	12.4%	1.2
Gallup Poll News Service	July 11, 1940	2,490 (A)	46.4%	39.8%	-	13.8%	6.6
Gallup Poll News Service	July 3, 1940	3,121 (A)	42.0%	45.7%	-	12.3%	3.6
Gallup Poll News Service	Jun 11, 1940	3,091 (A)	52.7%	29.9%	-	17.3%	22.9
Gallup Poll News Service	May 29, 1940	3,159 (A)	54.5%	29.3%	-	15.9%	25.2

The Gallup Poll accurately predicted the election outcome. However, the American Institute of Public Opinion, responsible for the Gallup Poll, avoided predicting the outcome, citing a four percent margin of error. The Gallup Poll also found that, if there was no war in Europe, voters preferred Willkie over Roosevelt.

=== Fall campaign ===
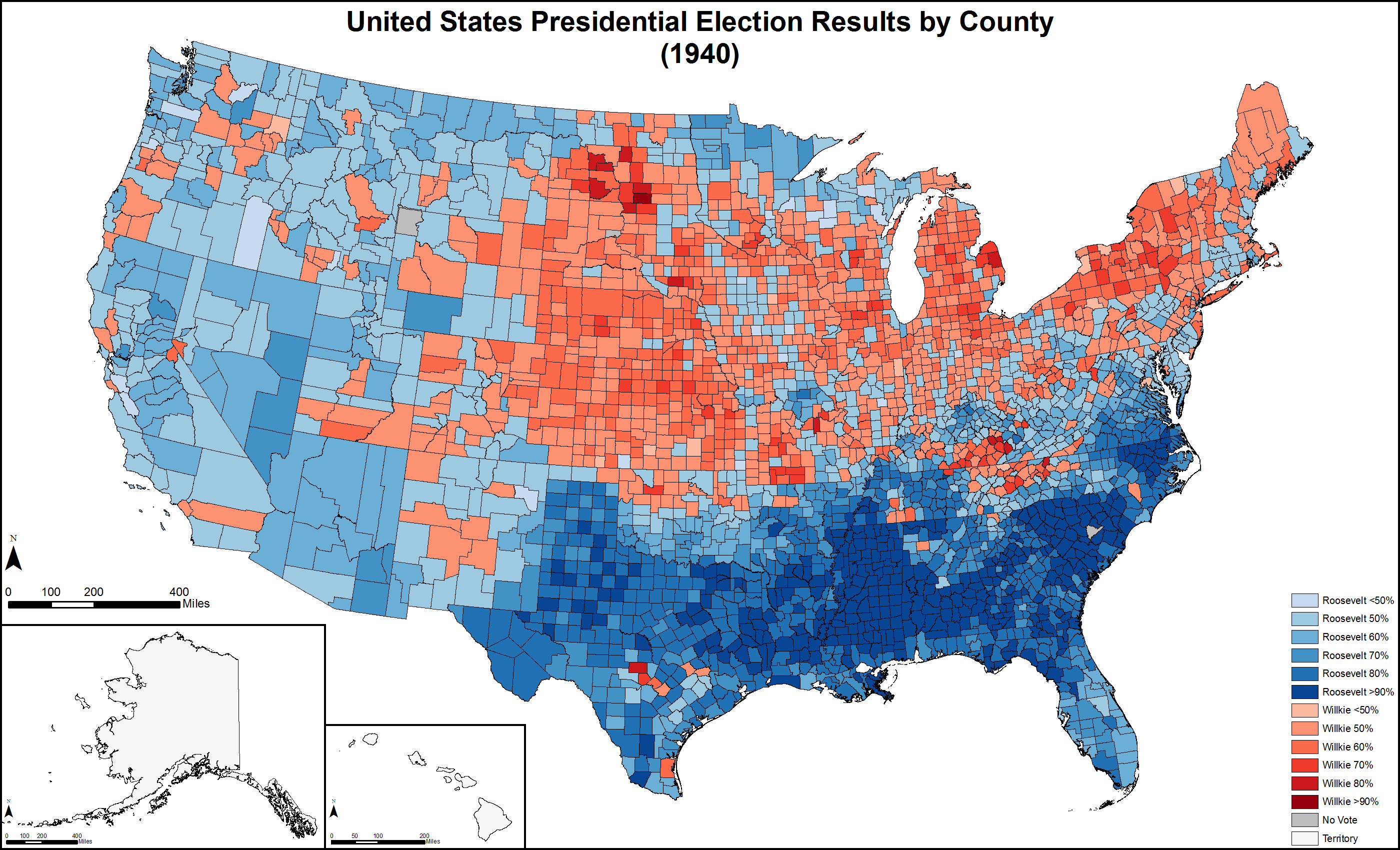
Results by county explicitly indicating the percentage for the winning candidate. Shades of blue are for Roosevelt (Democratic) and shades of red are for Willkie (Republican).

Willkie crusaded against Roosevelt's attempt to break the two-term presidential tradition, arguing that "if one man is indispensable, then none of us is free." Even some Democrats who had supported Roosevelt in the past disapproved of his attempt to win a third term, and Willkie hoped to win their votes. Willkie also criticized what he claimed was the incompetence and waste in Roosevelt's New Deal welfare programs. He stated that as president he would keep most of Roosevelt's government programs, but would make them more efficient.

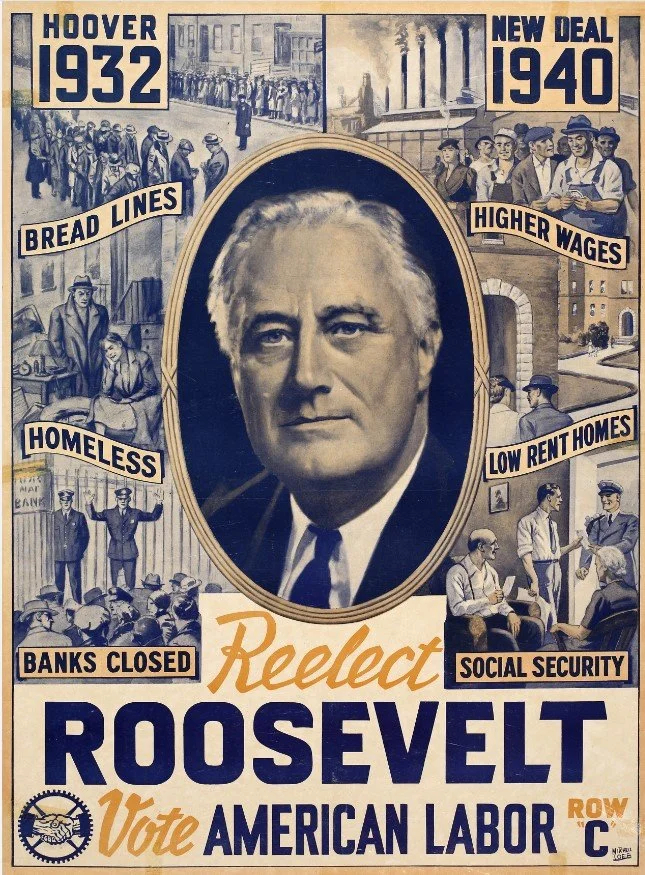
An American Labor Party campaign poster urging voters to reelect Franklin D. Roosevelt, contrasting his record with that of Herbert Hoover.

However, many Americans still blamed business leaders for the Great Depression, and the fact that Willkie symbolized "Big Business" hurt him with many working-class voters. Willkie was a fearless campaigner; he often visited industrial areas where Republicans were still blamed for causing the Great Depression and where Roosevelt was highly popular. In these areas, Willkie frequently had rotten fruit and vegetables thrown at him and was heckled by crowds; still, he was unfazed.

Henry Wallace, Roosevelt’s nominee for vice-president, attacked perceived isolationist tendencies in the opposing party during the campaign, and accused them of being supporters of a policy of appeasement towards Nazi Germany. Shortly before the election, Wallace was quoted by the United Press:

“Millions of Americans know from personal observation that there is Nazi propaganda and Nazi pressure, for the election of the Republican candidate for the presidency,” Wallace said. “He (Hitler) has decided that if Roosevelt can be defeated, England would be discouraged, South America turn away from the United States, and he would have an easier time with his somewhat delayed plans for world conquest.”

Willkie accused Roosevelt of leaving the nation unprepared for war, but Democrats contended Roosevelt's military buildup and transformation of the nation into the "Arsenal of Democracy" removed the "unpreparedness" charge as a major issue. Willkie then reversed his approach and charged Roosevelt with secretly planning to take the nation into World War II. This accusation did cut into Roosevelt's support. In response, Roosevelt, in a pledge that he would later regret, promised that he would "not send American boys into any foreign wars." The United Kingdom and Germany actively interfered throughout the election, hoping to exploit public sentiments and cultivate political contacts.

=== Results ===
Roosevelt led in all pre-election opinion polls by various margins. On Election Day—November 5, 1940, he received 27.3 million votes to Willkie's 22.3 million, and in the Electoral College, he defeated Willkie by a margin of 449 to 82. Willkie did get over six million more votes than the Republican nominee in 1936, Alf Landon, and he ran strong in rural areas in the American Midwest, taking over 57% of the farm vote. Many counties in the Midwest have not voted for a Democrat since. Roosevelt, meanwhile, carried every American city with a population of more than 400,000 except Cincinnati, Ohio. Of the 106 cities with more than 100,000 population, he won 61% of the votes cast; in the Southern United States as a whole, he won 73% of the total vote. In the remainder of the country (the rural and small-town Northern United States), Willkie had a majority of 53%. In the cities, there was a class differential, with the white-collar and middle-class voters supporting the Republican candidate, and working class, blue-collar voters going for FDR. In the North, Roosevelt won 87% of the Jewish vote, 73% of the Catholics, and 61% of the nonmembers, while all the major Protestant denominations showed majorities for Willkie.

Roosevelt's net vote totals in the twelve largest cities decreased from 3,479,000 votes in the 1936 election to 2,112,000 votes, but it was still higher than his result from the 1932 election when he won by 1,791,000 votes. Of the 3,094 counties/independent cities, Roosevelt won in 1,947 (62.93%) while Willkie carried 1,147 (37.07%).

=== Records ===
Roosevelt was the third of just four presidents in United States history to win re-election with a lower percentage of the electoral vote than in their prior elections, the other three were James Madison in 1812, Woodrow Wilson in 1916 and Barack Obama in 2012. Additionally, Roosevelt was the fourth of only five presidents to win re-election with a smaller percentage of the popular vote than in prior elections, the other four are Madison in 1812, Andrew Jackson in 1832, Grover Cleveland in 1892, and Obama in 2012. This marked the first time since 1892 that the Democrats won the popular vote in three consecutive elections, and the first since 1836 where they won three consecutive elections. Although at a rate lower than 1936, Roosevelt maintained his strong majorities from labor unions, big city political machines, ethnic minority voters, and the traditionally Democratic Solid South. Roosevelt's third consecutive victory inspired the Twenty-second Amendment, limiting the number of terms a person may be president.

As of 2024, Roosevelt was the sixth of eight presidential nominees to win a significant number of electoral votes in at least three elections, the others being Thomas Jefferson, Henry Clay, Andrew Jackson, Grover Cleveland, William Jennings Bryan, Richard Nixon, and Donald Trump. Of these, Jackson, Cleveland, and Roosevelt also won the popular vote in at least three elections. Jefferson, Cleveland, Roosevelt, and Trump were also their respective party's nominees for three consecutive elections.

This was the first time in which North Dakota voted for a losing candidate and the first time since 1892 in which a Democrat won without Colorado, Kansas, and Nebraska. This was also the first time anyone won without Colorado and Nebraska since 1908, and Kansas since 1900. It was also the fourth presidential election in which both major party candidates were registered in the same home state; the others have been in 1860, 1904, 1920, 1944, and 2016.

Willkie and McNary both died in 1944 (October 8 and February 25, respectively), which is the first, and to date only time both members of a major-party presidential ticket died during the term for which they sought election. Had they been elected, Willkie's death would have resulted in the Secretary of State becoming acting president for the remainder of the term ending on January 20, 1945, in accordance with the Presidential Succession Act of 1886.

The eleven states of the former Confederacy provided 4.53% of Willkie's votes, with him taking 21.65% of the vote in that region.

Electoral results
Presidential candidate	Party	Home state	Popular vote		Electoral vote	Running mate		
Presidential candidate	Party	Home state	Count	Percentage	Electoral vote	Vice-presidential candidate	Home state	Electoral vote
Franklin D. Roosevelt (incumbent)	Democratic	New York	27,313,945	54.74%	449	Henry A. Wallace	Iowa	449
Wendell Willkie	Republican	New York	22,347,744	44.78%	82	Charles L. McNary	Oregon	82
Norman Thomas	Socialist	New York	116,599	0.23%	0	Maynard C. Krueger	Illinois	0
Roger Babson	Prohibition	Massachusetts	57,903	0.12%	0	Edgar Moorman	Illinois	0
Earl Browder	Communist	Kansas	48,557	0.10%	0	James W. Ford	New York	0
John W. Aiken	Socialist Labor	Connecticut	14,883	0.03%	0	Aaron M. Orange	New York	0
Other			2,482	0.00%	—	Other		—
Total			49,902,113	100%	531			531
Needed to win					266			266

Source (Popular Vote): Leip, David. "1940 Presidential Election Results". Dave Leip's Atlas of U.S. Presidential Elections.Source (Electoral Vote): "Electoral College Box Scores 1789–1996". National Archives and Records Administration.

Popular vote
Roosevelt	54.74%
Willkie	44.78%
Thomas	0.23%
Others	0.25%

Electoral vote
Roosevelt	84.56%
Willkie	15.44%

=== Geography of results ===
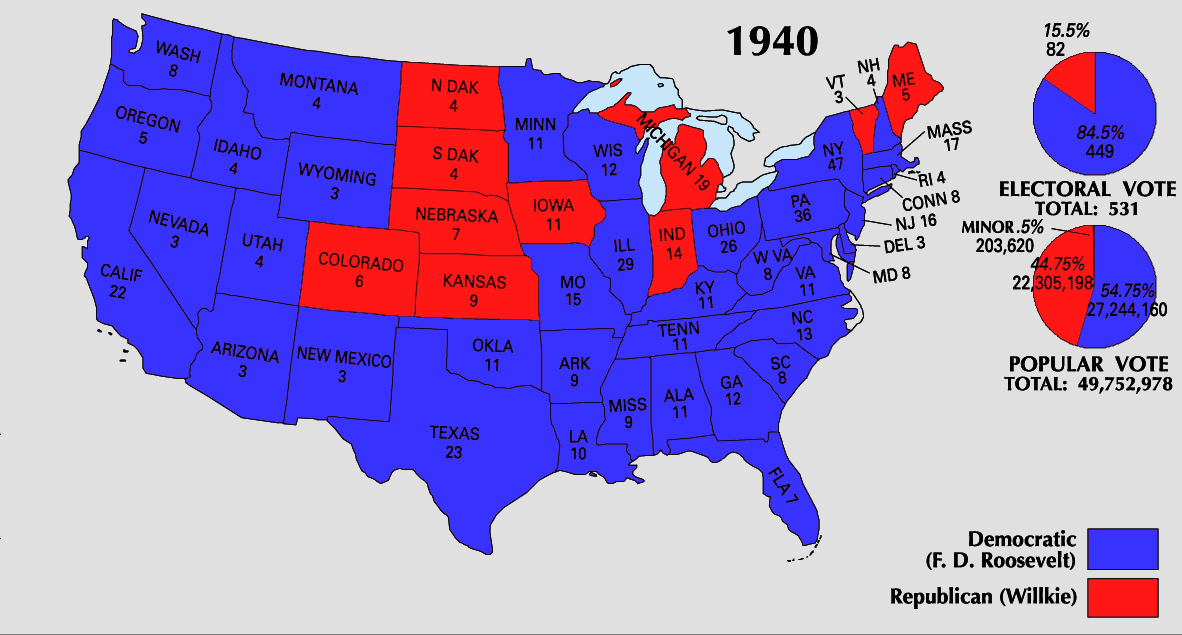

Results by county, shaded according to winning candidate's percentage of the vote

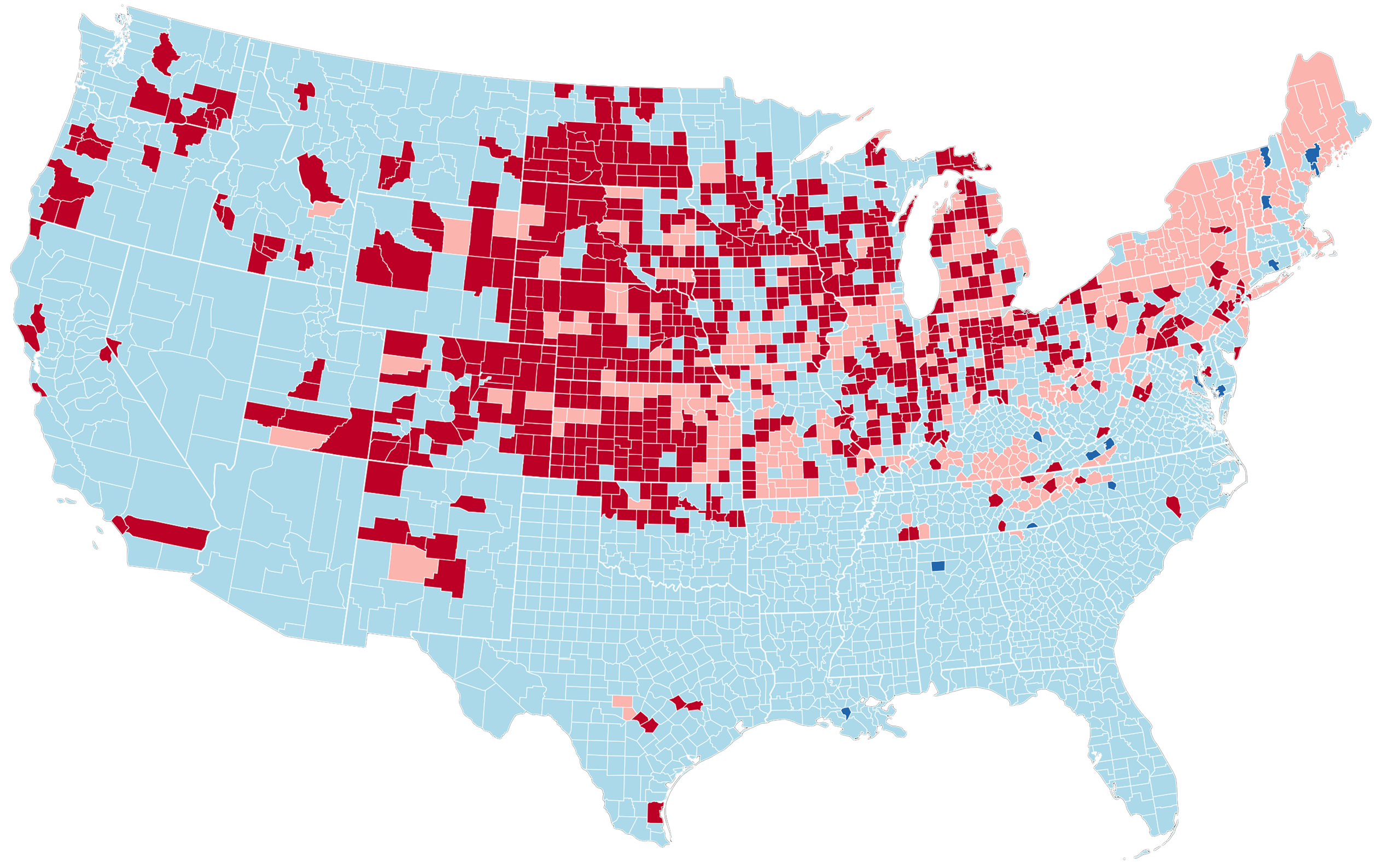
1936-40 county flips, light red indicates GOP hold, dark red indicates GOP flip, light blue indicates Dem hold, and dark blue indicates Dem flip.

==== Cartographic gallery ====
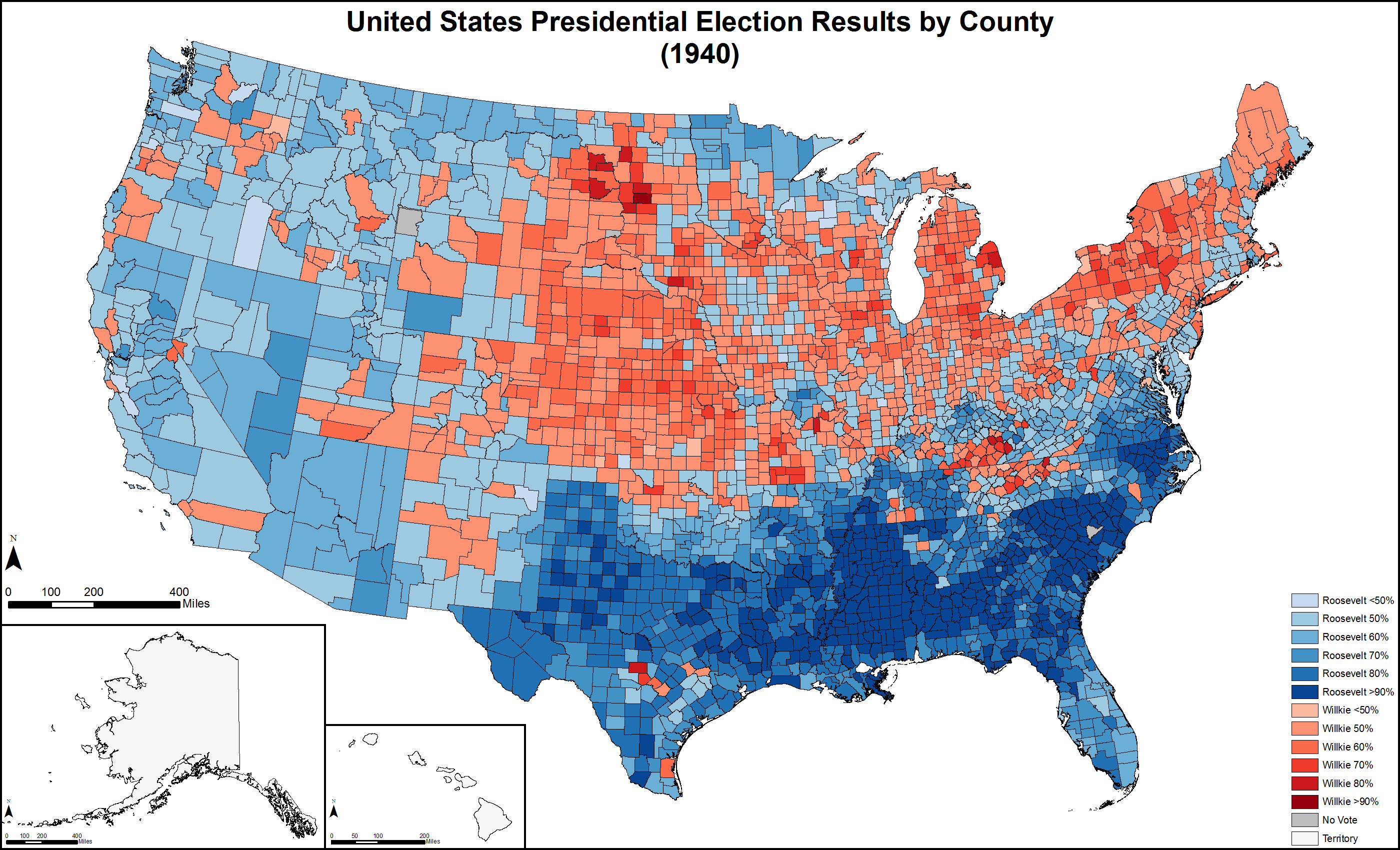
Presidential election results by county

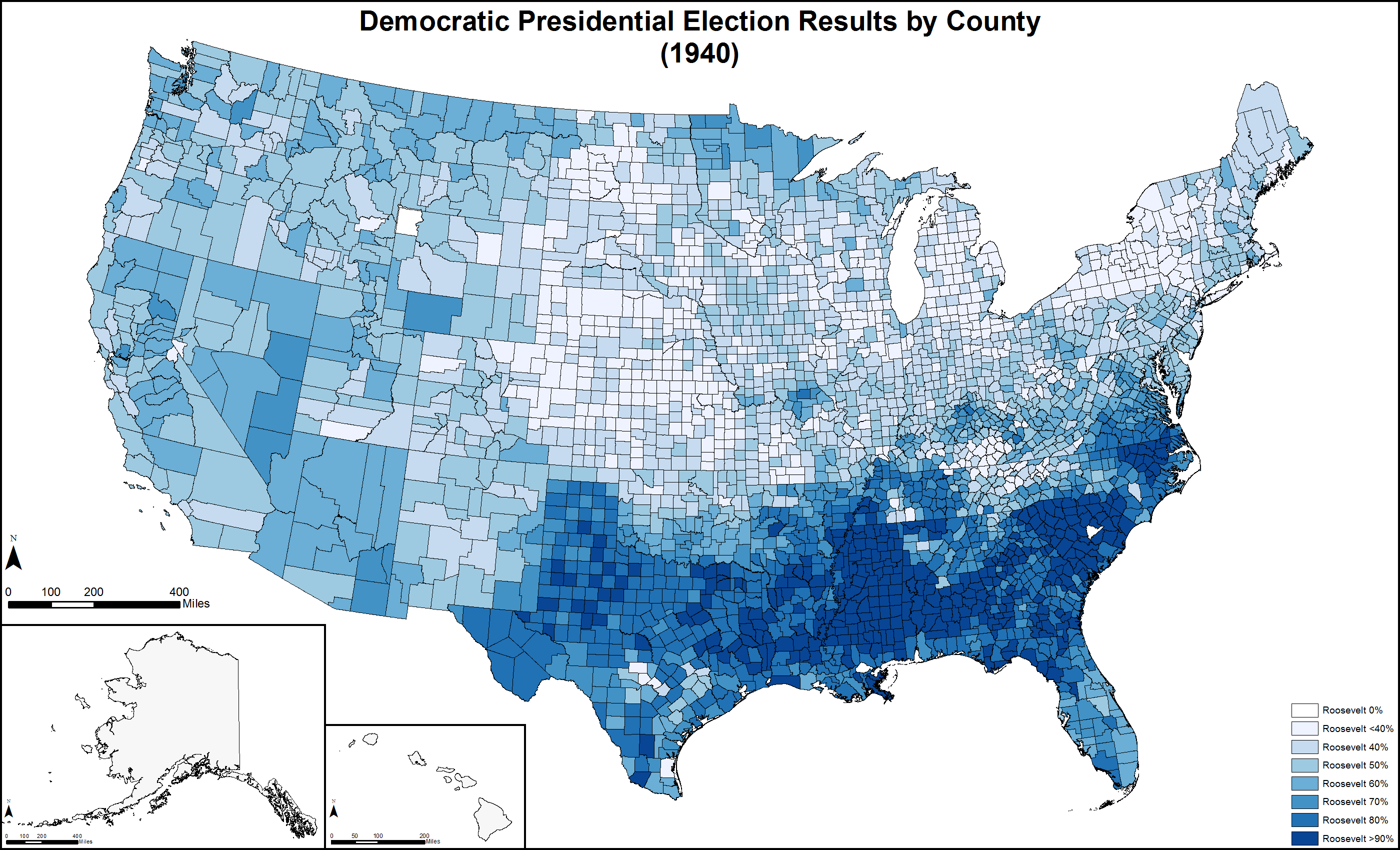
Democratic presidential election results by county

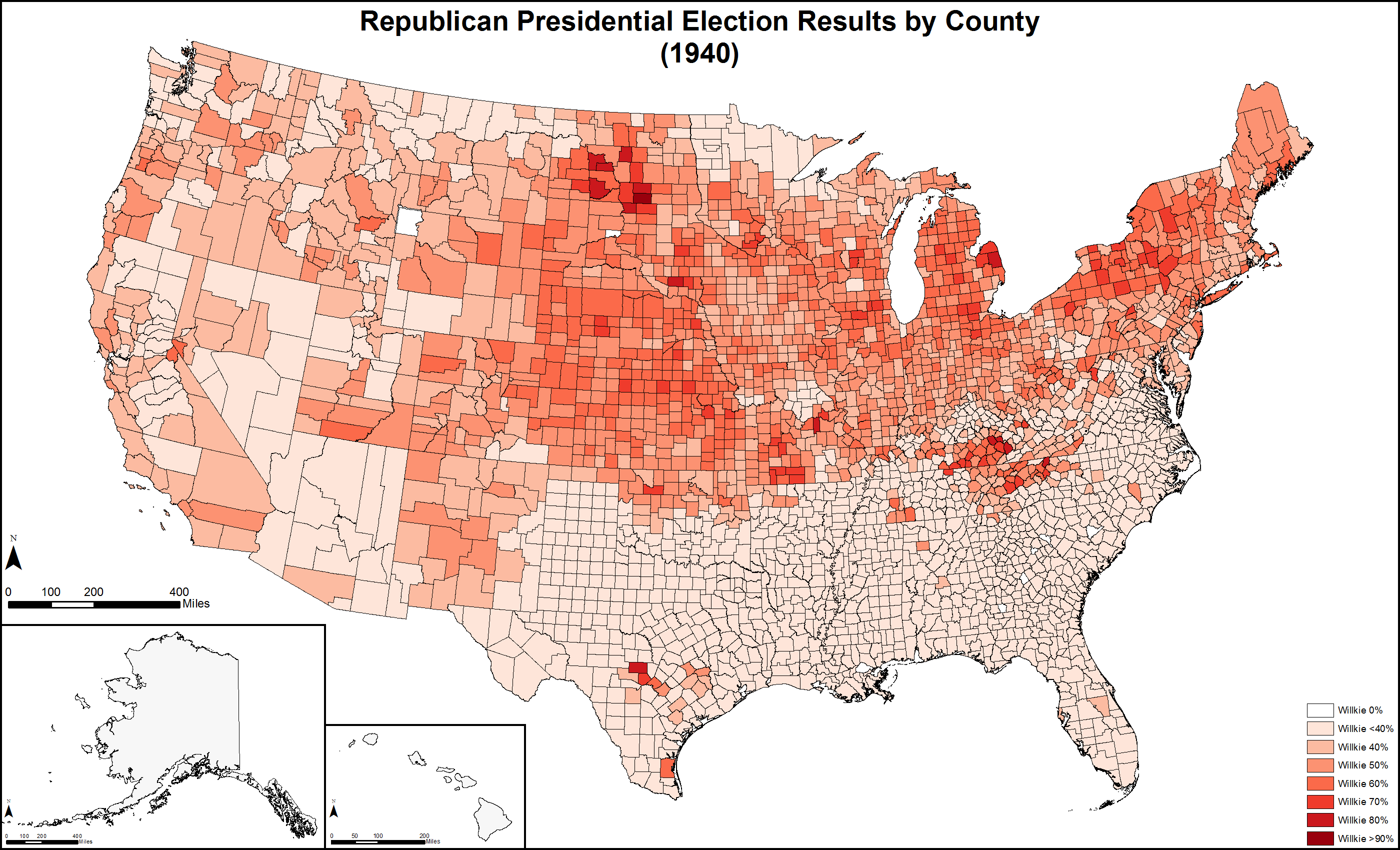
Republican presidential election results by county

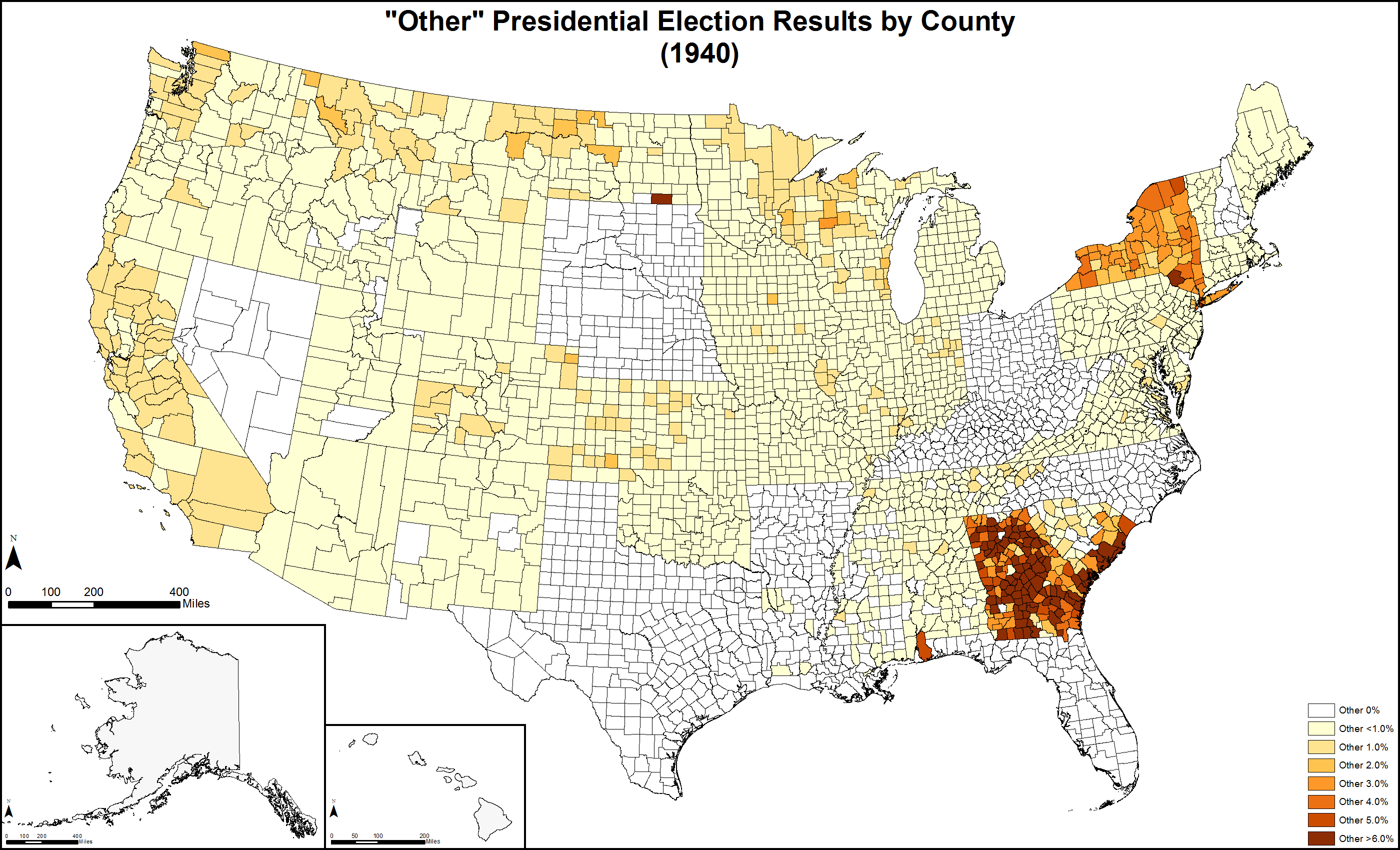
"Other" presidential election results by county

State Level Performance for Norman Thomas' Presidential Campaign, 1940 (Socialist Party)

=== Results by state ===
States/districts won by Roosevelt/Wallace
States/districts won by Willkie/McNary

		Franklin D. Roosevelt Democratic			Wendell Willkie Republican			Norman Thomas Socialist			Other			Margin		Margin Swing (Note: Percentage point difference in margin from the 1936 election)	State Total	
State	electoral votes	#	%	electoral votes	#	%	electoral votes	#	%	electoral votes	#	%	electoral votes	#	%	%	#	
Alabama	11	250,726	85.22	11	42,184	14.34	-	100	0.03	-	1,209	0.41	-	208,542	70.88	-2.68	294,219	AL
Arizona	3	95,267	63.49	3	54,030	36.01	-	-	-	-	742	0.49	-	41,237	27.48	-15.44	150,039	AZ
Arkansas	9	158,622	79.02	9	42,121	20.98	-	-	-	-	-	-	-	116,501	58.03	-6.51	200,743	AR
California	22	1,877,618	57.44	22	1,351,419	41.34	-	16,506	0.50	-	23,248	0.71	-	526,199	16.10	-19.16	3,268,791	CA
Colorado	6	265,554	48.37	-	279,576	50.92	6	1,899	0.35	-	1,975	0.36	-	-14,022	-2.55	-25.83	549,004	CO
Connecticut	8	417,621	53.44	8	361,819	46.30	-	-	-	-	2,062	0.26	-	55,802	7.14	-7.83	781,502	CT
Delaware	3	74,599	54.70	3	61,440	45.05	-	115	0.08	-	220	0.16	-	13,159	9.65	-0.12	136,374	DE
Florida	7	359,334	74.01	7	126,158	25.99	-	-	-	-	-	-	-	233,176	48.03	-4.17	485,492	FL
Georgia	12	265,194	84.85	12	46,360	14.83	-	-	-	-	997	0.32	-	218,834	70.02	-4.56	312,551	GA
Idaho	4	127,842	54.36	4	106,553	45.31	-	497	0.21	-	276	0.12	-	21,289	9.05	-20.72	235,168	ID
Illinois	29	2,149,934	50.97	29	2,047,240	48.54	-	10,914	0.26	-	9,847	0.23	-	102,694	2.43	-15.58	4,217,935	IL
Indiana	14	874,063	49.03	-	899,466	50.45	14	2,075	0.12	-	7,143	0.40	-	-25,403	-1.42	-16.16	1,782,747	IN
Iowa	11	578,800	47.62	-	632,370	52.03	11	-	-	-	4,260	0.35	-	-53,570	-4.41	-16.12	1,215,430	IA
Kansas	9	364,725	42.40	-	489,169	56.86	9	2,347	0.27	-	4,056	0.47	-	-124,444	-14.47	-22.19	860,297	KS
Kentucky	11	557,222	57.44	11	410,384	42.30	-	1,014	0.10	-	1,443	0.15	-	146,838	15.14	-3.45	970,063	KY
Louisiana	10	319,751	85.88	10	52,446	14.09	-	-	-	-	108	0.03	-	267,305	71.80	-5.87	372,305	LA
Maine	5	156,478	48.77	-	163,951	51.10	5	-	-	-	411	0.13	-	-7,473	-2.33	11.64	320,840	ME
Maryland	8	384,546	58.25	8	269,534	40.83	-	4,093	0.62	-	1,944	0.29	-	115,012	17.42	-7.89	660,117	MD
Massachusetts	17	1,076,522	53.11	17	939,700	46.36	-	4,091	0.20	-	6,680	0.33	-	136,822	6.75	-2.71	2,026,993	MA
Michigan	19	1,032,991	49.52	-	1,039,917	49.85	19	7,593	0.36	-	5,428	0.26	-	-6,926	-0.33	-17.89	2,085,929	MI
Minnesota	11	644,196	51.49	11	596,274	47.66	-	5,454	0.44	-	5,264	0.42	-	47,922	3.83	-27.00	1,251,188	MN
Mississippi	9	168,267	95.70	9	7,364	4.19	-	193	0.11	-	-	-	-	160,903	91.51	-2.97	175,824	MS
Missouri	15	958,476	52.27	15	871,009	47.50	-	2,226	0.12	-	2,018	0.11	-	87,467	4.77	-17.82	1,833,729	MO
Montana	4	145,698	58.78	4	99,579	40.17	-	1,443	0.58	-	1,153	0.47	-	46,119	18.61	-23.46	247,873	MT
Nebraska	7	263,677	42.81	-	352,201	57.19	7	-	-	-	-	-	-	-88,524	-14.37	-30.77	615,878	NE
Nevada	3	31,945	60.08	3	21,229	39.92	-	-	-	-	-	-	-	10,716	20.15	-25.77	53,174	NV
New Hampshire	4	125,292	53.22	4	110,127	46.78	-	-	-	-	-	-	-	15,165	6.44	4.69	235,419	NH
New Jersey	16	1,016,404	51.48	16	944,876	47.86	-	2,823	0.14	-	10,111	0.51	-	71,528	3.62	-16.40	1,974,214	NJ
New Mexico	3	103,699	56.59	3	79,315	43.28	-	144	0.08	-	100	0.05	-	24,384	13.31	-12.89	183,258	NM
New York	47	3,251,918	51.60	47	3,027,478	48.04	-	18,950	0.30	-	3,250	0.05	-	224,440	3.56	-16.33	6,301,596	NY
North Carolina	13	609,015	74.03	13	213,633	25.97	-	-	-	-	-	-	-	395,382	48.06	1.26	822,648	NC
North Dakota	4	124,036	44.18	-	154,590	55.06	4	1,279	0.46	-	870	0.31	-	-30,554	-10.88	-43.91	280,775	ND
Ohio	26	1,733,139	52.20	26	1,586,773	47.80	-	-	-	-	-	-	-	146,366	4.41	-16.15	3,319,912	OH
Oklahoma	11	474,313	57.41	11	348,872	42.23	-	-	-	-	3,027	0.37	-	125,441	15.18	-18.96	826,212	OK
Oregon	5	258,415	53.70	5	219,555	45.62	-	398	0.08	-	2,872	0.60	-	38,860	8.07	-26.78	481,240	OR
Pennsylvania	36	2,171,035	53.23	36	1,889,848	46.33	-	10,967	0.27	-	6,864	0.17	-	281,187	6.89	-8.91	4,078,714	PA
Rhode Island	4	182,182	56.73	4	138,653	43.17	-	-	-	-	313	0.10	-	43,529	13.55	0.64	321,148	RI
South Carolina	8	95,470	95.63	8	4,360	4.37	-	-	-	-	2	0.00	-	91,110	91.26	-5.88	99,832	SC
South Dakota	4	131,362	42.59	-	177,065	57.41	4	-	-	-	-	-	-	-45,703	-14.82	-26.34	308,427	SD
Tennessee	11	351,601	67.25	11	169,153	32.35	-	463	0.09	-	1,606	0.31	-	182,448	34.90	-3.04	522,823	TN
Texas	23	909,974	80.92	23	212,692	18.91	-	728	0.06	-	1,137	0.10	-	697,282	62.01	-12.78	1,124,531	TX
Utah	4	154,277	62.25	4	93,151	37.59	-	200	0.08	-	191	0.08	-	61,126	24.67	-14.88	247,819	UT
Vermont	3	64,269	44.92	-	78,371	54.78	3	-	-	-	422	0.30	-	-14,102	-9.86	3.29	143,062	VT
Virginia	11	235,961	68.08	11	109,363	31.55	-	282	0.08	-	1,001	0.29	-	126,598	36.52	-4.32	346,607	VA
Washington	8	462,145	58.22	8	322,123	40.58	-	4,586	0.58	-	4,979	0.63	-	140,022	17.64	-18.86	793,833	WA
West Virginia	8	495,662	57.10	8	372,414	42.90	-	-	-	-	-	-	-	123,248	14.20	-7.15	868,076	WV
Wisconsin	12	704,821	50.15	12	679,206	48.32	-	15,071	1.07	-	6,424	0.46	-	25,615	1.82	-31.72	1,405,522	WI
Wyoming	3	59,287	52.82	3	52,633	46.89	-	148	0.13	-	172	0.15	-	6,654	5.93	-17.17	112,240	WY
TOTALS:	531	27,313,945	54.74	449	22,347,744	44.78	82	116,599	0.23	-	123,825	0.25	-	4,966,201	9.95	-14.30	49,902,113	US

==== States that flipped from Democratic to Republican ====
- Colorado
- Indiana
- Iowa
- Kansas
- Michigan
- Nebraska
- North Dakota
- South Dakota

==== Close states ====
Margin of victory less than 1% (19 electoral votes):

1. Michigan, 0.33% (6,926 votes)

Margin of victory less than 5% (192 electoral votes):

1. Indiana, 1.42% (25,403 votes)
2. Wisconsin, 1.82% (25,615 votes)
3. Maine, 2.33% (7,473 votes)
4. Illinois, 2.43% (102,694 votes)
5. Colorado, 2.55% (14,022 votes)
6. New York, 3.56% (224,440 votes)
7. New Jersey, 3.62% (71,528 votes)
8. Minnesota, 3.83% (47,922 votes)
9. Iowa, 4.41% (53,570 votes)
10. Ohio, 4.41% (146,366 votes)
11. Missouri, 4.77% (87,467 votes)

Margin of victory between 5% and 10% (83 electoral votes):

1. Wyoming, 5.93% (6,654 votes)
2. New Hampshire, 6.44% (15,165 votes)
3. Massachusetts, 6.75% (136,822 votes)
4. Pennsylvania, 6.89% (281,187 votes) (tipping point state)
5. Connecticut, 7.14% (55,802 votes)
6. Oregon, 8.07% (38,860 votes)
7. Idaho, 9.05% (21,289 votes)
8. Delaware, 9.65% (13,159 votes)
9. Vermont, 9.86% (14,102 votes)

==== Statistics ====
Counties with Highest Percent of Vote (Democratic)

1. Terrell County, Georgia 100.00%
2. Tate County, Mississippi 99.81%
3. Lancaster County, South Carolina 99.57%
4. Calhoun County, South Carolina 99.55%
5. Chesterfield County, South Carolina 99.31%

Counties with Highest Percent of Vote (Republican)

1. McIntosh County, North Dakota 91.66%
2. Jackson County, Kentucky 88.62%
3. Gillespie County, Texas 86.74%
4. Mercer County, North Dakota 85.36%
5. Johnson County, Tennessee 84.21%

== Foreign interference ==
The British government engaged covert intelligence operations to support Roosevelt, including the planting of false news stories, wiretaps, "October surprises", and other intelligence activities. The German government had allocated $5 million as a campaign war chest via the German embassy to bribe both Republican and Democratic delegates at their 1940 conventions, using American businessman William Rhodes Davis as a conduit. Davis was sympathetic to the German cause after his meeting with Hermann Göring and was enlisted for this purpose. Later, he directed some of these funds towards supporting anti-Roosevelt radio broadcasts by the isolationist Republican labor leader John L. Lewis, with the aim of impeding Roosevelt's re-election bid, and Lewis supported the Republican candidate instead. Lewis himself had previously been pitched to the Germans by Davis as a desirable president for his non-interventionist views. Initially a supporter of Roosevelt in 1936, Davis had become disillusioned by 1940, and the two had grown apart over foreign policy. However the Germans were disappointed that the Republicans had nominated Wendell Willkie, who was not an isolationist. The German envoy in Mexico had also requested $160,000 to sway an unnamed Democratic Party operative in Pennsylvania to unseat interventionist Democratic Senator Joseph Guffey, who was a prominent critic of Nazi Germany. Davis was later identified as Abwehr agent C-80 following his death in August 1941.

== See also ==
- 1940 Communist National Convention
- 1940 Prohibition National Convention
- 1940 United States House of Representatives elections
- 1940 United States Senate elections
- History of the United States (1918–1945)
- Third inauguration of Franklin D. Roosevelt
- Bring the Jubilee, a 1953 alternative history novel by Ward Moore, set in a universe where the Confederacy won the American Civil War, where the election is contested by Whig candidate Thomas E. Dewey and Populist candidate Jennings Lewis.
- The Plot Against America, a 2004 novel by American author Philip Roth that depicts the 1940 presidential election as a contest between Franklin D. Roosevelt and aviator Charles Lindbergh.

== Works cited ==
- Sherman, Richard (1973). The Republican Party and Black America From McKinley to Hoover 1896-1933. University of Virginia Press. ISBN 0813904676.
