= Communist Youth League (disambiguation) =

Communist Youth League is a people's organization of the People's Republic of China.

Communist Youth League may also refer to:

- Communist Youth League of Colombia
- Danish Communist Youth League
- Communist Youth League (Finland)
- Communist Youth League (Japan)
- Communist Youth League of Kampuchea
- Russian Communist Youth League

== See also ==
- All pages with titles containing both Communist(s) and Young/Youth
- Young Communist League
- Young Communists (disambiguation)
- Category:Youth wings of communist parties
