= Skus =

SKUs or Skus may refer to:

- SKUs, abbreviation for stock keeping units
- Sküs, a high-ranking card in tarot card games

== See also ==
- SKU (disambiguation)
