= 1932 Communist National Convention =

- 1932 presidential election
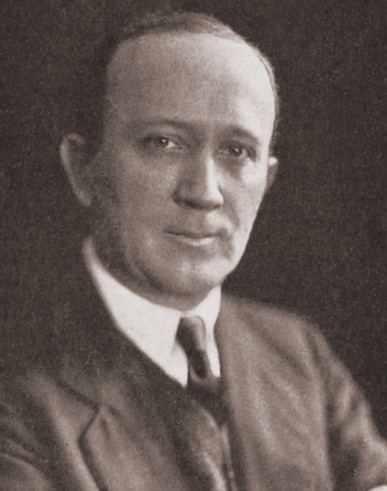
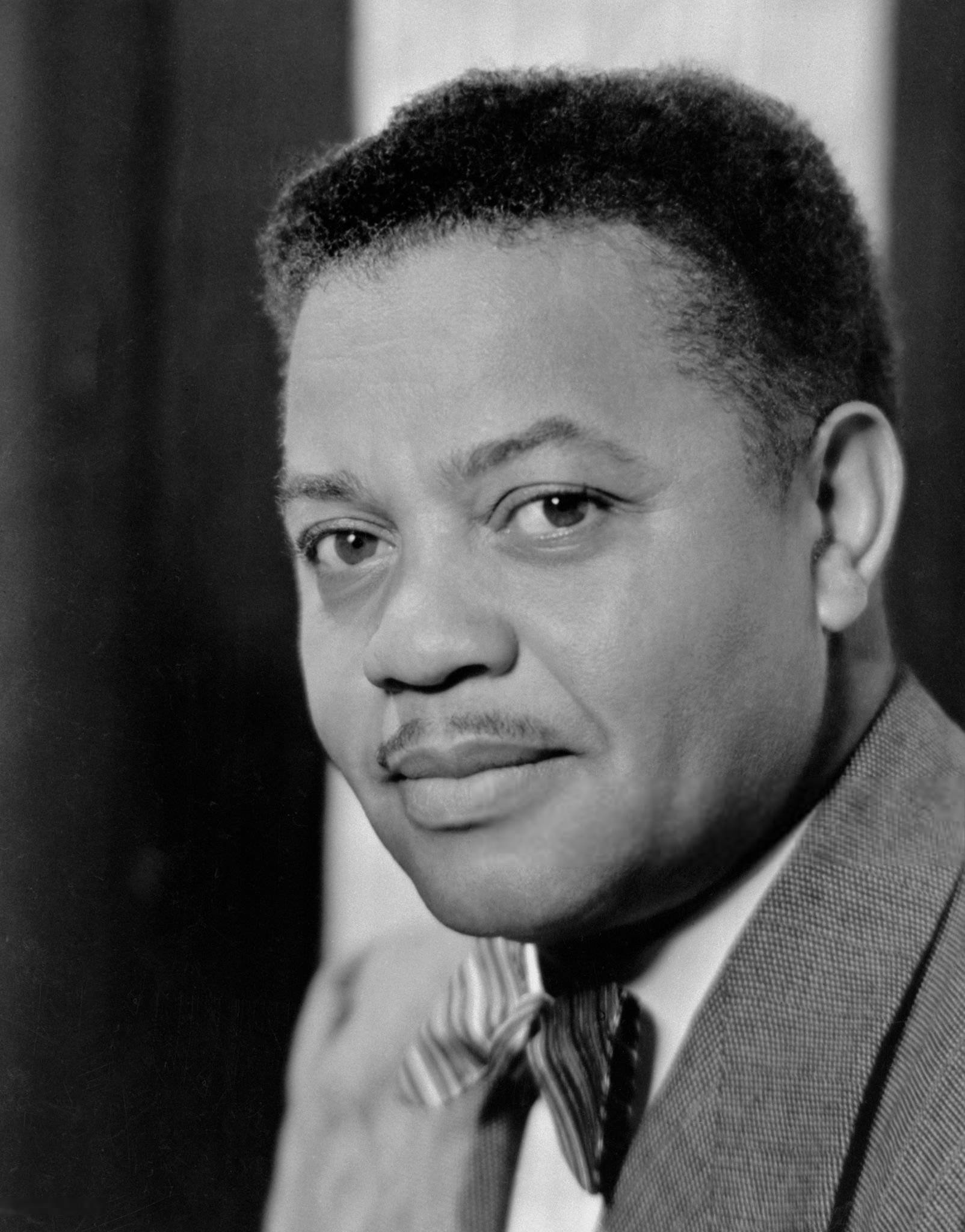
- Nominees (Foster and Ford)

Convention
- Dates: May 28–29, 1932
- City: Chicago, Illinois
- Venue: People's Auditorium (formal proceedings); Chicago Coliseum (mass session)

Candidates
- Presidential nominee: William Z. Foster of Massachusetts
- Vice-presidential nominee: James W. Ford

Voting
- Total delegates: 1,200

The 1932 Communist National Convention was held May 28–29 at the People's Auditorium and Chicago Coliseum in Chicago, Illinois. The convention saw Communist Party USA nominate William Z. Foster for president and James W. Ford for vice president.

== Logistics ==
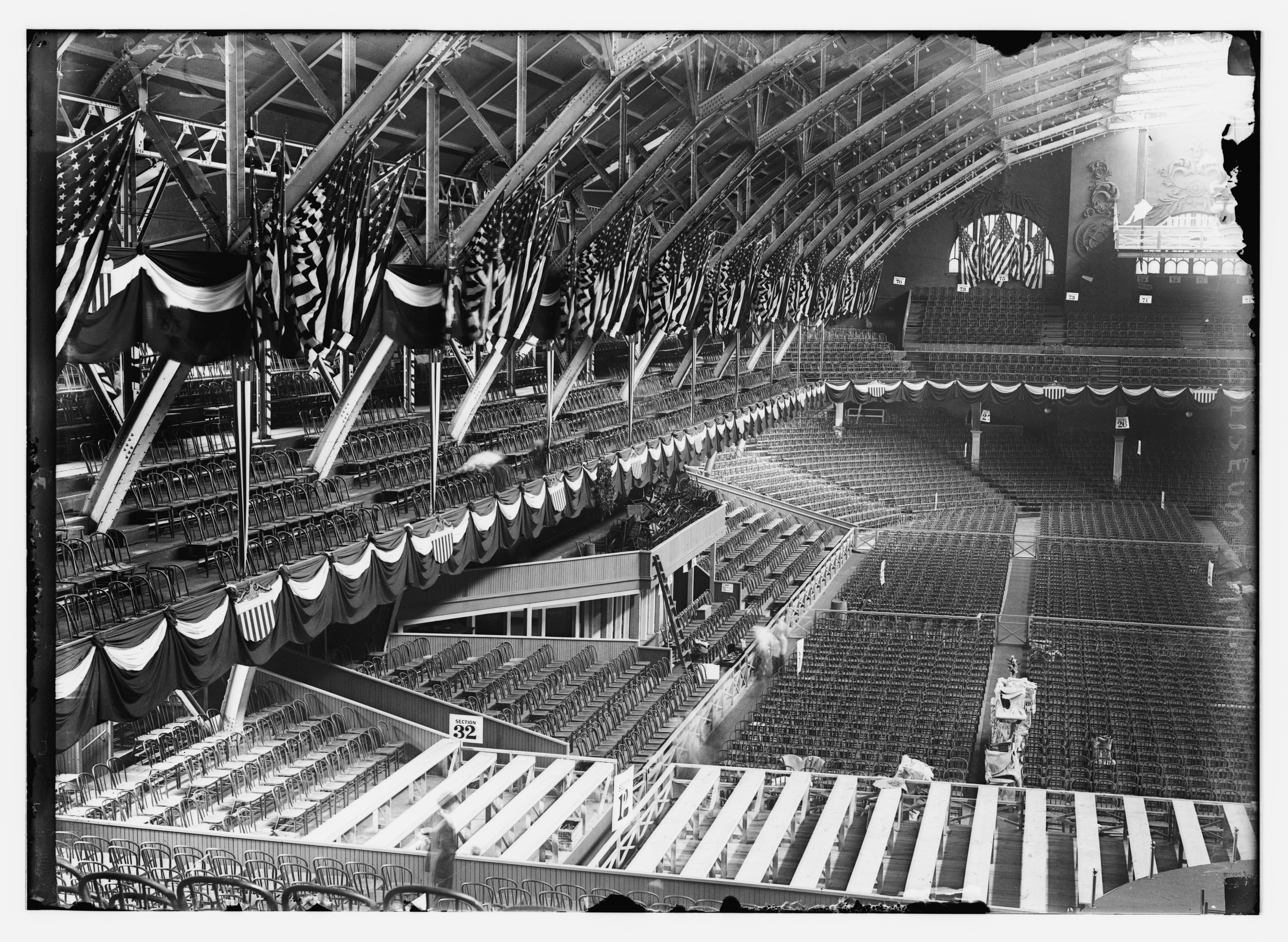
Chicago Coliseum, venue of the general session (photographed in 1912)

The convention proceedings took place May 28–29 at the People's Auditorium, a venue located on the West Side of Chicago, Illinois. On the first evening of the convention, a mass session was held at the Chicago Coliseum, a 14,000 seat venue in Chicago. Approximately 1,200 delegates attended the proceedings at the People's Auditorium, while a packed audience filled the Chicago Coliseum for the mass session. The Daily Worker advertised the crowd of the general session as having numbered 15,000 strong.

== Proceedings ==
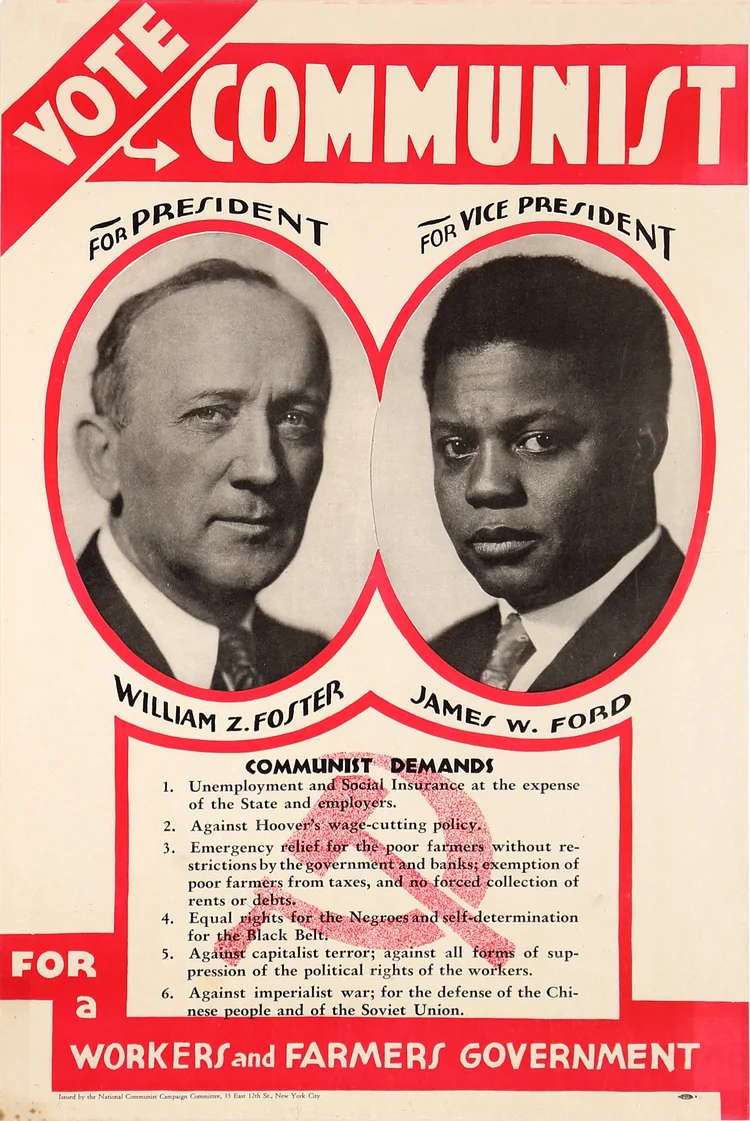
Campaign poster featuring the convention's nominees (Foster and Ford)

The first day's business included selecting William Z. Foster as presidential nominee and James W. Ford as vice presidential nominee. These nominations were then announced by Clarence Hathaway (the party's 1932 campaign manager) to party supporters at the mass session that evening.

The second day of the convention included the adoption of a platform, and addresses by William Weinstone and Clarence Hathaway. Additionally, resolutions were adopted on a variety of issues.
