= Young Communist League =

Youth wing of various communist parties

Young Communist League (YCL) is the name used by the youth wing of various Communist parties around the world. The name YCL of [country] originates from the precedent established by the Communist Youth International.

Examples of YCLs include:

- Australia – Young Communist League of Australia (now defunct; its eventual successor merged with the Left Alliance)
- Canada – Young Communist League of Canada
- Cuba – Young Communist League
- Finland – Young Communist League of Finland
- France – Mouvement Jeunes Communistes de France
- Germany – Young Communist League of Germany
- Israel - Young Communist League of Israel
- Norway – Young Communist League of Norway
- Nepal – Young Communist League, Nepal
- Portugal – Young Communist League of Portugal
- Russia – Leninist Young Communist League of the Russian Federation
- Soviet Union – Komsomol.
- Sweden – Young Communist League of Sweden
- United Kingdom – Young Communist League
- United States – Young Communist League USA

The corresponding youth organization in China is usually translated as Communist Youth League.

In Vietnam, the name of the Vietnamese YCL is translated as Ho Chi Minh Communist Youth Union

== See also ==
- Communist Youth League (disambiguation)
- Young Communists (disambiguation)
- Pioneer movement
