= 1940 Communist National Convention =

- 1940 presidential election
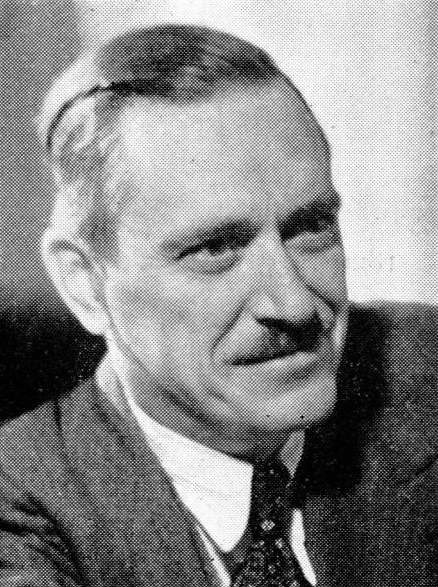
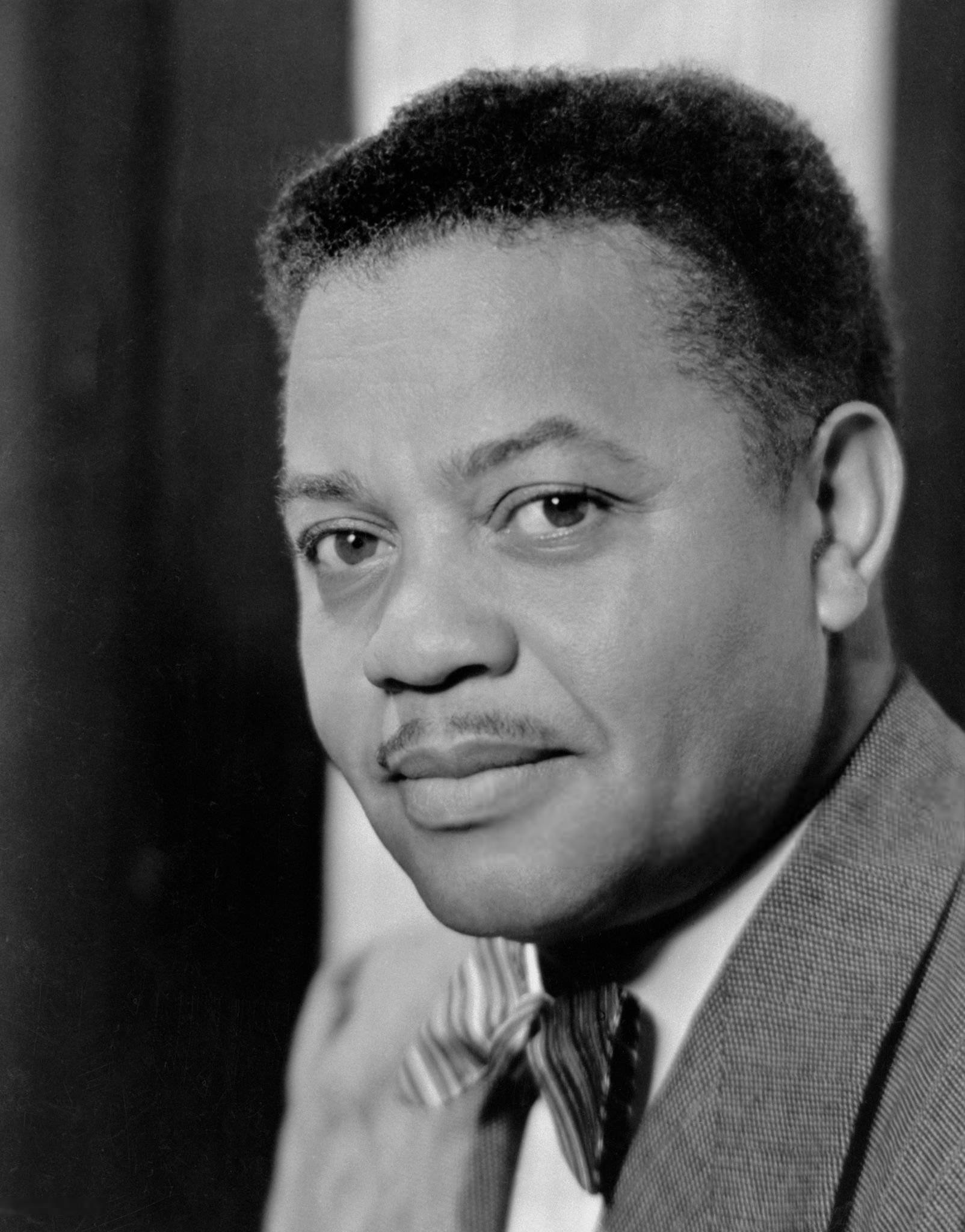
- Nominees (Browder and Ford)

Convention
- Dates: May 30–June 2, 1940
- City: Manhattan, New York City, New York
- Venue: Madison Square Garden (closing session)

Candidates
- Presidential nominee: Earl Browder of Kansas
- Vice-presidential nominee: James W. Ford of New York

Voting
- Total delegates: 2,200
- Results (president): Acclamation
- Results (vice president): Acclamation

The 1940 Communist National Convention was held May 30–June 2, 1940, in New York City. It saw Communist Party USA nominate Earl Browder for president and James W. Ford for vice president in the 1940 United States presidential election.

== Logistics ==
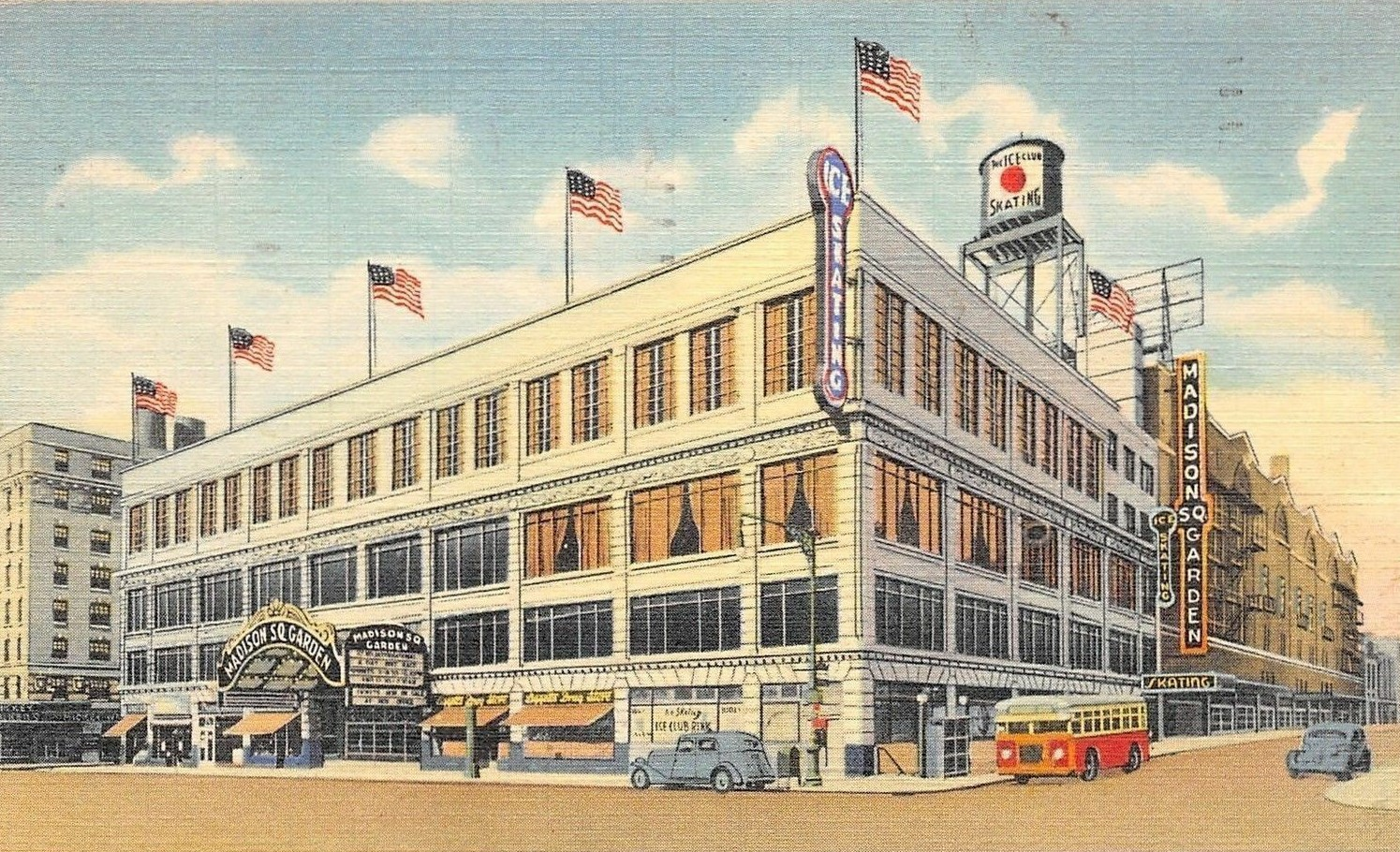
Madison Square Garden, venue of closing session

The convention was held May 30–June 2 in New York City. The convention had 2,200 delegates. The closing session of the convention was held at Madison Square Garden, with The Daily Worker advertising a crowd of 20,000 in attendance.

== Nominations ==
The convention unanimously nominated Earl Browder for president and James W. Ford for vice president. This was the same ticket that the party had nominated in the previous presidential election.

== Platform ==
After the August 1939 Molotov–Ribbentrop Pact between Nazi Germany and the Soviet Union, the party had taken a hard pivot in its position on incumbent president Franklin Delano Roosevelt's policy of sending aid to European nations fighting against Nazi Germany. Previously supportive of this policy, the party had pivoted to heavily opposing it and organizing against it. It was on this ground that the party opposed Roosevelt's re-election in 1940.

At the convention, the party adopted a platform which condemned Roosevelt's foreign policy stance. Browder described the party platform's immediate goal as being, "fight to keep America out of the war...fight against all policies which call for great armaments." Browder further wrote,

The most immediate menace of war for America is the call for moral support to the British and French empires...the already-deep economic involvement which combine to push and pull the American people, against their will, into belligerent support. Therefore the people's platform must declare to both imperialist camps, German and Allied, "A plague on both your houses!"...It must declare to the whole world, so that there shall be no encouragement of false hopes, that "The Yanks are not coming.

The party's abandonment of antifascism made it a social pariah on the American left, with many liberals ceasing to cooperate with it in the advancement of common causes.
