= Young Communist League of Sweden =

Young Communist League of Sweden or Sveriges Kommunistiska Ungdomsförbund may refer to:

- Young Left (Sweden), formerly known as Sveriges Kommunistiska Ungdomsförbund 1921-1958
- Young Communist League of Sweden (1977), a youth wing founded in 1977 by the Arbetarpartiet Kommunisterna (APK)
- Young Communist League of Sweden (2000), a youth wing founded in 2000 by the Communist Party of Sweden (the successor of APK)
