= Young Communist League of Sweden (1977) =

Political youth

Young Communist League of Sweden (Sveriges Kommunistiska Ungdomsförbund) is a political youth organization in Sweden.

When the Arbetarpartiet Kommunisterna (Workers Party - the Communists) broke out of the VPK in 1977, they founded a youth league with the name SKU. The Flamman-group in KU (Communist Youth, youth of VPK) had been expelled during 1975–1976. Later a large section of the Gävleborg district of KU affiliated itself to SKU. SKU published a magazine called Gryningen (The Dawn).

In the late 1980s SKU started to become associated with an oppositional stream within APK. In 1990 SKU broke relations the APK. Thereafter it had a short-lived period as an independent youth organization. On May Day 1990 in Stockholm SKU marched together with KU and Ungsocialisterna (youth of Socialist Party) under the banner of "Youth against Capitalism and Stalinism".
