= Church of Sweden Youth =

Children's and youth group of the Church of Sweden

- Svenska kyrkans unga
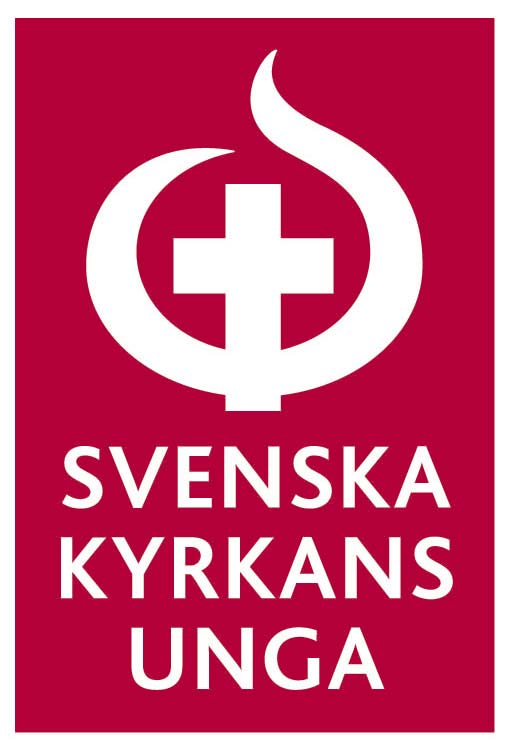
- Formation: 1 January 1993
- Type: Christian youth organization
- Headquarters: Drottninggatan 4, Uppsala, Sweden
- Methods: children and youth activities
- Members: 13 000 (2013)
- Official language: Swedish
- chairperson: Tova Mårtensson

The Church of Sweden Youth (Swedish: Svenska kyrkans unga) is the children's and youth group of the Church of Sweden. It was established on 1 January 1993 following a merger of several youth groups within the denomination. In 2013, there were 13 000 members of various ages.

A merger was proposed already in 1964 but didn't become reality until a meeting on 6 December 1992.

== Organization ==
At the national level, the National Assembly (Swedish: Riskårsmöte (Shortening: RÅM)) is the highest decision-making body to which the districts send representatives.

At the regional level, the annual district meeting (Swedish: Distriktsårsmöte (Shortening: DÅM)) is the highest decision-making body. DÅM is arranged annually, and the local branches in the district appoint representatives to DÅM in relation to the local branch's membership size. The representatives at the annual meeting, DÅM, will always appoint people to represent the district at RÅM.

At the local level, the local branch's annual meeting (Swedish: Lokalavdelningsårsmöte (Shortening: LAÅM)) or members' meeting is the highest decision-making body where all local branch members have voting rights.

At LAÅM, a local branch board is often elected (some small local branches do not have a board), which makes all executive decisions in the local branch. In local departments with their financial management, the board also makes all financial decisions, considering the budget adopted by the annual meeting. At LAÅM, delegates get elected at this meeting to represent the local branch at the district's annual meeting.

== Chairpersons ==
Following people have been chairpersons.

- 1993-1994 - Gunilla Casserstedt Lundgren
- 1994-1997 - Helena Karlsson
- 1997-2001 - David Sundén
- 2001-2005 - Erik Persson
- 2005-2009 - Maria Wingård
- 2009-2013 - Johan Berkman
- 2013-2017 - Amanda Carlshamre
- 2017-2021- Jakob Schwarz
- 2021- Tova Mårtensson
