= Carl Vedro =

Ukrainian American activist (1908–2006)

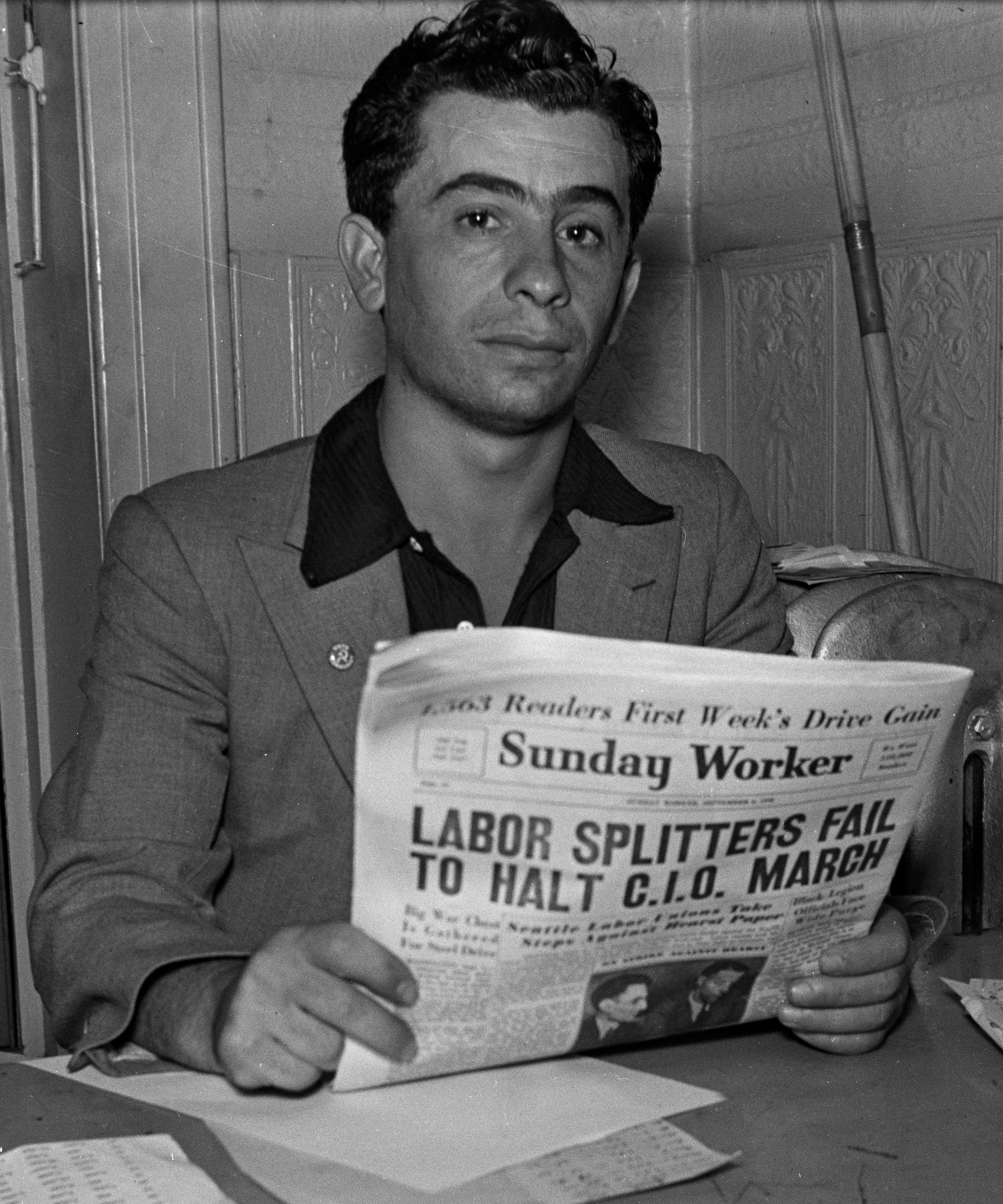
Vedro in 1936

Carl Vedro (born Leo Krassen; 1908 – September 10, 2006) was a Ukrainian American communist activist who served as chairman of the Kings County Communist Party in the late 1940s, as well as campaign manager for Peter V. Cacchione, the first open member of the Communist Party elected to public office in the state of New York.

== Early life ==
Vedro was born Leo Krassen in Ukraine (then a part of the Russian Empire) in 1908 to a Jewish family. His family fled the pogroms of the Russian Civil War, arriving at Ellis Island in 1922. Krassen was radicalized by a trip to the Pennsylvania coalfields in 1930, joining the Communist Party USA under the name "Carl Vedro" upon his return.

== Campaign manager ==
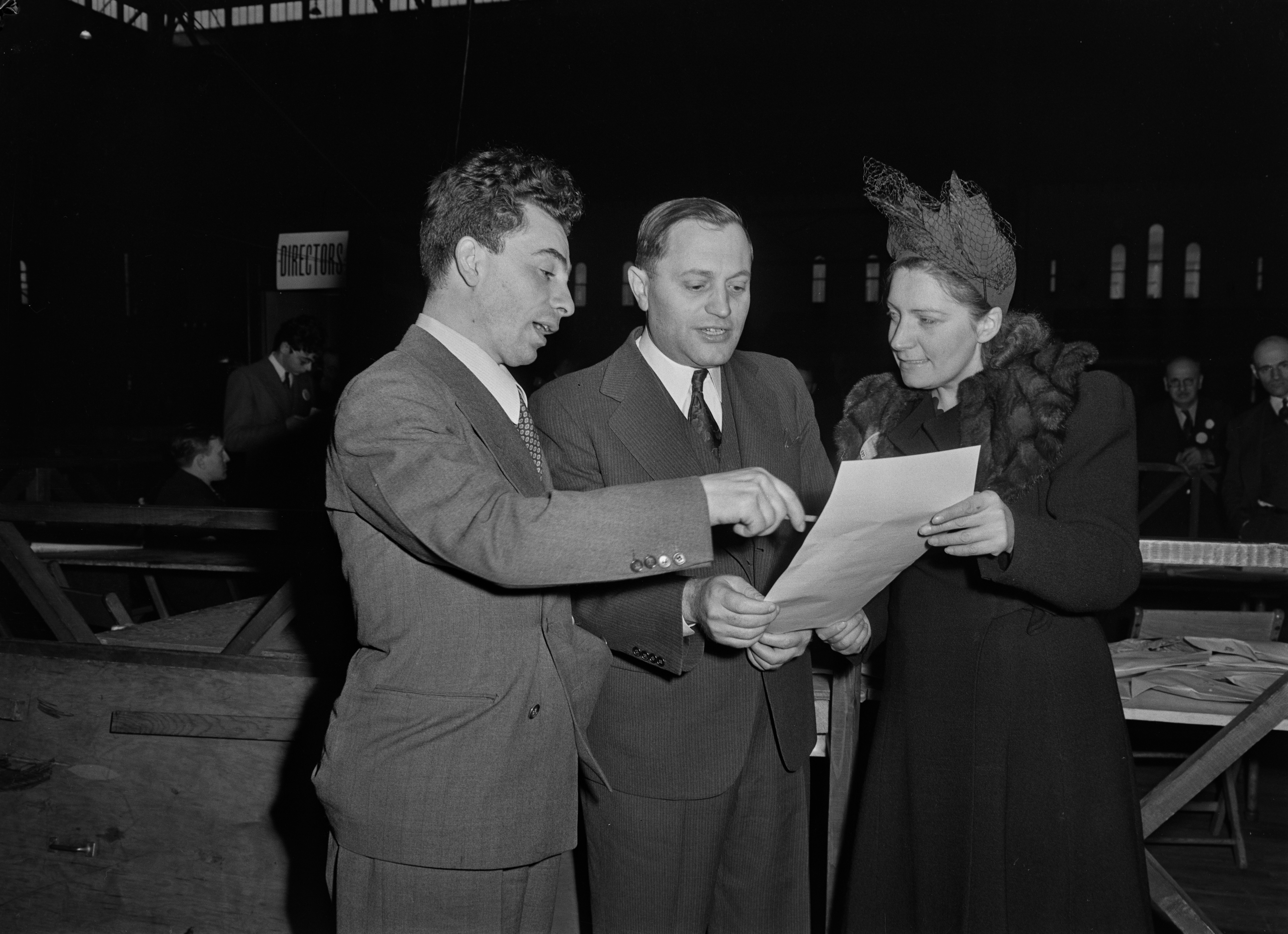
Vedro (left) views election returns with Peter and Dorothy Cacchione at the 102nd Quartermaster Regiment Armory in Brooklyn, New York, November 12, 1941

By April 1936, Vedro was section organizer of Section 17 of the Party, covering Coney Island, Brighton Beach, Kings Highway, Midwood, Bensonhurst and Bath Beach. In 1937, after the outbreak of the Spanish Civil War, he joined the Abraham Lincoln Brigade but the Party did not allow him to leave, reassigning him to be campaign manager for Peter V. Cacchione, its candidate for New York City Council in the Brooklyn at-large district. Although unsuccessful, Cacchione outperformed expectations, coming within 367 votes of winning.

After the election, Vedro became section organizer in Brownsville. In 1939, he was again named Cacchione's campaign manager. This time, the Party was struck from the ballot on a procedural technicality, forcing them to wage a write-in campaign. Once again unsuccessful, Cacchione nevertheless earned 24,132 first-choice votes (just 6,000 less than his 1937 voteshare) thanks to campaign songs, radio addresses, and pencils inscribed with his name.

After a stint as section organizer in Williamsburg, Vedro was once more named Cacchione's campaign manager in 1941. Despite the fact that a heart condition kept Cacchione from campaigning for most of the race, he was finally elected with 34,748 first-choice votes and 48,629 votes after eliminations. In an interview with George Morris of the Daily Worker, Vedro stated:

The main thing I want to drive home... is that this campaign was put over by thousands of people and a lot of hard work. We didn't have the money and newspaper publicity that other candidates had, but we had the people who were willing to give their time, work from morning until night, and do their work conscientiously. They went into every neighborhood, faced numerous obstacles, prejudice, and deliberate obstruction. But it is to the credit of our people and Communist Party branches that they have shown initiative and an ability to overcome difficulties.

— Daily Worker, November 17, 1941

== Later career ==
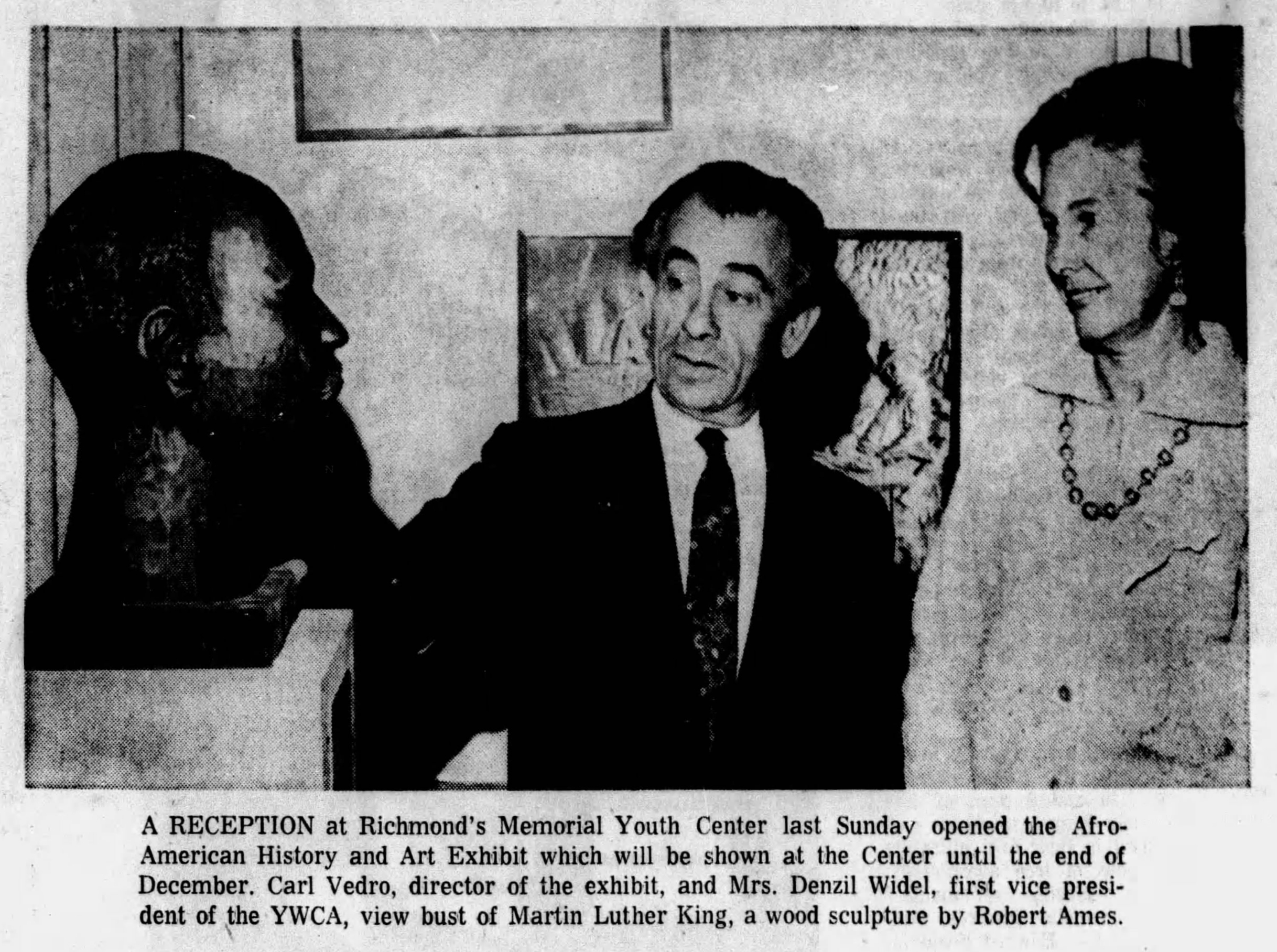
Vedro views a bust of Martin Luther King Jr. at the Richmond Memorial Youth Center, November 24, 1968

Vedro served as a tank driver in the U.S. Army during World War II, fighting in the Battle of the Bulge and the Liberation of Paris and receiving two Purple Hearts. After returning home he served as executive secretary of the Kings County Communist Party from 1946 to 1947, then as chairman from 1947 to 1950, succeeding Cacchione in the latter position following his death. Vedro supported the Party's campaign against "White Chauvinism", comparing anti-Black racism to antisemitism.

Vedro was forced to go underground during the Red Scare, relocating to California by the 1960s, where he collaborated with Sue Bailey and Howard Thurman in managing progressive art exhibits and events. He was politically active as late as 2005 when, as a resident of the Jewish Home in San Francisco, he refused to be fed by scabbing workers. He died at the Home on September 10, 2006, aged 98. He was survived by his second wife, four children, and eight grandchildren.
