= Peter Cacchione =

American politician (1897–1947)

Pete Cacchione
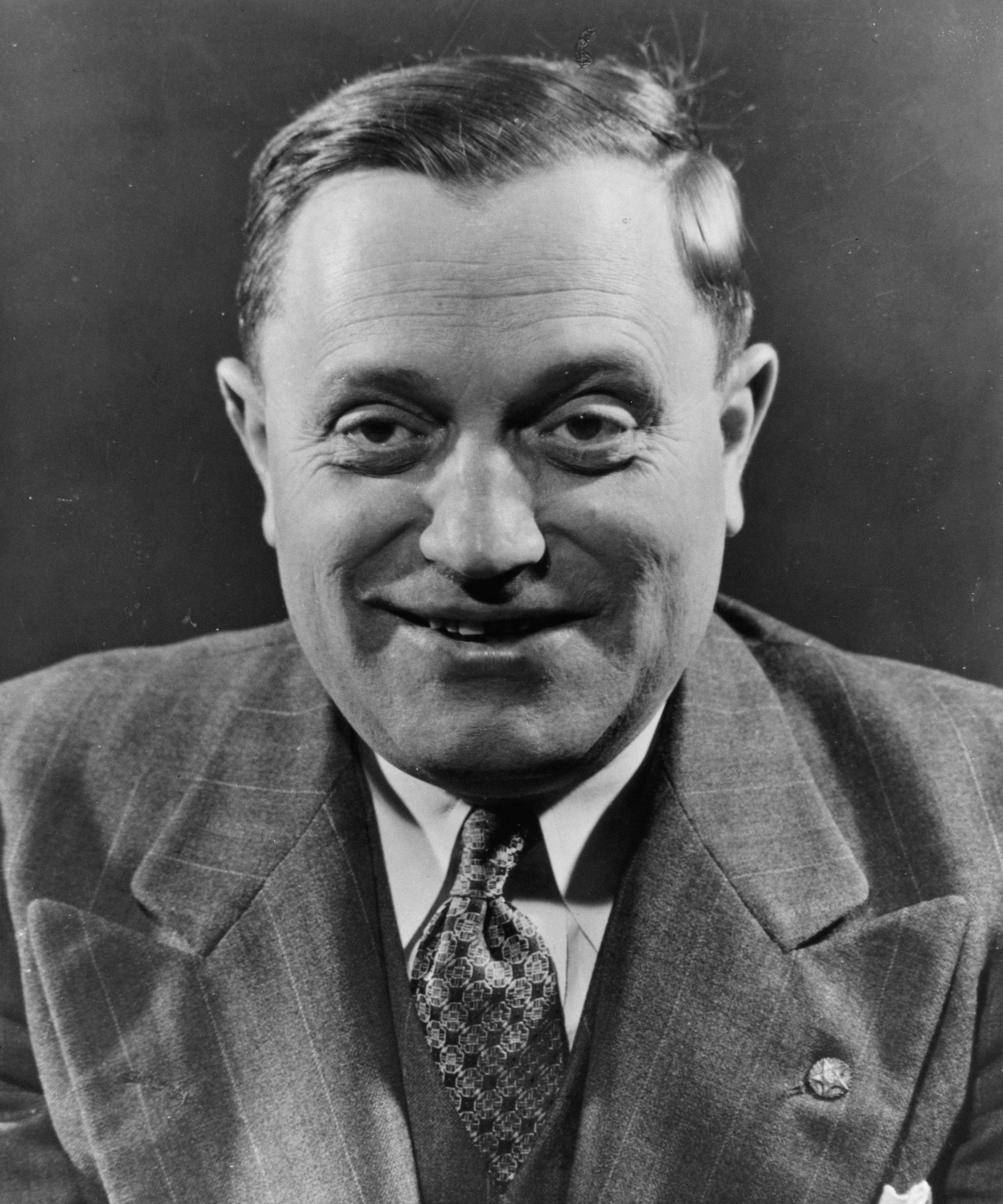
- Cacchione c. 1943

Member of the New York City Council from Brooklyn At-Large
- In office January 1, 1942 – November 6, 1947
- Preceded by: Multi-member district
- Succeeded by: Jack Kranis

Personal details
- Born: November 1, 1897 Syracuse, New York, U.S.
- Died: November 6, 1947 (aged 50) New York City, U.S.
- Resting place: Kensico Cemetery
- Party: Communist
- Spouse: Dorothy Rosenfeld (m. 1937)
- Children: Bernard
- Occupation: Politician, labor leader, activist
- Known for: First Communist elected to public office in New York

Military service
- Allegiance: United States
- Branch/service: United States Army
- Years of service: 1918
- Rank: Private
- Battles/wars: World War I

Peter Vincent "Pete" Cacchione (November 1, 1897 – November 6, 1947) was an American communist labor leader and politician who served on the New York City Council from 1942 until his death in 1947. He was the first open member of the Communist Party elected to public office in the state of New York.

== Early life ==
Peter Vincent Cacchione was born to an Italian-American immigrant family in Syracuse, New York, on November 1, 1897, and grew up in Sayre, Pennsylvania. After graduating high school, he was director of sports activities for the Catholic Welfare Council, later becoming a steel worker in Bethlehem, a street car conductor, riveter and trainman on the Lackawanna Railroad. He served in the U.S. Army during World War I.

== Career ==
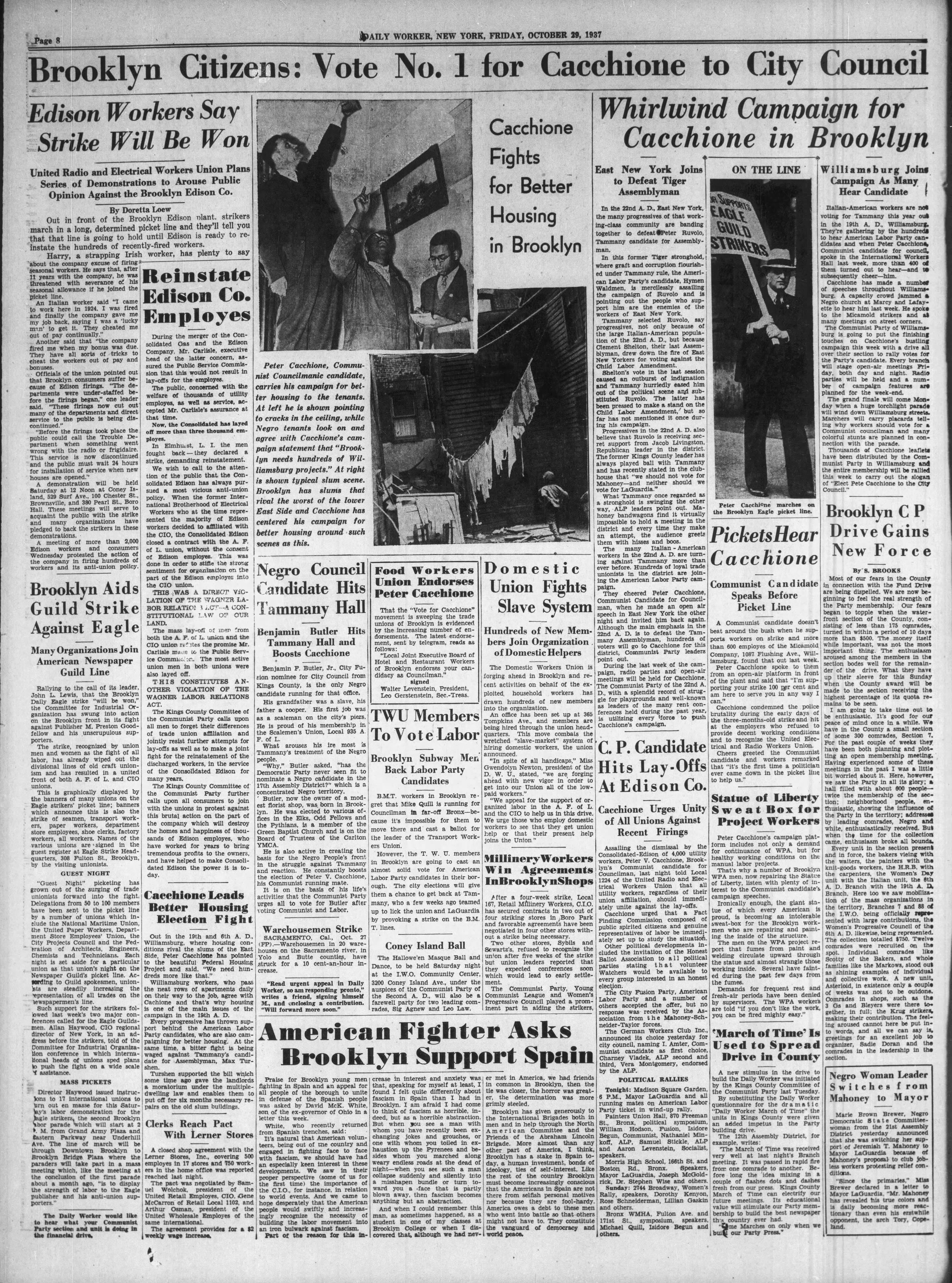
Extensive coverage of Cacchione's first city council campaign in the Daily Worker, October 29, 1937

Cacchione entered politics through the Unemployed Councils, joining the Communist Party USA in 1932 and leading a delegation of the communist-affiliated Workers Ex-Servicemen's League in the 1932 Bonus March on Washington, D.C. He became National Commander of the League in 1935.

Cacchione moved to the Bronx, New York in 1932 and was elected Bronx County Chairman of the Communist Party in 1934. After relocating to Brooklyn in 1936, he was elected Kings County Chairman of the Party, serving in that position for the rest of his life.

In 1936, New York City voters amended the City Charter to implement the proportional representation system for council elections beginning with the 1937 election cycle. Cacchione ran that year losing by a slim margin of only 300 votes. He ran again in 1939 but was thrown off the ballot along with all the other communist candidates on procedural technicalities. He was finally elected in 1941, making him the first open member of the Communist Party elected to public office in the state of New York. He was re-elected in 1943 and 1945, the last time receiving the full quota of 75,000 votes to guarantee him a seat.

Immediately after his election in 1941, Councilman Hugh Quinn, Democrat of Queens, announced that he would challenge Cacchione's right to sit on the Council pursuant to the Devaney Law. Other Council members opined that they preferred him to openly disseminate his political doctrines on the council rather than to do so through "underground channels." Despite Cacchione's political affiliation, he came to be genuinely popular and well-liked by his fellow councilmen. Another Communist, Benjamin J. Davis Jr., was elected to the Council in 1943.

== Personal life and death ==
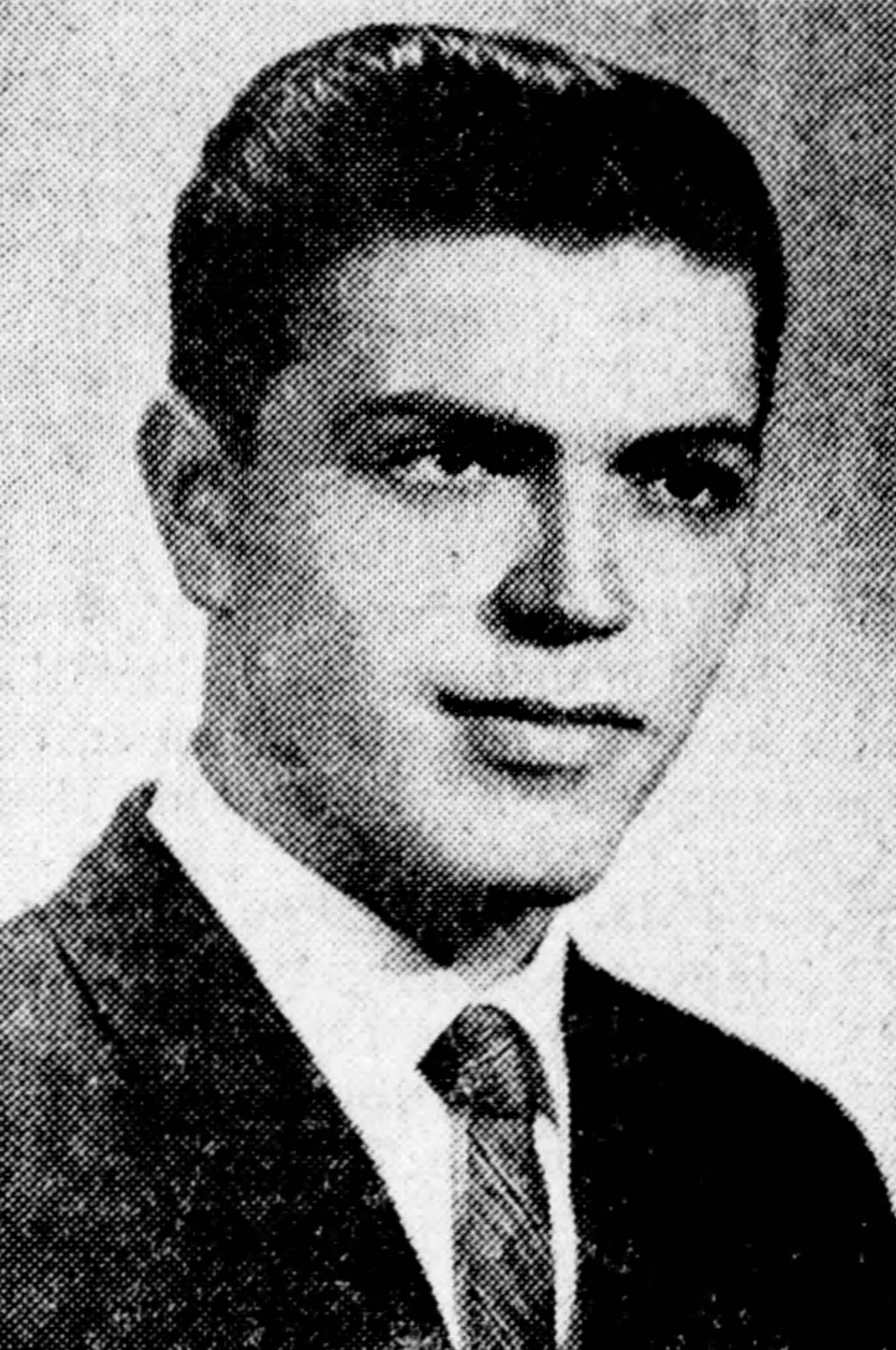
Cacchione's son Bernard c. 1962

Cacchione was a fan of the Lone Ranger radio series, going so far as to avoid speaking engagements while it was on the air. He married Dorothy Rosenfeld, his secretary at the Workers Ex-Servicemen's League, in May 1937. Together they had one son, Bernard Thomas "Bernie" Cacchione, born in July 1940. Bernard later graduated from Brooklyn College in 1962 and was elected vice president of Local 371 of the Social Service Employees Union, representing employees of the New York City Department of Social Services, in 1964.

On November 6, 1947, Cacchione died of a sudden heart attack at his home in Brooklyn. He had returned from a council meeting earlier that day. His death prompted condolences from mayor William O'Dwyer, fellow councilman Eugene P. Connolly, and the Communist Party itself. Carl Vedro, manager of Cacchione's first three campaigns, succeeded him as chairman of the Party in Kings County.

== Succession controversy ==
Under New York City law, council vacancies had to be filled by a member of the same political party as the previous officeholder, but when the Communist Party nominated Si Gerson, former city editor of the Daily Worker, the council refused on the grounds that the Communist Party was not legally a political party. Instead, the seat was left vacant, and a special election was held the following year. Although Gerson received the nominations of the Communist and American Labor parties (earning 18,000 votes on the former ballot line and 132,000 votes on the latter), he came in third place with 15% of the vote, behind Republican Jacob P. Lefkowitz and Democrat Jack Kranis, the victor.

== Daily Worker gallery ==
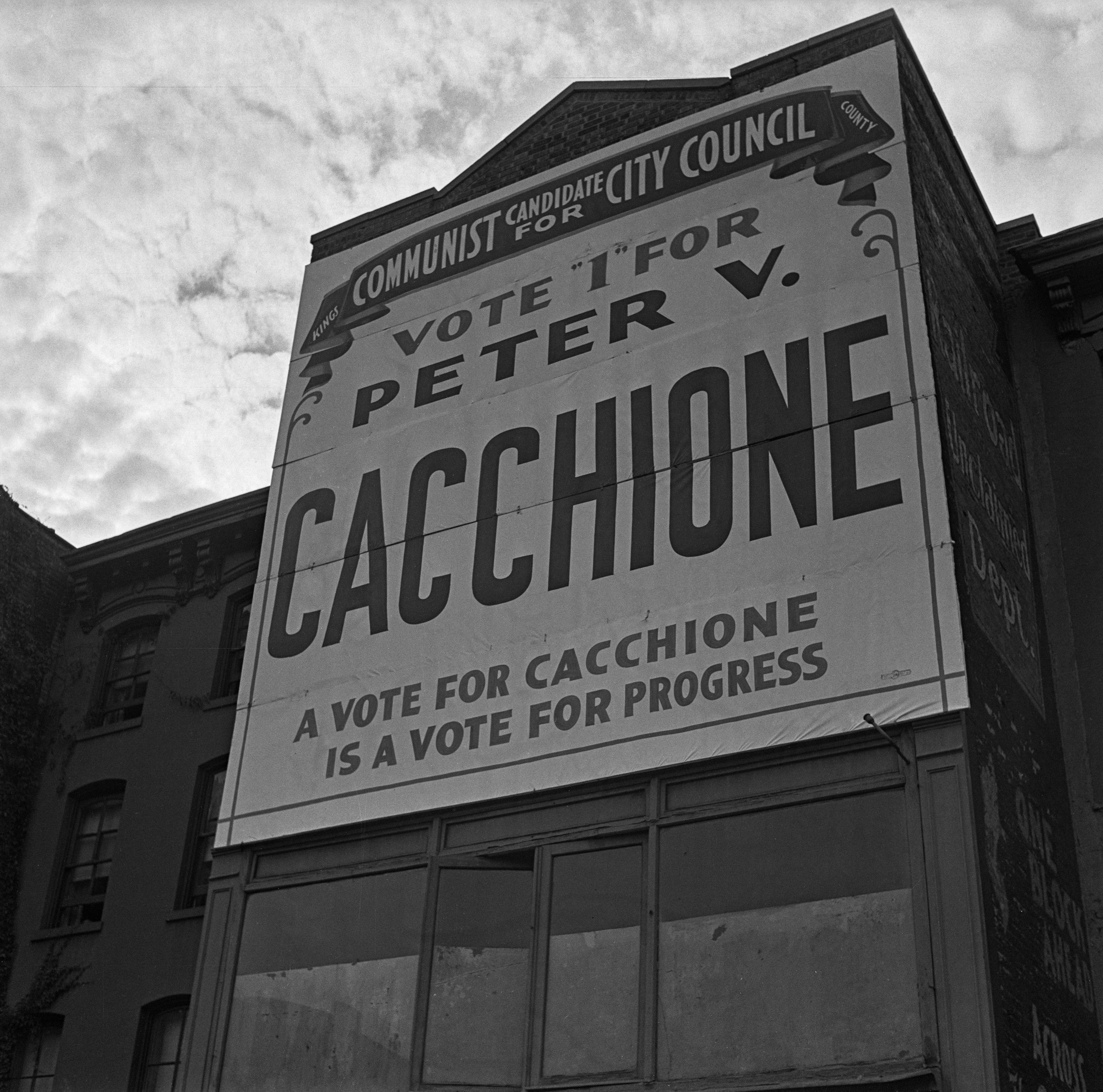
"Peter V. Cacchione Kings County Campaign Headquarters" September 21, 1937

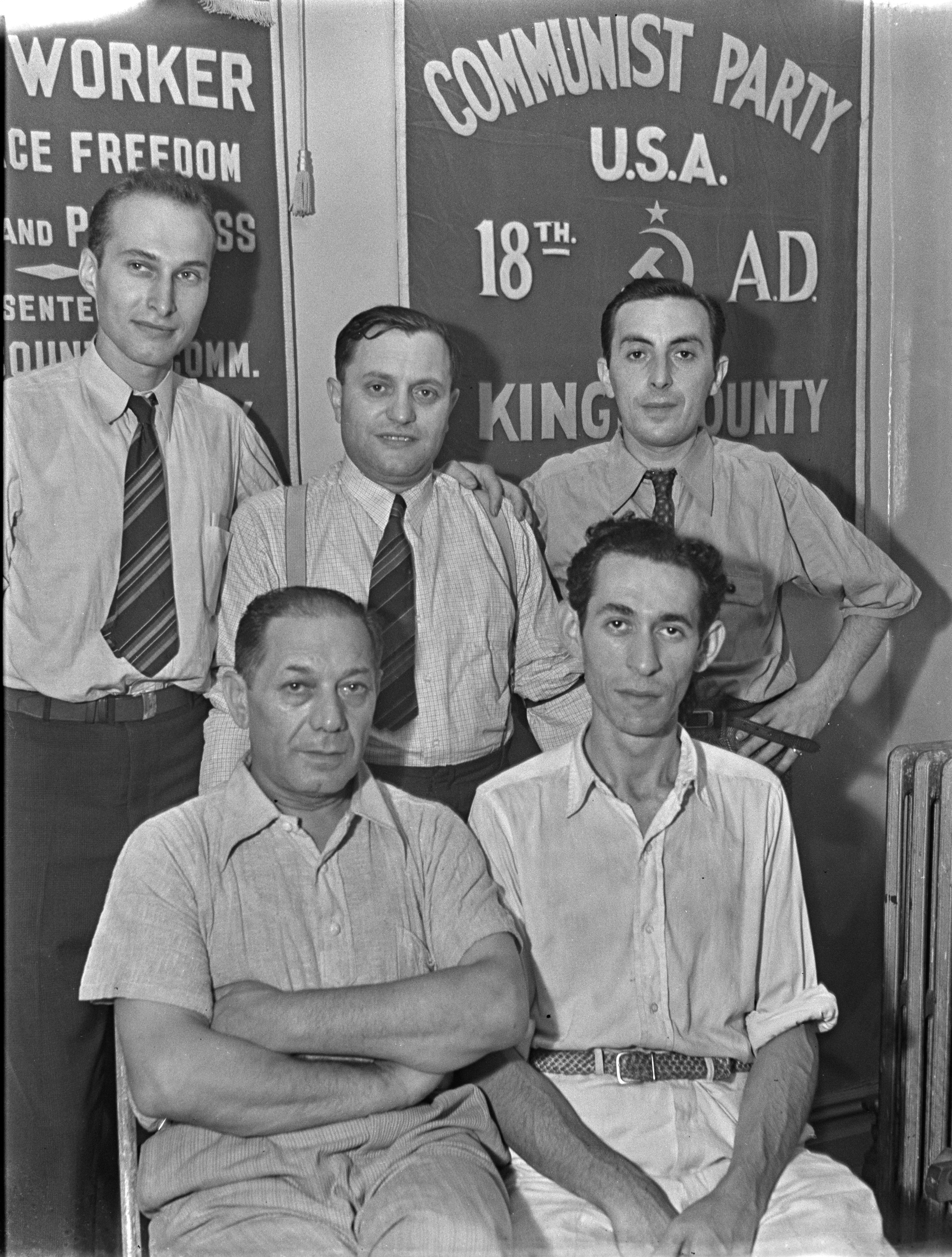
"Competing in Fund Drive" August 25, 1938

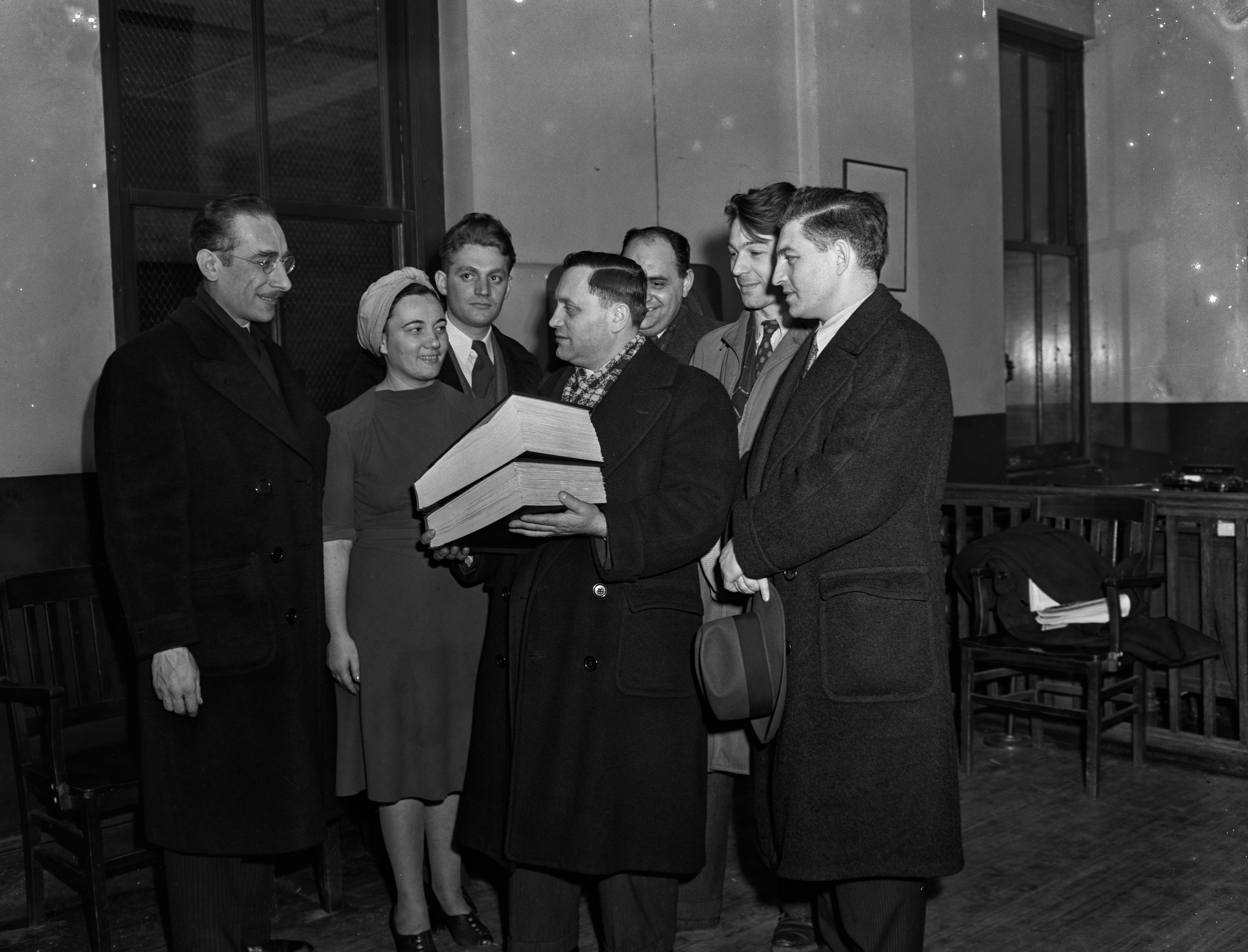
"File Nominating Petitions" February 4, 1941

"18,000 Say 'Free Browder' at Velodrome Rally; Hit Convoys" May 25, 1941

"At Brooklyn Election Rally" October 8, 1941

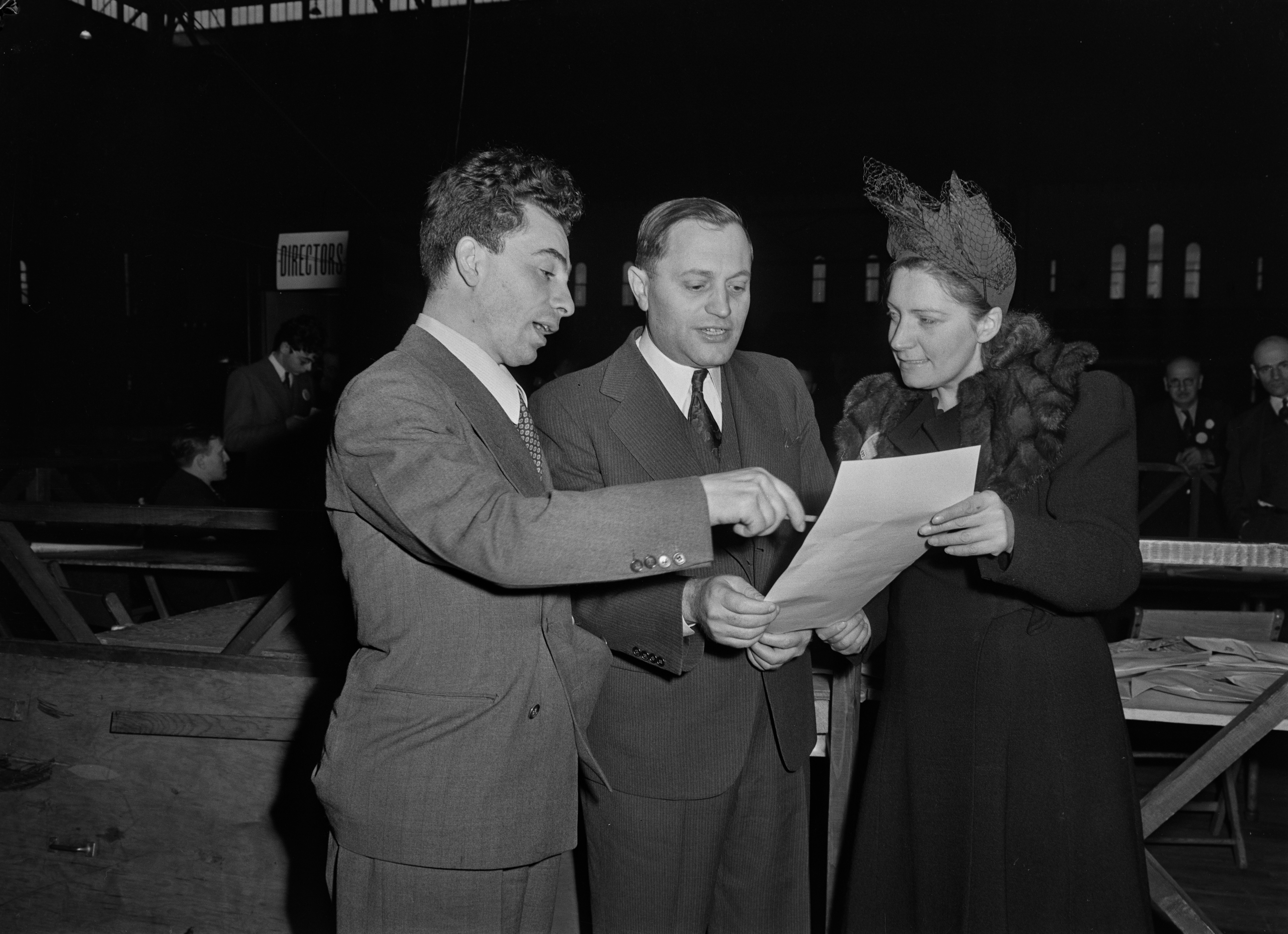
"Just Before the Victory" November 12, 1941

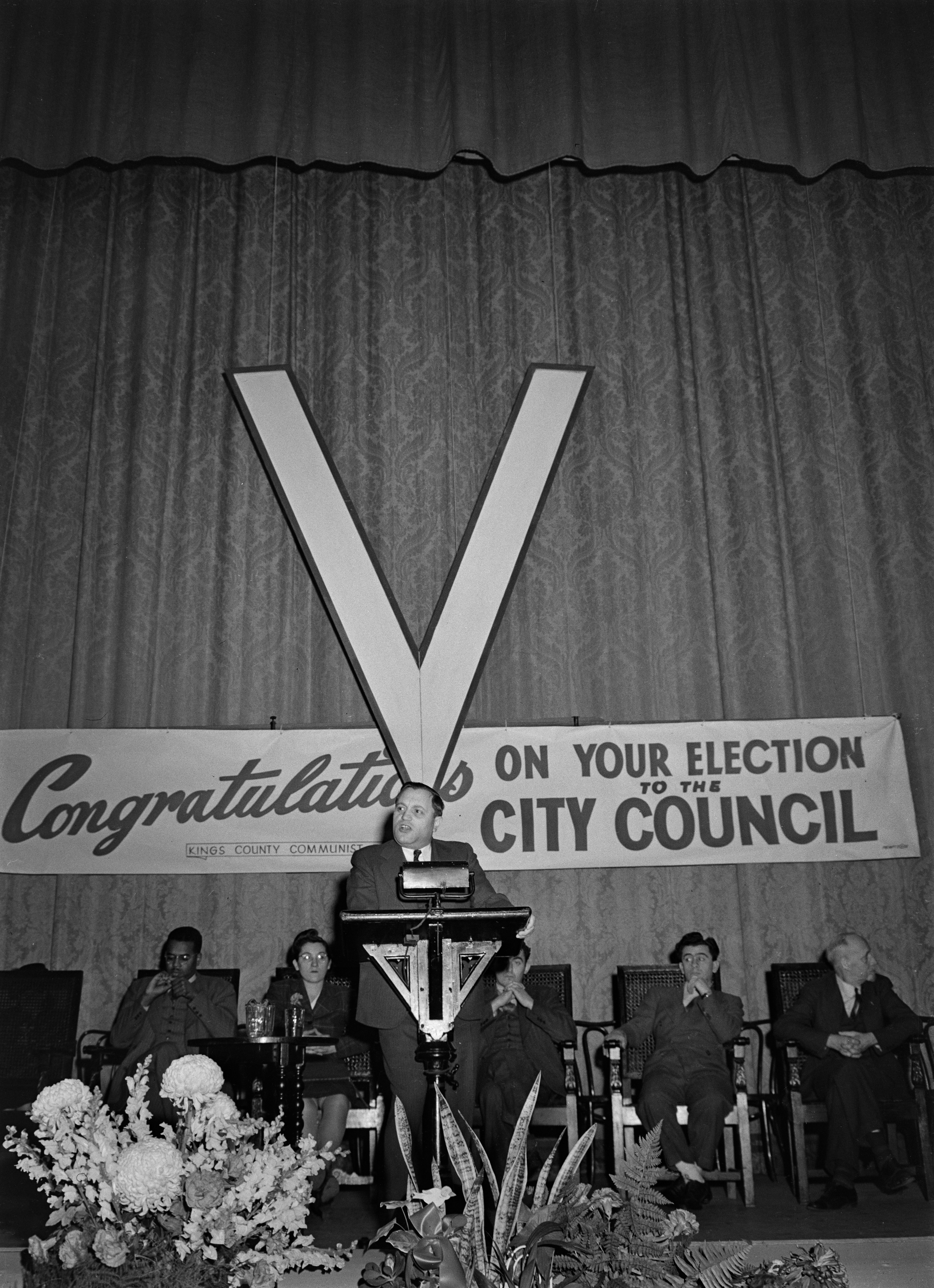
"Celebrating Cacchione's Victory" November 24, 1941

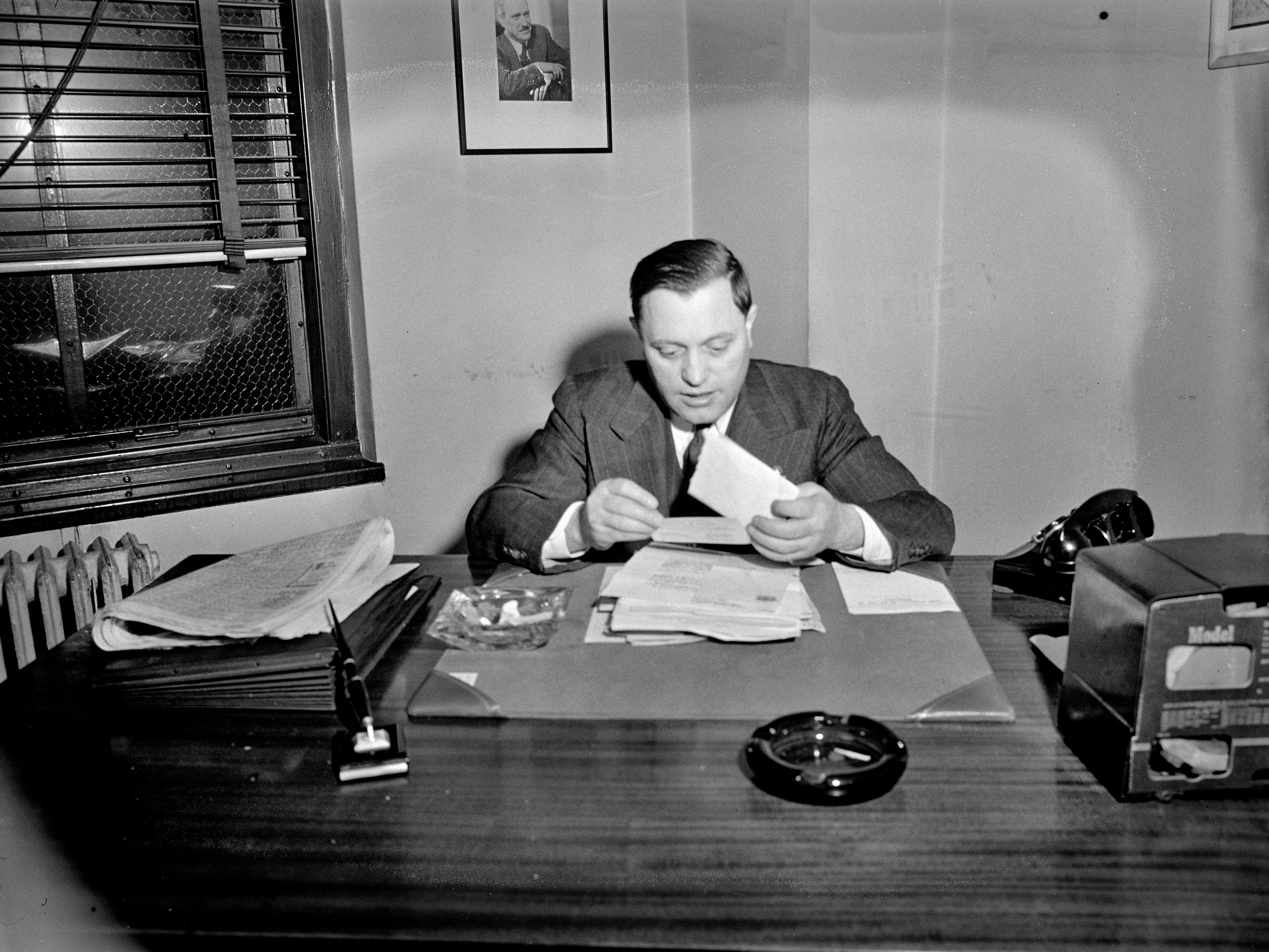
"'Pete' Cacchione Sets New Pace in City Council" April 4, 1943

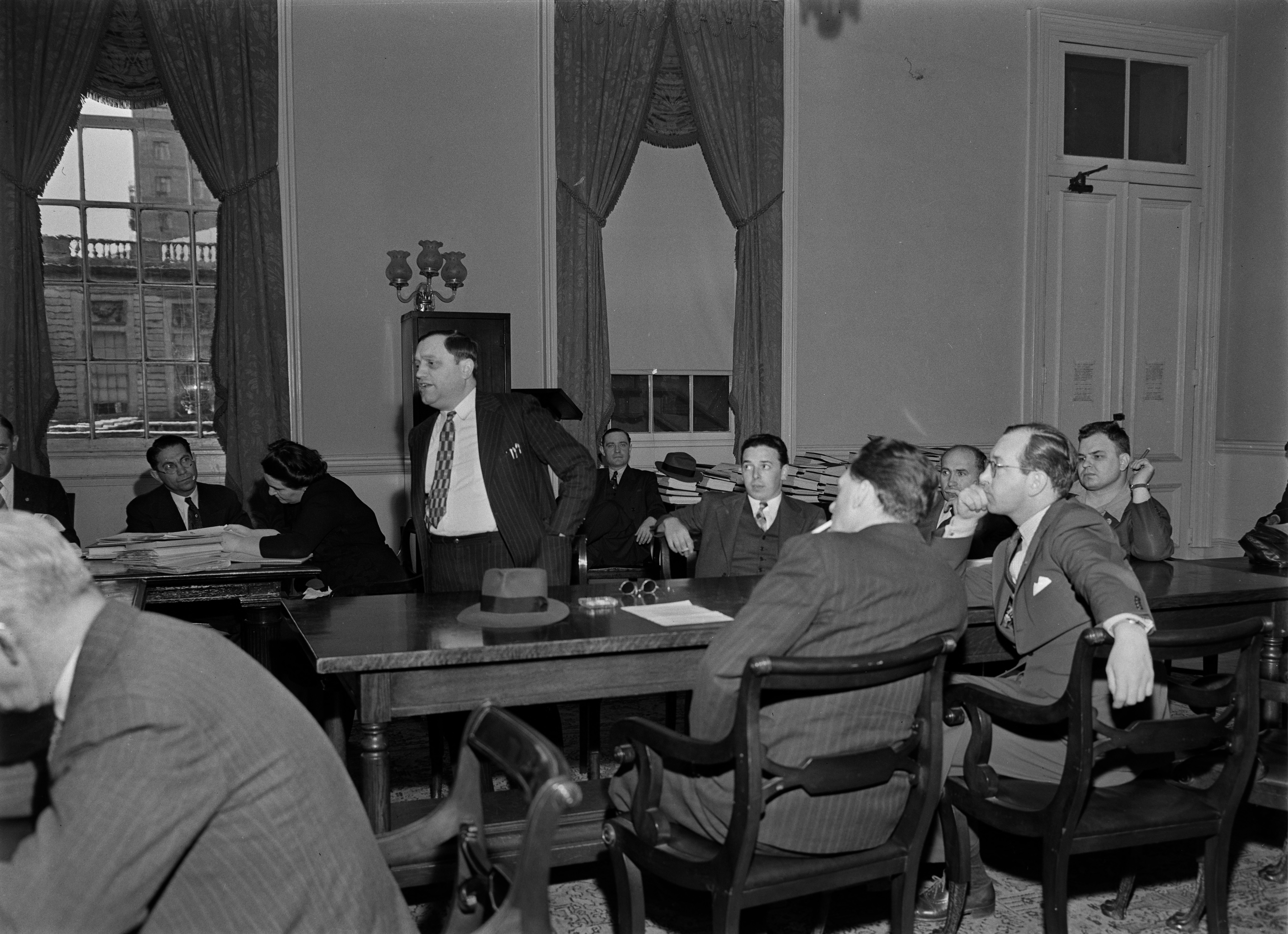
"Councilman Cacchione Addressing a City Council Committee Hearing" May 2, 1943

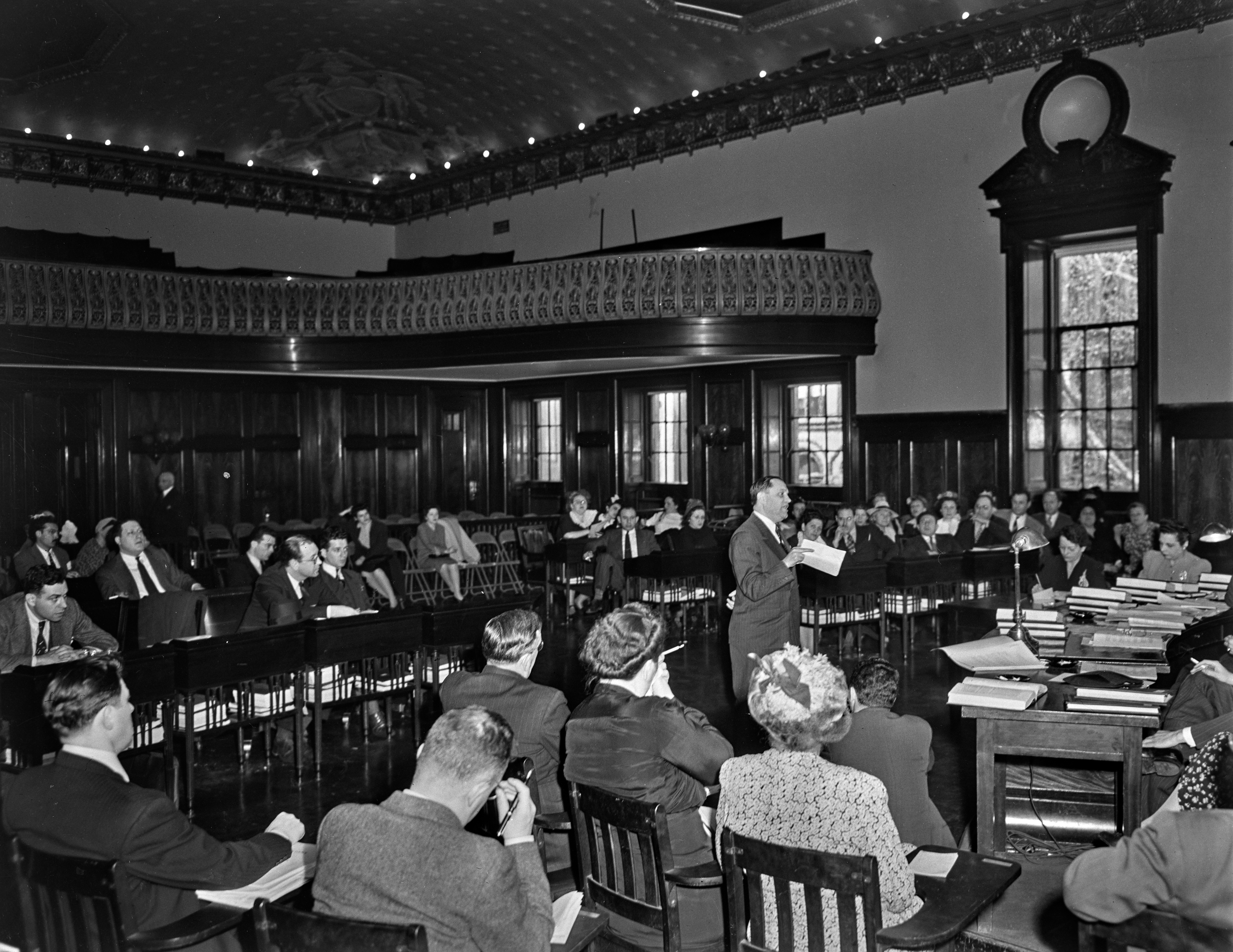
"Seeks Solution of Transit Problems" May 7, 1943

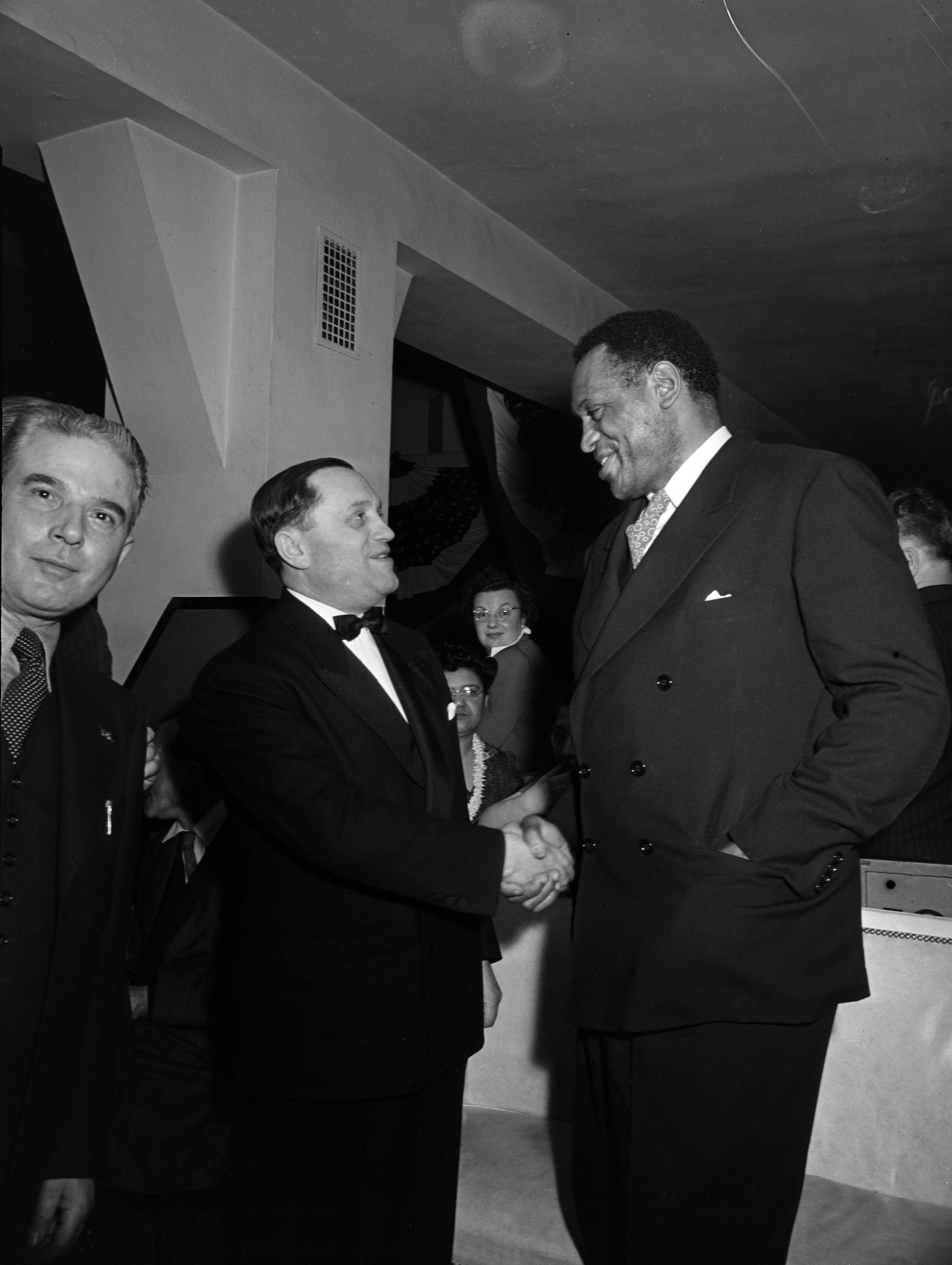
"Two People's Champions" May 22, 1943

"'He's My Choice!'" October 3, 1943

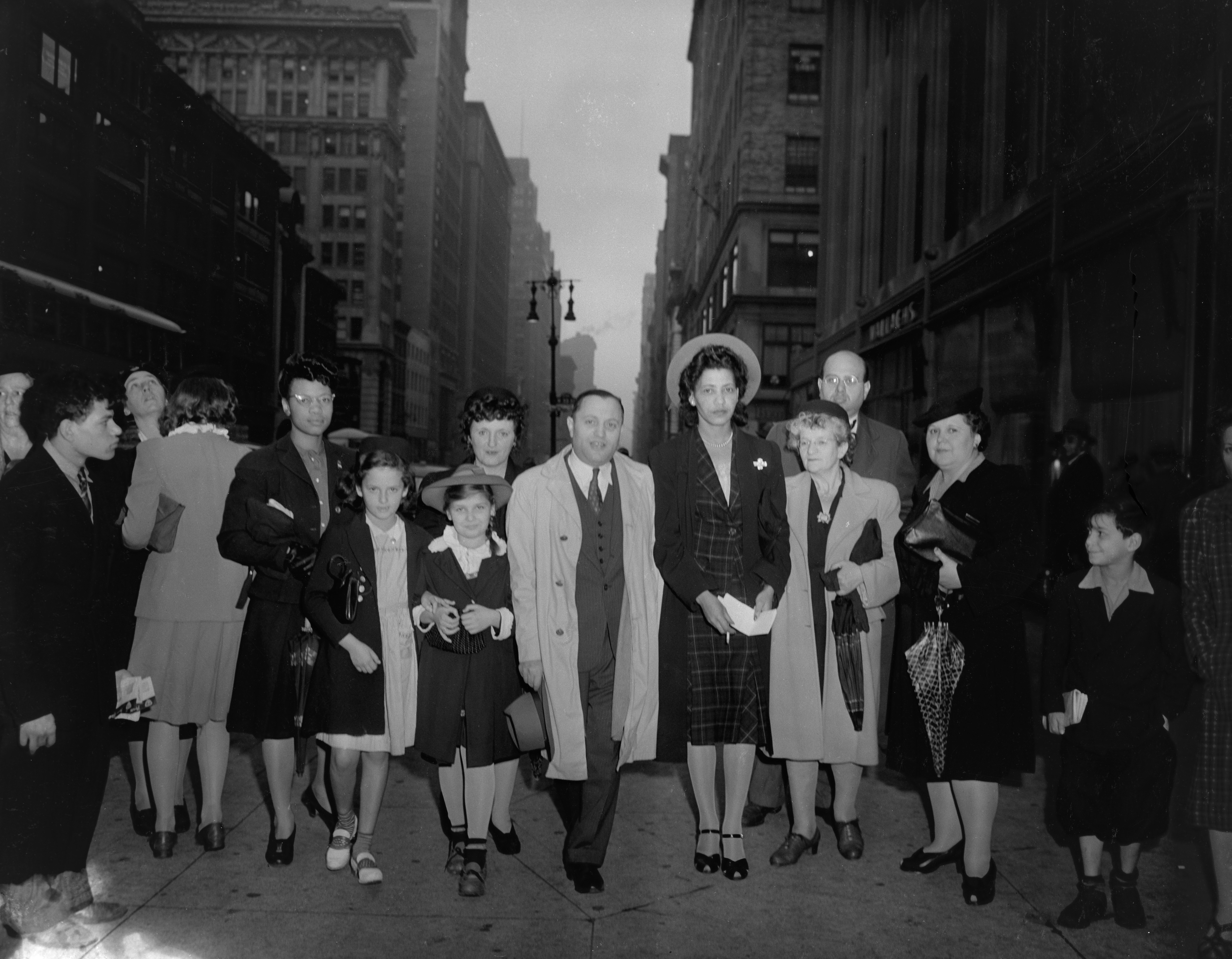
"Cacchione Battles for Real Rent Freeze" October 16, 1943

"Cacchione at Work" October 27, 1943

"Cacchione Votes for Victory" November 2, 1943

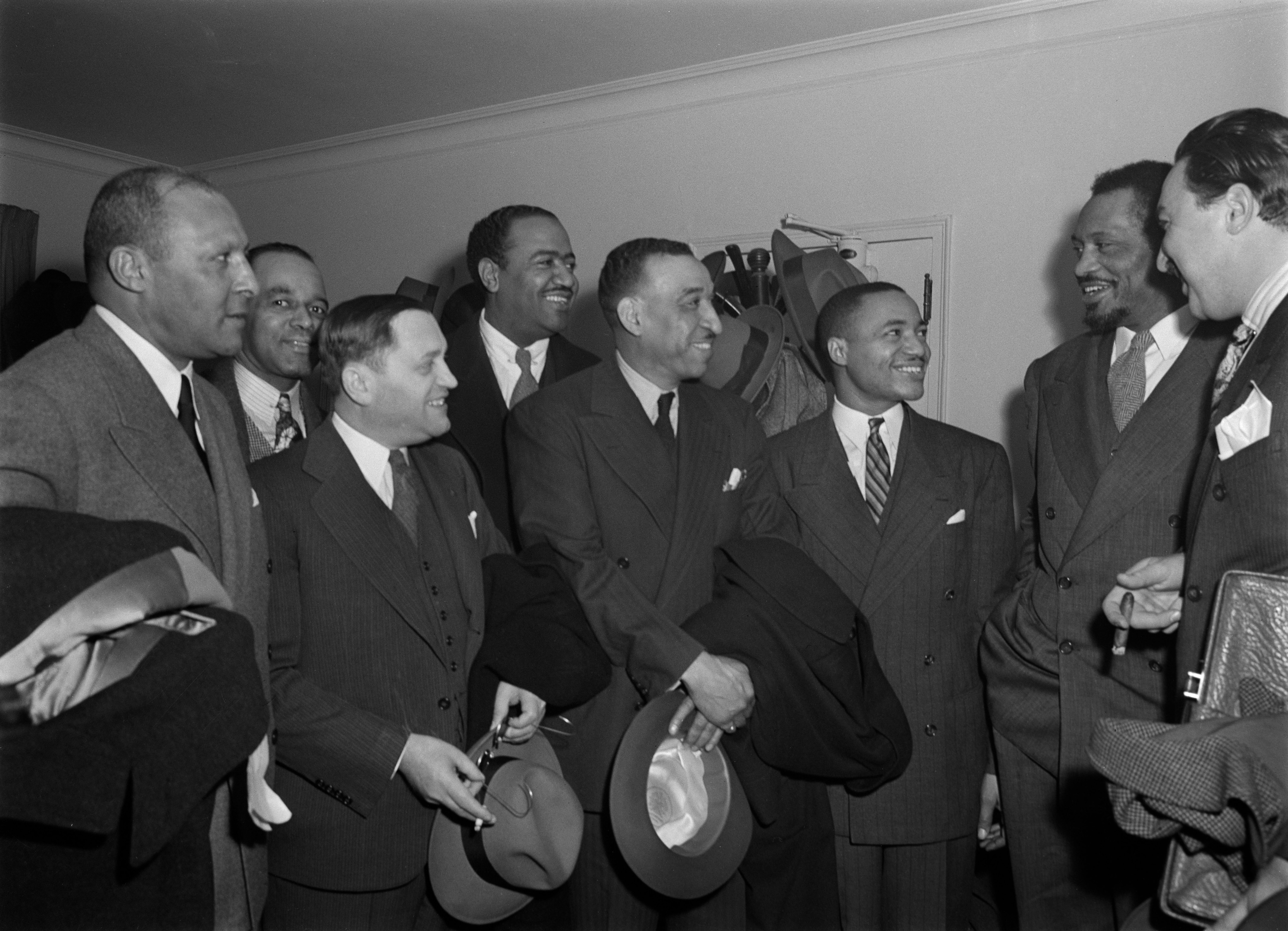
"At the Big League Meeting" December 3, 1943

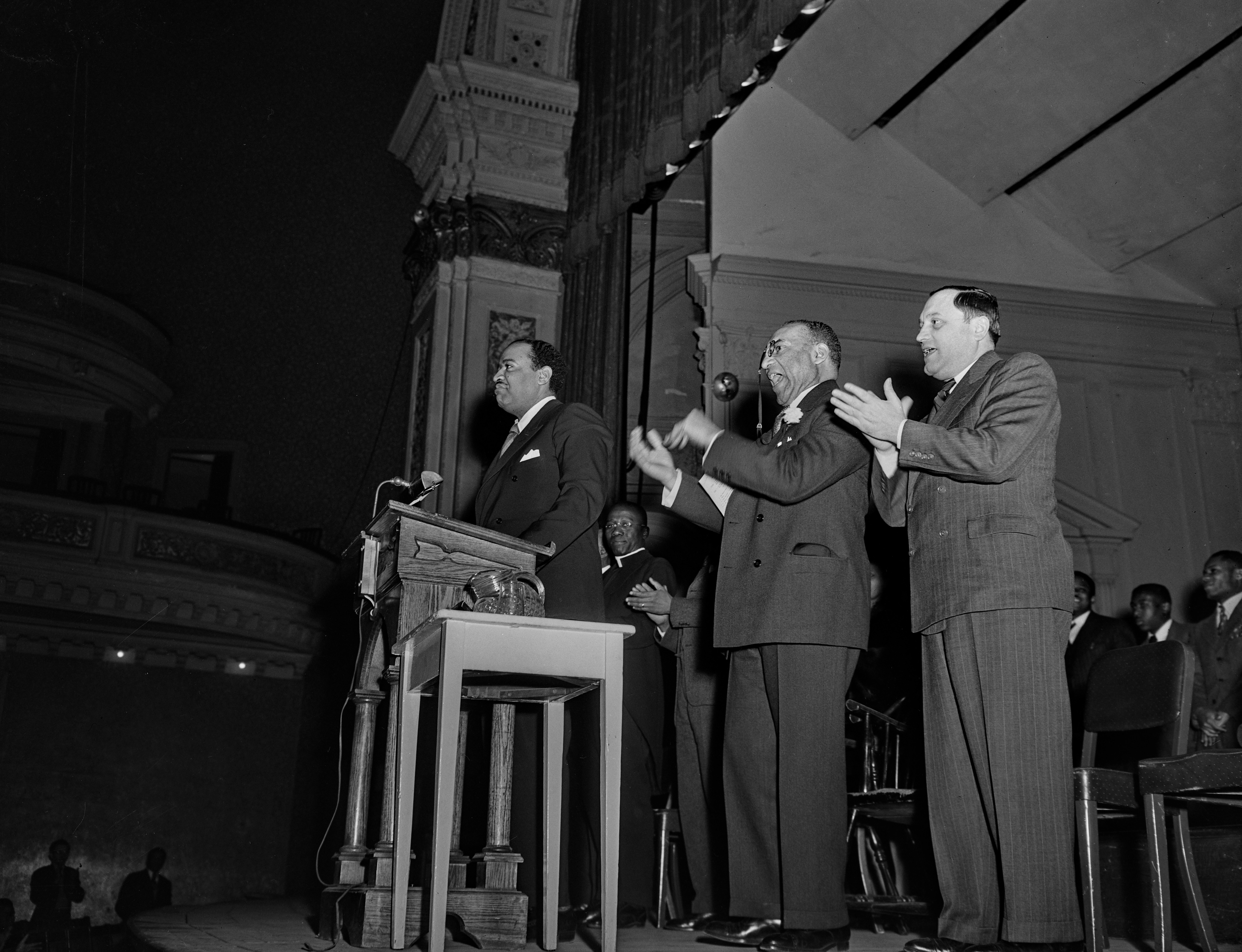
"At Emancipation Celebration" January 2, 1944

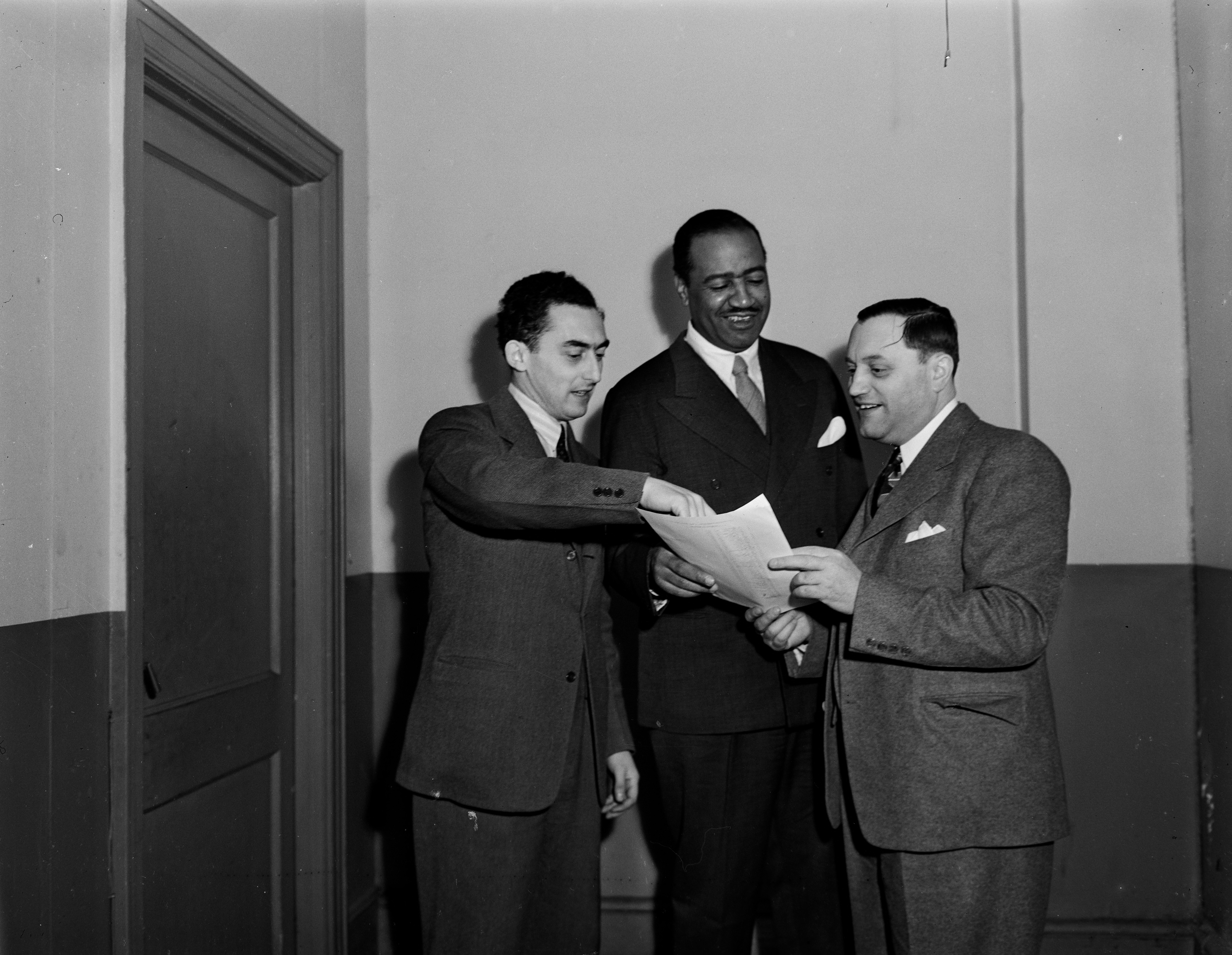
"The Race Is On" March 3, 1944

== Works ==
=== Books ===
- Public Speaking: A Speaker's Guide Book. New York: Workers Library Publishers. November 1942.
- Wall Street on the Warpath. New York: New Century Publishers. October 1947.

=== Articles ===
- "Storm Signals". New Masses. XLVI (3). New York: 9. January 19, 1943.
- "Reader's Forum: USA-USSR Relations". New Masses. XLVII (6). New York: 21. May 11, 1943.
- "New York's City Council". New Masses. XLIX (3). New York: 7. October 19, 1943.
- "The Future of Italy". New Masses. LXIX (4). New York: 15. October 26, 1943.
- "How to Win an Election". New Masses. XLIX (13). New York: 19. December 28, 1943.
- "The Stay-Away Vote". New Masses. LII (13). New York: 3. September 26, 1944.
- "Congrats". New Masses. LXII (9). New York: 23. February 25, 1947.
