= Sue Bailey Thurman =

American writer (1903–1996)

- Thurman in 1953
- Born: Sue Elvie Bailey; August 26, 1903; Pine Bluff, Arkansas
- Died: December 25, 1996 (aged 93); San Francisco, California
- Occupations: Writer, lecturer, historian, civil rights activist
- Years active: 1926–95
- Spouse: Howard Thurman

Sue Bailey Thurman (née Sue Elvie Bailey; August 26, 1903 – December 25, 1996) was an American author, lecturer, historian and civil rights activist. She briefly taught at the Hampton Institute in Virginia, before becoming involved in international work with the YWCA in 1930. During a six-month trip through Asia in the mid-1930s, Thurman became the first African-American woman to have an audience with Mahatma Gandhi.

The meeting with Gandhi inspired Thurman and her husband, theologian Howard Thurman, to promote non-violent resistance as a means of creating social change, bringing it to the attention of a young preacher, Martin Luther King Jr. While she did not actively protest during the Civil Rights Movement, she served as spiritual counselors to many on the front lines, and helped establish the first interracial, non-denominational church in the United States.

Thurman played an active role in establishing international student organizations to help prevent foreign students feeling isolated while studying abroad. She organized one of the first international scholarship programs for African-American women. She studied racism and the effects of prejudice on various people throughout the world, making two round-the-world trips in her lifetime. She wrote books and newspaper articles to preserve black heritage, and initiated the publishing efforts of the National Council of Negro Women (NCNW) by founding the Aframerican Women's Journal. In addition to writing the second ever history of black Californians, in 1958 Thurman published The Historical Cookbook of the American Negro, laced with historical information about black professional women at a time when African Americans had few civil rights. Recognizing that there was little academic interest in black women's history at the time, Thurman used the marketing ploy of food to report on the lives of black women who were not domestics. She participated in international peace and feminist conferences, and in 1945 attended the San Francisco Conference for the founding of the United Nations as part of an unofficial delegation. Thurman also established museums such as the Museum of Afro-American History in Boston in 1963.

Thurman and her husband retired in San Francisco in 1965. She worked with the San Francisco Public Library in 1969 to develop resources for black history of the American West. In 1979 she was honored with a Centennial Award at Spelman College, sharing the recognition with UNESCO director Herschelle Sullivan Challenor. After her husband's death in 1981, Thurman took over the management of the Howard Thurman Educational Trust, which funded research for literary, religious and scientific purposes and assisted in scholarships for black students. On her death in 1996, she left the couple's vast archives to numerous universities.

== Early years ==
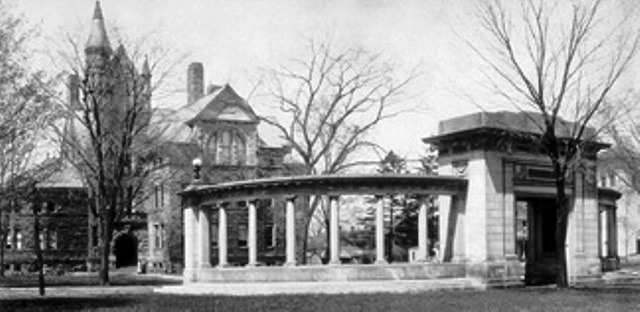
Oberlin College

Sue Elvie Bailey was born on August 26, 1903, in Pine Bluff, Arkansas, to Reverend Isaac and Susie (née Ford) Bailey. She attended primary school at Nannie Burroughs' School for Girls in Washington, D.C. In 1920, she graduated from the college preparatory school, Spelman Seminary (now Spelman College) in Atlanta, Georgia. She continued her education at Oberlin College in Oberlin, Ohio, graduating in 1926 with bachelor's degrees in music and liberal arts. Despite citations that Sue Bailey Thurman was the first black student to earn a music degree from Oberlin, the music program's first black graduate was Harriet Gibbs Marshall in 1889. While a student at Oberlin College, Bailey developed a friendship with Louise Thompson, who would become a central figure in the Harlem Renaissance movement, and encouraged Langston Hughes, inventor of jazz poetry, to read poetry there. She traveled with a quintet giving concerts in Cleveland, New York, and Philadelphia, as well as London and Paris.

== Early career ==
After graduating, Thurman took a post as a music teacher at the Hampton Institute in Virginia, but did not enjoy the work. One of the issues at Hampton was that her friend, Louise Thompson, also a teacher there, had written anonymously to W. E. B. Du Bois, co-founder of the National Association for the Advancement of Colored People (NAACP), complaining about conditions at the college under the predominantly white administration. Although Bailey was suspected of writing the letter after Du Bois published it in the NAACP's journal The Crisis, she did not betray Thompson but instead invited Langston Hughes to Hampton for a poetry reading and moral support. Nevertheless, she left Hampton in 1930 to become a traveling National Secretary for the Student Division of the YWCA. She lectured throughout Europe and established the first World Fellowship Committee of the YWCA. On June 12, 1932, in the dining hall at Lincoln Academy, Kings Mountain, North Carolina, Bailey married Howard W. Thurman (1900–1981), a minister, who would become a social critic, writer and dean of several prominent US universities. At the time of their marriage, he was serving as Dean of Rankin Chapel and Professor of Systematic Theology at Howard University in Washington, D.C.

== Asia ==
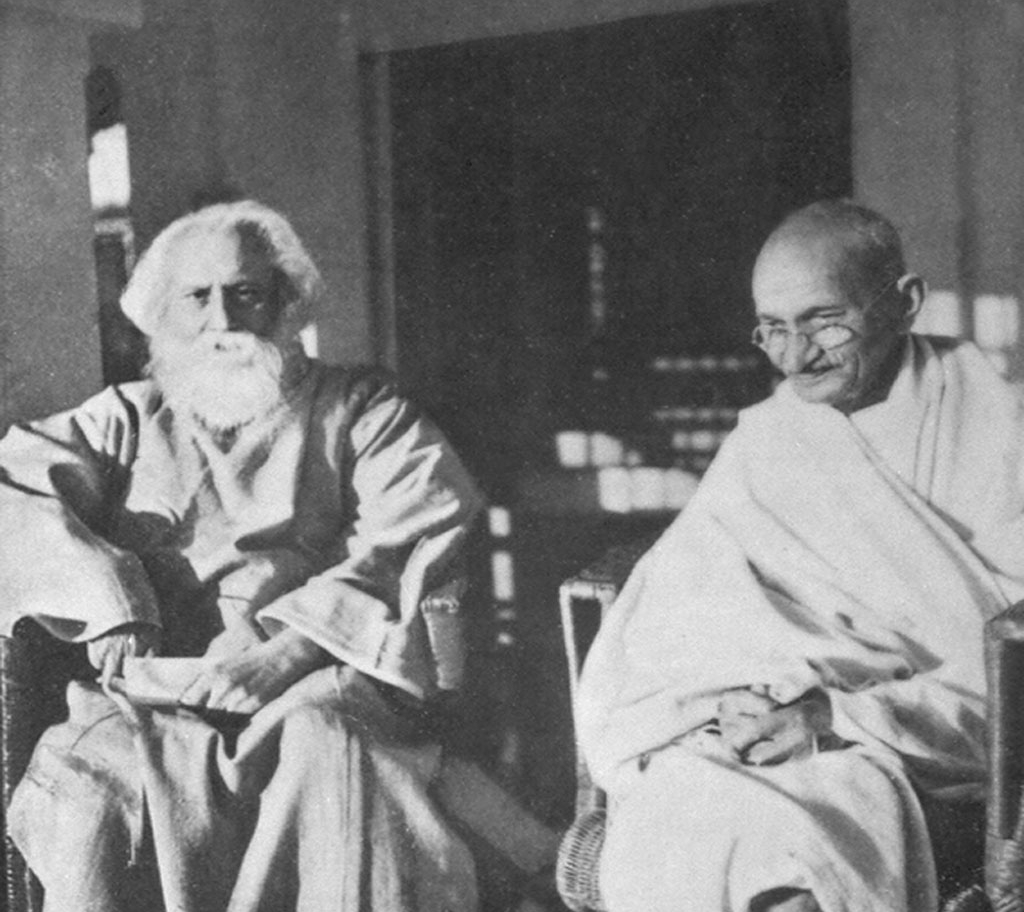
Rabindranath Tagore and Mahatma Gandhi

In 1935, the couple embarked upon a six-month trip through southern Asia, visiting Burma, Ceylon and India, culminating in a "Pilgrimage of Friendship" to the International Student Conference in India. Her husband led the American delegation, lecturing at more than forty universities, while Thurman herself was asked to meet with journalists and students, to discuss race relations and evaluate the parallels between the situation with Indians and the British and the African Americans and white Americans. Initially, Howard had turned down the opportunity and his wife was not included in the offer, but when the trip was finally agreed, both were participants. Thurman was not chosen simply as the wife of Howard Thurman but, in the words of the committee, because she was one of "four persons best able to do this particular job". This decision was remarkable for the period given that black women were often invisible members of society and generally prohibited from authoritative roles in social welfare programs. Thurman lectured during the trip on negro women and the organizations to which they belonged, as well as internationalism and culture. During their meeting with Rabindranath Tagore in Santiniketan she presented a paper "The History of Negro Music", though initially she had been reluctant to discuss slave music. She finally agreed only after Tagore and Gandhi explained that to Asian Christians, negro spirituals were deemed to express the profound faith of people even in bondage and seemed more authentic than western hymns. Thurman both sang and taught songs to local choirs. She also commented on art, having acquired knowledge on the subject during an earlier trip to Mexico.

The couple met with Mahatma Gandhi, becoming the first African Americans to have an audience with him. When Thurman asked him to take his message to the United States, he demurred as his work in India and his personal quest there were not finished. One important aspect of the meeting was a discussion of how non-violent resistance could be used as a means of creating social change. The meeting had a profound effect on the couple, changing the direction of their lives. Though they would remain Christians, the meeting with Gandhi led them to consider establishing a church free of prejudice, transcending racial, social, economic and spiritual boundaries. After they returned to the United States, Howard received a letter from A. J. Muste on behalf of Alfred Fisk who was looking for someone to establish a church in San Francisco which crossed the racial and spiritual divides. Muste was hopeful that Rev. Thurman might know of a divinity student interested in the position. Instead, Howard decided to take up the challenge himself, securing a leave of absence in order to found the church. Thurman went with him bringing their two daughters, as she strongly believed in the cause.

== Mid-career ==
=== Scholarly work and San Francisco ===
Thurman established the Juliette Derricotte Scholarship in the late 1930s, which allowed African-American undergraduate women of high academic achievement to study and travel abroad. The first two recipients of the scholarship were Marian Banfield of Howard University and Anna V. Brown of Oberlin College. Banfield was a goddaughter of Howard Thurman. The following year the recipients of her scholarship were Elizabeth McCree from Boston, who attended Fisk University, and Margaret Bush Wilson of Talladega College.

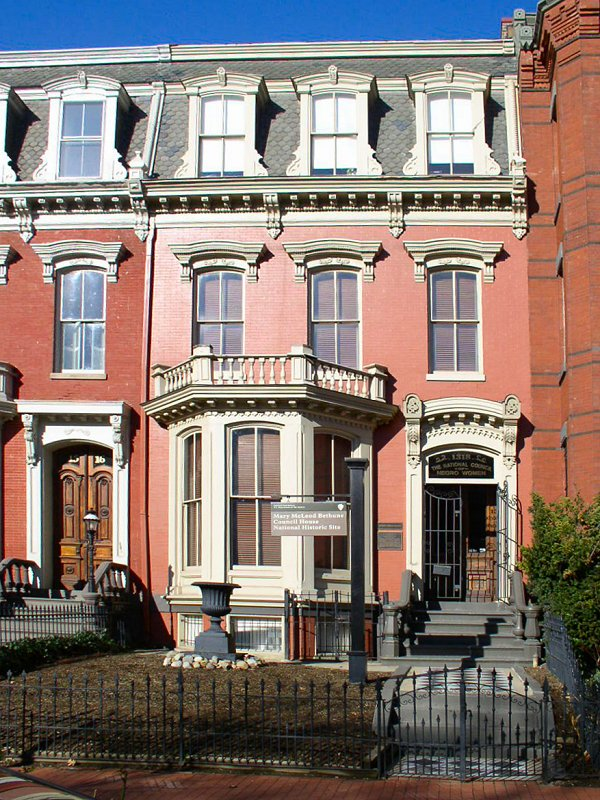
Mary McLeod Bethune Council House

In 1940, Thurman founded the Aframerican Women's Journal, the first publishing vehicle of the National Council of Negro Women (NCNW), which she edited from 1940 until 1944. In 1941, an archive committee was formed to design a plan for collecting works about the achievements of African-American women. Though their plans focused primarily on written records and professional accomplishment and would thus reflect middle-class life, the committee initiated work on collecting historical records of black women. In 1944, Thurman became the committee's chair and her mother donated $1,000 toward creating the National Council of Negro Women's National Library, Archives, and Museum. On June 30, 1946, they held an archive drive, printing notices in newsletters and asking ministers, organizations, librarians and others to help them acquire photographs, books and mementos. They opened the first facility of the library at what is now the Mary McLeod Bethune Council House National Historic Site.

In 1943, Thurman and her husband moved to San Francisco. She wrote several articles about their Asian trip, analyzing information, discussing their meeting with Gandhi and pressing for scholarship exchanges for negro students at Indian universities. It was from the Thurmans and their talks and writings that Martin Luther King Jr. learned of non-violent resistance as a means of social protest. By 1944, the church which they had envisioned after their meeting with Gandhi became a reality when they, along with Fisk, opened the Church for the Fellowship of All Peoples. It was the first interracial, non-denominational church in the United States. While her husband assumed the pastoral duties, Thurman organized forums and lectures for the members to learn about other peoples such as Native Americans, Africans, Asians and their cultures, covering everything from the Jews to the Navajos.

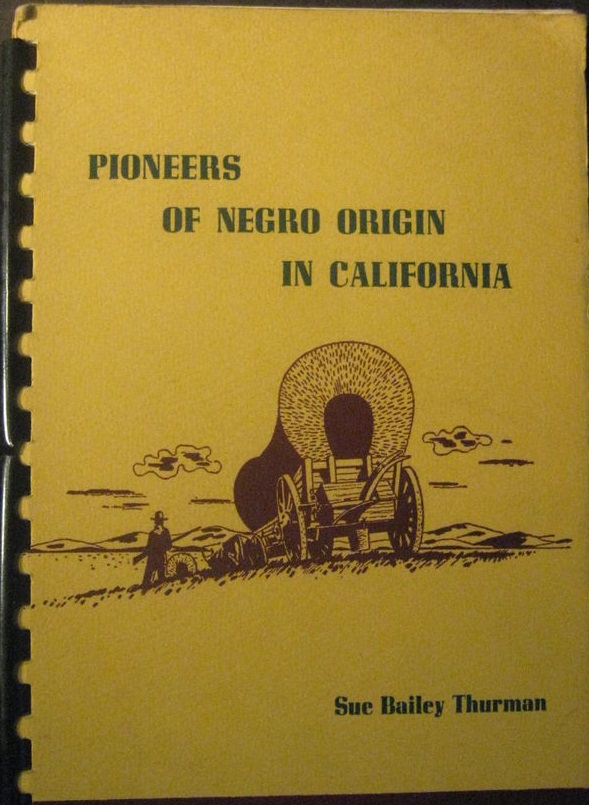
"Pioneers of Negro Origin in California" by Thurman

In 1945, Thurman attended the San Francisco Conference for the founding of the United Nations as part of an unofficial delegation. The official African-American delegation included W. E. B. Du Bois, founder of the NAACP; Walter Francis White, Executive Secretary of the NAACP; and Mary McLeod Bethune founder of the National Council of Negro Women, but Bethune insisted on sending three additional observers from the NCNW, which included Thurman. After the event, Thurman published a report in the Chicago Defender on April 16, 1945, in which she questioned the limited role that people of color played in the proceedings and pointed out that the large populations of developing countries would become a force to be reckoned with. Thurman, as a representative for the NCNW, attended the Primer Congreso Interamericano de Mujeres held in Guatemala City, Guatemala, in 1947. The congress addressed many of the issues she supported such as women's rights, internationalism, and peace initiatives. In 1949, she led a delegation of members from the Church for the Fellowship of All Peoples to Paris for the Fourth Plenary Session of UNESCO.

After researching black history in California, Thurman wrote eight articles for the San Francisco Sun Reporter as part of a series entitled "Pioneers of Negro Origin in California". Using the same title, she published the articles in book form in 1952. It was the second history of black Californians published—the first being The Negro Trail Blazers of California by Delilah L. Beasley in 1919—and filled a gap caused by a lack of academic interest. History in America, at the time, was written about men and almost exclusively about white men. Neither of the women who wrote about the history of blacks in California was a native Californian.

=== Boston ===
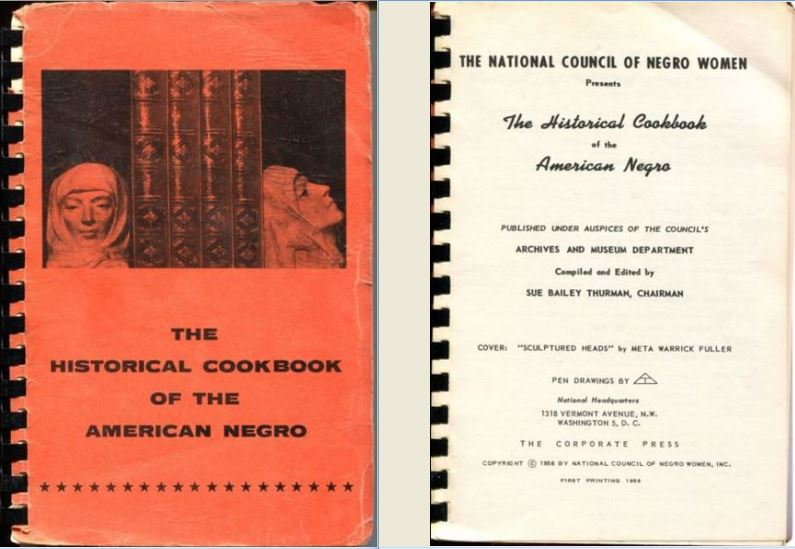
Cookbook by Thurman

In 1953, Howard Thurman became the Dean of the Boston University School of Theology and, after ten years in California, the couple moved to Boston. The move was prompted by the desire to share their ideas of outreach and inclusion in a university setting, though they were aware that the arrival of the first black pastor in a white university would lead to difficulties. From the beginning, Thurman tried to create an inclusive environment, organizing monthly dinners for the Marsh Chapel Choir members and their friends. Shortly after they arrived, a Japanese student committed suicide leaving a note that she had no friends. Not only was she not known well at the university, finding her family to notify them was difficult. In response, Thurman organized the International Student Hostess Committee to keep international students from feeling isolated. By 1965, the committee was serving 500 international students at Boston University.

The Thurmans were at times criticized by those who felt they should be visibly active in the Civil Rights Movement, but they believed their commitment was to addressing the spiritual needs of those who were visible, rather than participating in marches, protests and demonstrations. Among the papers of Martin Luther King Jr. were many letters from people who shared their advocacy of Gandhian nonviolence or directly credited the Thurmans' friendship and spiritual guidance, including Homer A. Jack, who co-founded the Congress of Racial Equality; Lillian Smith, author of the novel Strange Fruit; Glenn E. Smiley, national field secretary of Fellowship of Reconciliation; and King himself.

Thurman continued her writing work in Boston. In 1958, she published The Historical Cookbook of the American Negro, which not only gave recipes but included black history. It retold stories of professional women and history to counter the belief that all black women were maids and domestics at a time when African Americans were excluded from basic civil rights. She recognized that in order to tell their history, a new approach was needed as there was no market for histories of the African Americans. In the preface to her book, she explained she was creating "palatable history", testifying to her shrewd marketing ability.

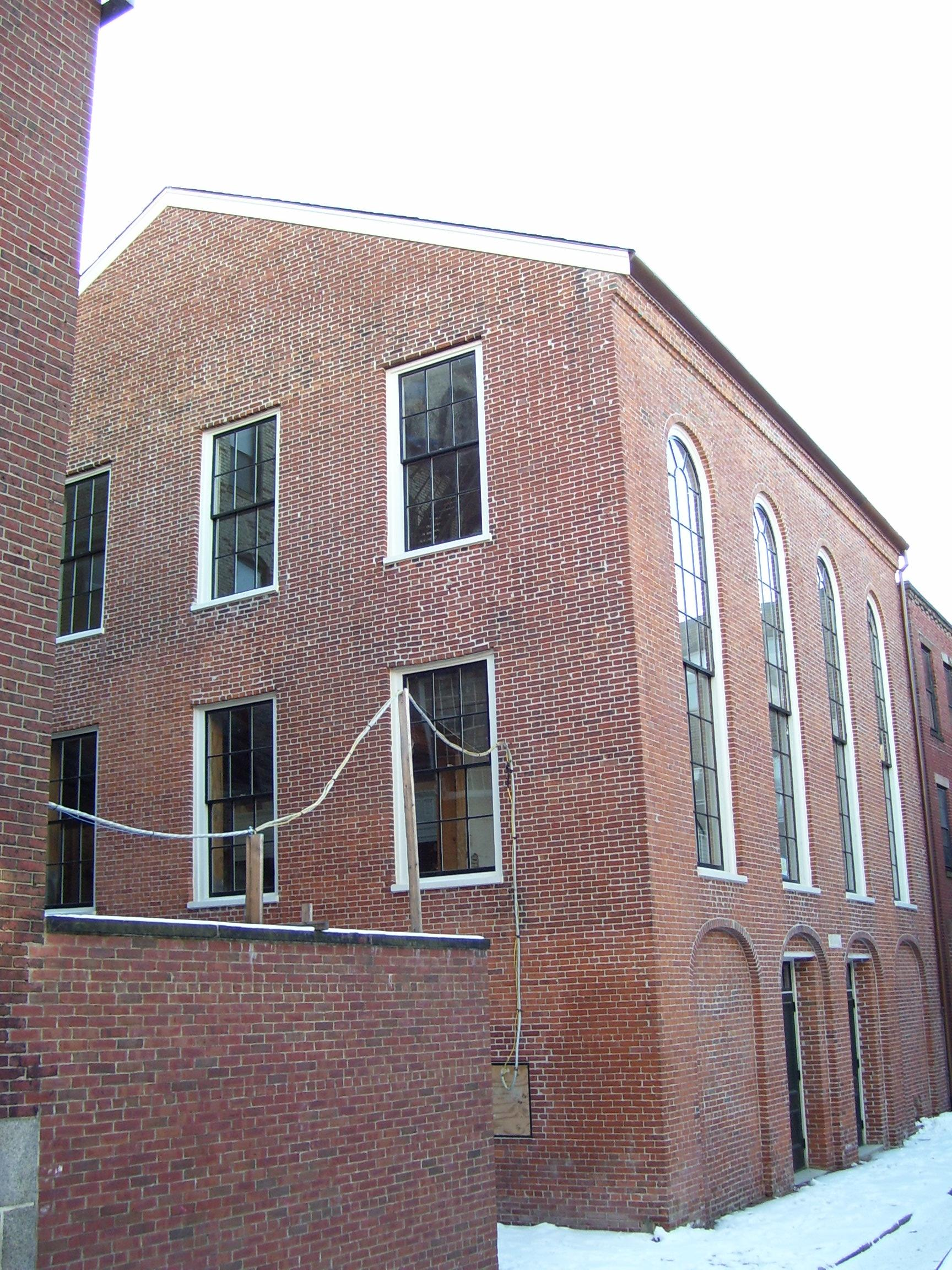
The African Meeting House

During the 1960s, the Thurmans traveled widely, making various trips to study racial barriers that prohibited creation of community. A two-year sabbatical granted from Boston University made their travels possible. In 1962, they journeyed to Saskatchewan, Canada, to meet with tribal leaders about discrimination and in 1963, they embarked on a trip that included Nigeria, Israel, Hawaii, and California. In Nigeria, Howard Thurman lectured at the University of Ibadan. The couple's second round-the-world tour took them to Japan, the Philippines and Egypt.

In 1963, Thurman founded the Museum of Afro-American History in Boston. Interested in history, she had discovered a settlement where free blacks had lived prior to the Civil War and their 1808 African Meeting House, which housed both Boston's first black church and the first segregated public school in the United States. The museum was created to save the site and provide a means to purchase other significant properties for preservation of African-American heritage in the area. Thurman also created a map of important African American historical sites in Boston with the help of her daughter, Anne Chiarenza, which she called "Negro Freedom Trails of Boston". The map highlighted twenty-two points of interest to black history within the city of Boston and was in part created to give black school children a sense that they were part of the history of the city. What is today known as the Black Heritage Trail was adapted from Thurman's original idea.

While in Boston, in 1962, Thurman arranged for the sculptor Meta Warrick Fuller to create a commissioned "freedom plaque" for Livingstone College, of Salisbury, North Carolina. Bailey was an invited speaker at Livingstone in 1963 and at that time, in honor of United Nations Day, she donated a collection of dolls representing the member nations to the college. As far back as the 1930s, Thurman had collected ethnic dolls and given them to universities to promote understanding of cultural differences. In 1967, Livingstone awarded her with an honorary doctorate.

== San Francisco return ==
Howard Thurman took retirement from Boston University in 1965 and the couple moved back to San Francisco. Thurman continued to pursue historic preservation. She worked with the San Francisco Public Library in 1969 to develop resources for black history of the American West. In the 1970s, the couple took a trip to the Pacific basin. They also collaborated with former communist activist Carl Vedro in managing the traveling "Freedom Now" mural by Robert Witt Ames, now housed at the DuSable Black History Museum. In 1979 she was honored with a Centennial Award at Spelman College, sharing the recognition with UNESCO director Herschelle Sullivan Challenor.

After her husband's death, in 1981, Thurman took over the management of the Howard Thurman Educational Trust, which funded research for literary, religious and scientific purposes, endowed scholarships for black students and assisted charitable projects. Thurman was the mother of Anne Spencer Thurman and stepmother to Olive Thurman, her husband's daughter with his first wife. Olive was the first wife of actor Victor Wong.

Thurman died on Christmas Day, 1996, at the San Francisco Zen Buddhist Hospice Center.

== Legacy ==
After her death in 1996, she and Howard's vast archives were donated per their wishes to numerous universities. The largest collection of their documents is housed at Boston University. There are additional collections of their writings and works at Oberlin, Emory University and several other institutions like the National Council of Negro Women's archives in Washington, D.C and libraries in Arkansas named for her mother, Mrs. Susie Ford Bailey. The collection at Emory University includes the correspondence between the Thurmans and Mrs. Bailey, their personal libraries, and nearly one thousand photographs.
