= Howard Thurman House =

Historic house in Florida, United States

- U.S. National Register of Historic Places
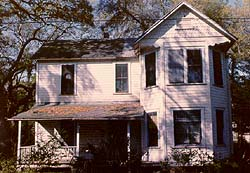

- Location within Volusia County
- Location: Daytona Beach, Florida
- Coordinates: 29°11′54″N 81°1′19″W
- NRHP reference No.: 90000100
- Added to NRHP: February 23, 1990

The Howard Thurman House is the historic home of Howard Thurman in Daytona Beach, Florida, United States. It is located at 614 Whitehall Street. Supporters including Reverend Jefferson P. Rogers, a former student of Thurman's at Howard University and tennis champion and activist Arthur Ashe, worked to preserve the house. It was added to the U.S. National Register of Historic Places on February 23, 1990.

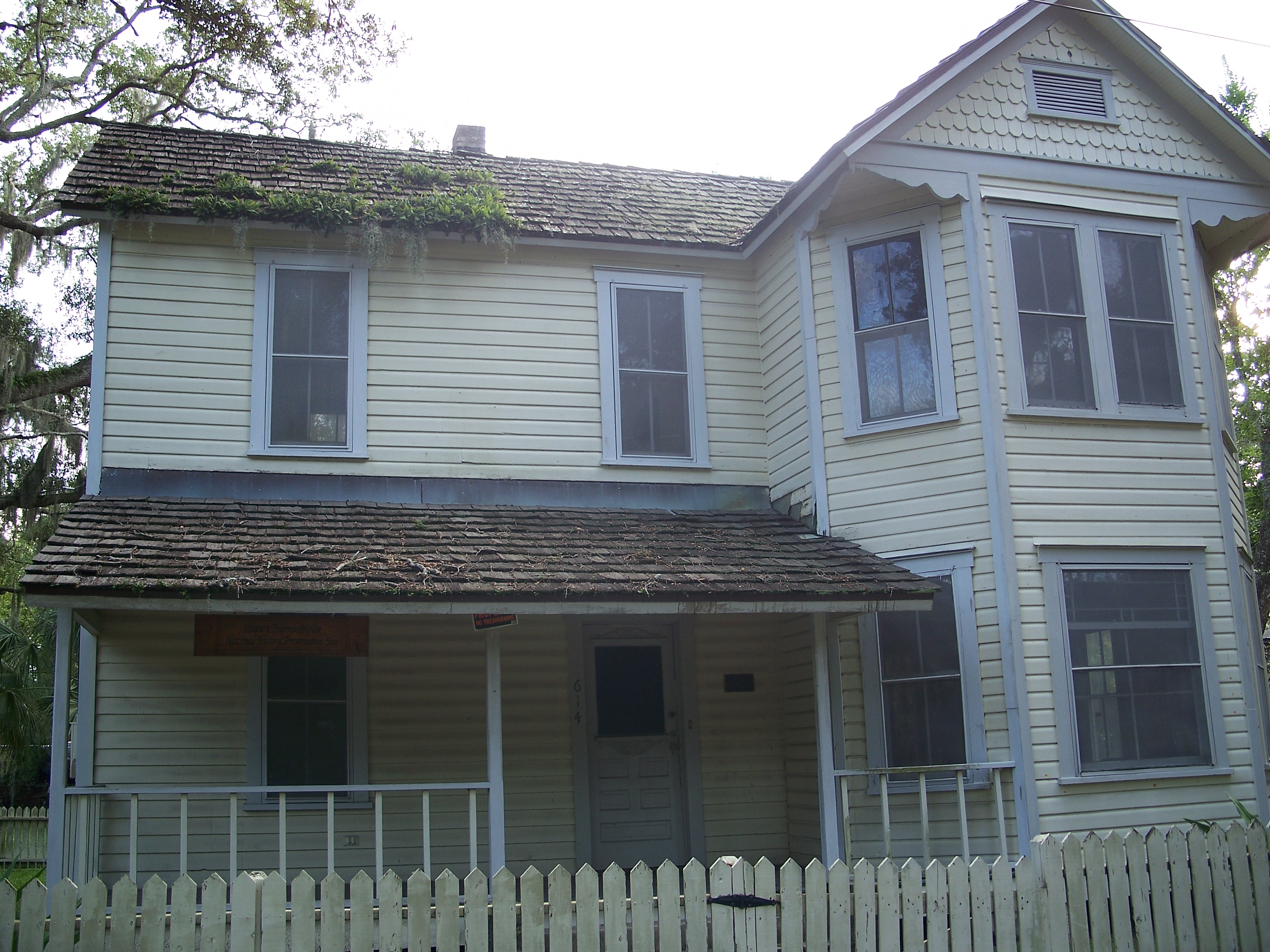

== References and external links ==
- Volusia County listings at National Register of Historic Places
- Florida's Office of Cultural and Historical Programs
  - Volusia County listings
  - Howard Thurman Historic Home
  - Great Floridians of Daytona Beach
