= Jesus and the Disinherited =

1949 book by Howard Thurman

- First edition
- Author: Howard Thurman
- Language: English
- Subject: Jesus Christ, Biblical sociology, Christian theology
- Publisher: Abingdon-Cokesbury Press, Beacon Press
- Publication date: 1949, 2012
- Publication place: United States
- Media type: Book
- Pages: 112
- ISBN: 0807010294

Jesus and the Disinherited is a 1949 book by African-American minister, theologian, and civil rights leader Howard Thurman.

In the book, Thurman interprets the teachings of Jesus through the experience of the oppressed and discusses nonviolent responses to oppression. The book developed out of a series of lectures that Thurman presented at Samuel Huston College in Austin, Texas, in April 1948."

== Background ==
The ideas encapsulated in the book had been developing for a number of years. In February 1932, Thurman gave an address in Atlanta on “The Kind of Religion the Negro Needs in Times Like These,” which was an early version of what would become “Good News for the Underprivileged.” In the summer of 1935, he delivered “Good News for the Underprivileged” at the Annual Convocation Lecture on Preaching at Boston University. The address was printed in the summer 1935 issue of Religion and Life, and forms the basis of Jesus and the Disinherited.

He would deliver “Christianity and the Underprivileged” again in February 1937 at Union Church in Berea, Kentucky, and at the University of Kentucky in Lexington. On December 10, 1937, Thurman delivered the address “The Significance of Jesus to the Disinherited” as the leader of Religious Emphasis Week at A&T College of North Carolina in Greensboro. A number of other addresses on the theme would take place in 1938, 1939, 1942, and 1947, with the lectures that became the book occurring April 11–16, 1948 as the Mary L. Smith Memorial Lectures at Samuel Huston College in Austin, Texas. Thurman continued to speak on the theme, delivering addresses in 1949, 1951, 1952, 1957, and in 1959 delivered a 12-part sermon series in the Boston University's Marsh Chapel on "Jesus and the Disinherited."

== Content ==
- "Jesus - An Interpretation"

Chapter 1 is Thurman’s interpretation of Jesus. Thurman analyzes Jesus as a “religious subject rather than a religious object” (5). He continues to say that one must consider the society Jesus had lived in and how that society might shed light on the relationship between Jesus’ teachings and the disinherited and/or underprivileged. Specifically, Thurman emphasizes the fact that “Jesus was a poor Jew” (7). Thurman explains the options of survival Jesus witnessed his people living in under the oppression of the Roman Empire. Thurman outlines three options: two forms of non-resistance and one form of resistance. The nonresistance options were imitation, in which Thurman ascribes to the Sadducees, or isolation, which Thurman ascribes to the Pharisees. The third alternative Thurman includes is armed resistance, which he ascribes to the Zealots. Because this was the environment Jesus had lived in, Thurman suggests that the religion of Jesus should be considered as a “technique of survival for the oppressed” (18).

- "Fear"

In Chapter 2, Thurman clarifies that within this section he will refer to a fear that is not of death, but is rather a “deep humiliation rising from dying without benefit of cause or purpose” (28). He continues on to contextualize this fear as a “safety device with which the oppressed surround themselves in order to give some measure of protection” whether that protection be for their own mental health or from oppressors (30). One product of fear that Thurman emphasizes is segregation. He explains segregation as being an option only between two groups of unequal amounts of control and/or power. Later, he mentions Jim Crow Laws as an example of segregation. Thurman determines that segregation, when accepted as normal circumstance, removes social protection from the group of lesser power. In this acceptance, “there is but a step from being despised to despising oneself” (33). The act of utilizing fear as a means for protection thus becomes “death for the self” (35). Thurman concludes that the religion of Jesus addresses fear by contributing to the value of the individual. The contribution is that “God is mindful of the individual” and that individuals “are God’s children” (39).

- "Deception"

In Chapter 3, Thurman discusses deception as an ethical and spiritual dilemma. He defines three ways of morally evaluating the fact that the disinherited resort to deception: acceptance, compromise, and complete sincerity.

In regards to acceptance, Thurman claims that some do not think the disinherited have any other choice. In this reality, deception is a reflex of survival and circumstance. Because there appears to be no other alternative, the deception continues without moral hesitation. Thurman says that this option “tends to destroy whatever sense of ethical values the individual has” (53).

The second alternative grants that there is a moral choice in whether or not to deceive but regard the choice as a compromise forced by their situation. The disinherited choose life over truth.

The third alternative, complete sincerity, is what Thurman believes Jesus offers the disinherited and oppressed. Jesus chooses “to be simply, directly truthful, whatever may be the cost in life, limb, or security” (60). Complete sincerity revokes the power of the oppressors by removing “[the edge] from the sense of prerogative and from the status of upon which the impregnability of their position rests” (62). Thurman concludes the chapter by describing man’s relationship with God to be on the same level and significance as man’s relationship to man; in order to be sincere and true to God, one must be the same to other humans.

- "Hate"

Chapter 4 is centered on the role of hatred in the lives of the oppressed. Thurman offers an “anatomy of hate,” as a product of groups without genuine fellowship. One of the main factors borne of the lack of fellowship, Thurman emphasizes, is bitterness “made possible by sustained resentment” (69). Thurman considers hate as the means by which the disinherited and the oppressed justify moral disintegration. Because hate breaks down one’s moral and ethical values, Thurman concludes that Jesus rejected hatred. In that rejection, Jesus offers the disinherited the only option: love.

- "Love"

In Chapter 5, Thurman discusses Jesus’ proclamation to love one’s neighbor and one’s enemy. Thurman especially considers the concept of loving one’s enemy and divides “enemy” into three different categories. The first category is the personal enemy; Thurman defines this as one who at some point was a part of the intimate group and was perhaps at some point loved but is not loved anymore. Loving this type of enemy is an act of “reconciliation, the will to re-establish a relationship” (82).

The second category of enemy recognizes those who have committed acts of betrayal to a person or to a people, and Thurman names the tax collectors as an example of this type of enemy in Jesus’ society. To love this type of enemy is to shed all bitterness one may have harbored from the social betrayal and “to recognize some deep respect and reverence for their persons” (84). Thurman explains this is not loving what the enemy does, but rather loving the enemy because they are a child of God.

Finally, Thurman addresses the third category of enemy: the oppressor. Thurman names Rome as an example of this enemy, particularly within the context of Romans oppressing the Jewish people. This type of enemy is an enemy not just on a religious basis, but political as well. The ability to love this enemy, Thurman explains, is founded in the ability to strip the oppressor of their worldly titles; thus, the Roman is not a Roman, but a person, and more specifically, that person is a child of God. This method allows both the enemy and the neighbor to emerge as “two human spirits that had found a mutual, though individual, validation” (85).

== Influence ==
In his biography of Martin Luther King Jr., the author Lerone Bennett Jr. notes that King studied Thurman's Jesus and the Disinherited during the Montgomery bus boycott.
