= I Will Light Candles This Christmas =

Poem by Howard Thurman

"I Will Light Candles This Christmas" is a poem by Howard Thurman, who was a prominent African American author, theologian, educator, and civil rights leader.

The poem appeared in a broadside of the same name around 1950. It was printed in Thurman's 1953 book, Meditations of the Heart, and again in his 1973 meditations booklet, The Mood of Christmas.

The verse has been set to music by British composer and songwriter Adrian Payne, both as a song and as a choral (SATB) piece. The choral version was first performed by Epsom Choral Society in December 2007. An arrangement for school choirs, that can be performed in one or two parts with piano accompaniment, was first performed in December 2010.
