= Howard Thurman =

American theologian, author, educator, and civil rights leader (1899–1981)

The Reverend Howard Thurman
- Thurman at Howard University (1932–1944)
- Born: Howard Washington Thurman; November 18, 1899; Daytona Beach, Florida, United States
- Died: April 10, 1981 (aged 81); San Francisco, California, United States
- Education: Morehouse College; Colgate Rochester Crozer Divinity School
- Occupations: Minister, theologian, author, dean
- Organization(s): Howard University; Church for the Fellowship of All Peoples; Boston University
- Notable work: Jesus and the Disinherited (1949)
- Spouse: Sue Bailey

Howard Washington Thurman (November 18, 1899 – April 10, 1981) was an American author, philosopher, minister, theologian, Christian mystic, educator, and civil rights leader.

As a prominent religious figure, Thurman played a leading role in many social justice movements and organizations of the twentieth century. His theology of radical nonviolence influenced and shaped a generation of civil rights activists, and he was a key mentor to leaders within the civil rights movement, including Martin Luther King Jr.

Thurman served as dean of Rankin Chapel at Howard University from 1932 to 1944 and as dean of Marsh Chapel at Boston University from 1953 to 1965. In 1944, he co-founded, along with Alfred Fisk, the first major interracial, interdenominational church in the United States.

== Biography ==
=== Early life and education ===
Howard Thurman was born in 1899 in Florida in Daytona Beach. He spent most of his childhood in Daytona, Florida, where his family lived in Waycross, one of Daytona's three all-black communities.

He was profoundly influenced by his maternal grandmother, Nancy Ambrose, who had been enslaved on a plantation in Madison County, Florida. Nancy Ambrose and Thurman's mother, Alice, were members of Mount Bethel Baptist Church in Waycross and were women of deep Christian faith.

Thurman's father, Saul Thurman, died of pneumonia when Howard Thurman was seven years old. After completing eighth grade, Thurman attended the Florida Baptist Academy in Jacksonville, Florida. Located 100 mi (160 km) from Daytona, it was one of only three high schools for African Americans in Florida at the time.

In 1923, Thurman graduated from Morehouse College as valedictorian. In 1925, he was ordained as a Baptist minister at First Baptist Church of Roanoke, Virginia, while still a student at Rochester Theological Seminary (now Colgate Rochester Crozer Divinity School). He graduated from Rochester Theological Seminary in May 1926 as valedictorian.

From June 1926 until the fall of 1928, Thurman served as pastor of Mount Zion Baptist Church in Oberlin, Ohio. In the fall of 1928, he moved to Atlanta, Georgia, where he had a joint appointment to Morehouse College and Spelman College in philosophy and religion. During the spring semester of 1929, Thurman pursued further study as a special student at Haverford College with Rufus Jones, a noted Quaker philosopher and mystic.

=== Career ===
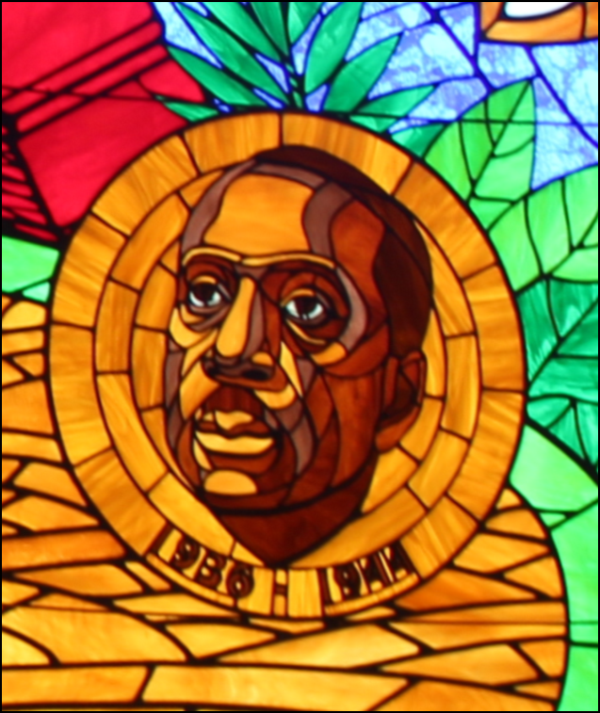
Detail from a stained glass window featuring Howard Thurman at Howard University's Andrew Rankin Memorial Chapel

Thurman was selected as the first dean of Rankin Chapel at Howard University in the District of Columbia in 1932. He served there from 1932 to 1944. He also served on the faculty of the Howard University School of Divinity.

Thurman traveled broadly, heading Christian missions and meeting with world figures. In 1935-36 he led a six-month delegation of African-Americans invited to India for meetings. At Bardoli they spoke with Mahatma Gandhi, who asked "persistent, pragmatic questions" about the Black American community and its struggles. Training for satyagraha was discussed, its difficulties in the extreme addressed.

When Thurman asked Gandhi what message he should take back to the United States, Gandhi said he regretted not having made nonviolence more visible as a practice worldwide and remarked "It may be through the Negroes that the unadulterated message of nonviolence will be delivered to the world".

In 1944, Thurman left his tenured position at Howard to help the Fellowship of Reconciliation establish the Church for the Fellowship of All Peoples also known as The Fellowship Church in San Francisco. He served as co-pastor with a white minister, Alfred Fisk. Many of their congregants were African Americans who had migrated to San Francisco from Oklahoma, Texas, and Arkansas for jobs in the defense industry. The church helped create a new community for many in San Francisco.

Thurman was invited to Boston University in 1953, where he became the dean of Marsh Chapel (1953–1965). He was the first black dean of a chapel at a majority-white university or college in the United States. In addition, he served on the faculty of Boston University School of Theology. Thurman was also active and well known in the Boston community, where he influenced many leaders. Thurman was the minister delivering the sermon at Marsh Chapel on Good Friday April 20, 1962; the famous Good Friday double-blind psychedelic experiment by Walter Pahnke using psilocybin to assess whether a religious environment influenced a mystical experience.

After leaving Boston University in 1965, Thurman continued his ministry as chairman of the board and director of the Howard Thurman Educational Trust in San Francisco. He received an honorary Doctor of Divinity degree from BU in 1967.

Thurman and his wife collaborated with former communist activist Carl Vedro in managing the traveling "Freedom Now" mural by Robert Witt Ames, now housed at the DuSable Black History Museum.

Thurman was a prolific author, writing twenty books on theology, religion, and philosophy. The most famous of his works, Jesus and the Disinherited (1949), deeply influenced Martin Luther King Jr. and other leaders, both black and white, of the modern Civil Rights Movement.

Thurman had been a classmate and friend of King's father at Morehouse. King visited Thurman while he attended BU, and Thurman in turn mentored his former classmate's son and his friends. He served as spiritual advisor to King, Sherwood Eddy, James Farmer, A. J. Muste, and Pauli Murray. At BU, Thurman also taught Reb Zalman Schachter-Shalomi, who cited Thurman as among the teachers who first compelled him to explore mystical trends beyond Judaism.

=== Death ===
Howard Thurman died due to a lingering illness on April 10, 1981, in San Francisco, California. He was 81 years old.

== Personal life ==
Thurman married Katie Kelley on June 11, 1926, less than a month after graduating from seminary. Katie was a 1918 graduate of the Teacher's Course at Spelman Seminary (renamed Spelman College in 1924). Their daughter Olive was born in October 1927. Katie died in December 1930 of tuberculosis, which she had probably contracted during her anti-tuberculosis work.

On June 12, 1932, Thurman married Sue Bailey, whom he had met while at Morehouse, when Sue was a student at Spelman. Their daughter Anne was born in October 1933. Sue Bailey Thurman was an author, lecturer, historian, civil rights activist, and founder of the Aframerican Women's Journal. She died in 1996.

== Honors and legacy ==
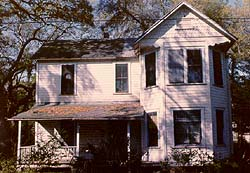
Howard Thurman House in Daytona Beach, Florida

In 1935, Thurman received an honorary doctorate from his alma mater, Morehouse. Ebony Magazine at one point called Thurman one of the 50 most important figures in African-American history. In 1953, Life rated Thurman among the twelve most important religious leaders in the United States. Thurman was named honorary Canon of the Cathedral of St. John the Divine, New York City, in 1974.

In 1986, Dean Emeritus George K. Makechnie founded the Howard Thurman Center at Boston University to preserve and share the legacy of Howard Thurman. In 2020, the Howard Thurman Center for Common Ground moved to a larger space occupying two floors in the Peter Fuller Building at 808 Commonwealth Avenue. The Howard Gotlieb Archival Research Center at Boston University holds the Howard Thurman Papers and the Sue Bailey Thurman Papers, where they are catalogued and available to researchers.

The Howard Thurman Papers Project was founded in 1992. The Project's mission is to preserve and promote Thurman's vast documentary record, which spans 63 years and consists of approximately 58,000 items of correspondence, sermons, unpublished writings, and speeches. The Howard Thurman Papers Project is located at Boston University School of Theology and launched a freely available digital edition of the published volumes in early 2025.

Howard University School of Divinity named their chapel the Thurman Chapel in memory of Howard Thurman.

Howard Thurman's poem 'I Will Light Candles This Christmas' has been set to music by British composer and songwriter Adrian Payne, both as a song and as a choral (SATB) piece. The choral version was first performed by Epsom Choral Society in December 2007. An arrangement for school choirs, which can be performed in one or two parts with piano accompaniment, was first performed in December 2010.

== Bibliography ==
=== Books ===
- The Greatest of These (1944)
- Deep River: Reflections on the Religious Insight of Certain of the Negro Spirituals (1945) [also published as The Negro Spiritual Speaks of Life and Death (same year)]
- Meditation for Apostles of Sensitiveness (1948)
- Jesus and the Disinherited (1949)
- Deep is the Hunger: Meditations for Apostles of Sensitiveness (1951)
- Christmas Is the Season of Affirmation (1951)
- Meditations of the Heart (1953)
- The Creative Encounter: An Interpretation of Religion and the Social Witness (1954)
- The Growing Edge (1956)
- Footprints of a Dream: The Story of the Church for the Fellowship of All Peoples (1959)
- Mysticism and the Experience of Love (1961)
- The Inward Journey: Meditations on the Spiritual Quest (1961)
- Temptations of Jesus: Five Sermons Given By Dean Howard Thurman in Marsh Chapel, Boston University, 1962 (1962)
- Disciplines of the Spirit (1963)
- The Luminous Darkness: A Personal Interpretation of the Anatomy of Segregation and the Ground of Hope (1965)
- The Centering Moment (1969)
- The Search for Common Ground (1971)
- The Mood of Christmas (1973)
- A Track to the Water's Edge: The Olive Schreiner Reader (1973)
- The First Footprints (1975)
- With Head and Heart: The Autobiography of Howard Thurman (1979)
- For the Inward Journey: The Writings of Howard Thurman (1984) (selected by Anne Spencer Thurman)

=== Edited collections ===
- Fluker, Walter Earl; et al., eds. The Papers of Howard Washington Thurman, Vol. 1: My People Need Me, June 1918-March 1936. Columbia: Univ. of South Carolina Press, 2009.
- Fluker, Walter Earl; et al., eds. The Papers of Howard Washington Thurman, Vol. 2: Christian, Who Calls Me Christian? April 1936-August 1943. Columbia: Univ. of South Carolina Press, 2012.
- Fluker, Walter Earl; Eisenstadt, Peter; and Glick, Silvia P., eds. The Papers of Howard Washington Thurman, Vol. 3: The Bold Adventure, September 1943-May 1949. Columbia: Univ. of South Carolina Press, 2015.
- Fluker, Walter Earl; et al., eds. The Papers of Howard Washington Thurman, Vol. 4: The Soundless Passion of a Single Mind, June 1949-December 1962. Columbia: Univ. of South Carolina Press, 2017.
- Fluker, Walter Earl; et al., eds. The Papers of Howard Washington Thurman, Vol. 5: The Wider Ministry, January 1963–April 1981. Columbia: Univ. of South Carolina Press, 2019.
- Fluker, Walter Earl and Tumber, Catherine, eds. A Strange Freedom: The Best of Howard Thurman on Religious Experience and Public Life. Boston: Beacon Press, 1998.
- Smith, Jr., Luther E. Howard Thurman: Essential Writings. Maryknoll, N.Y.: Orbis Books, 2006.
- Werntz, Myles, ed. Nothing Can Separate Us: Healing for Souls and Nations. Walden, N.Y.: Plough Publishing House, 2026.
