= Church for the Fellowship of All Peoples =

Religious organization

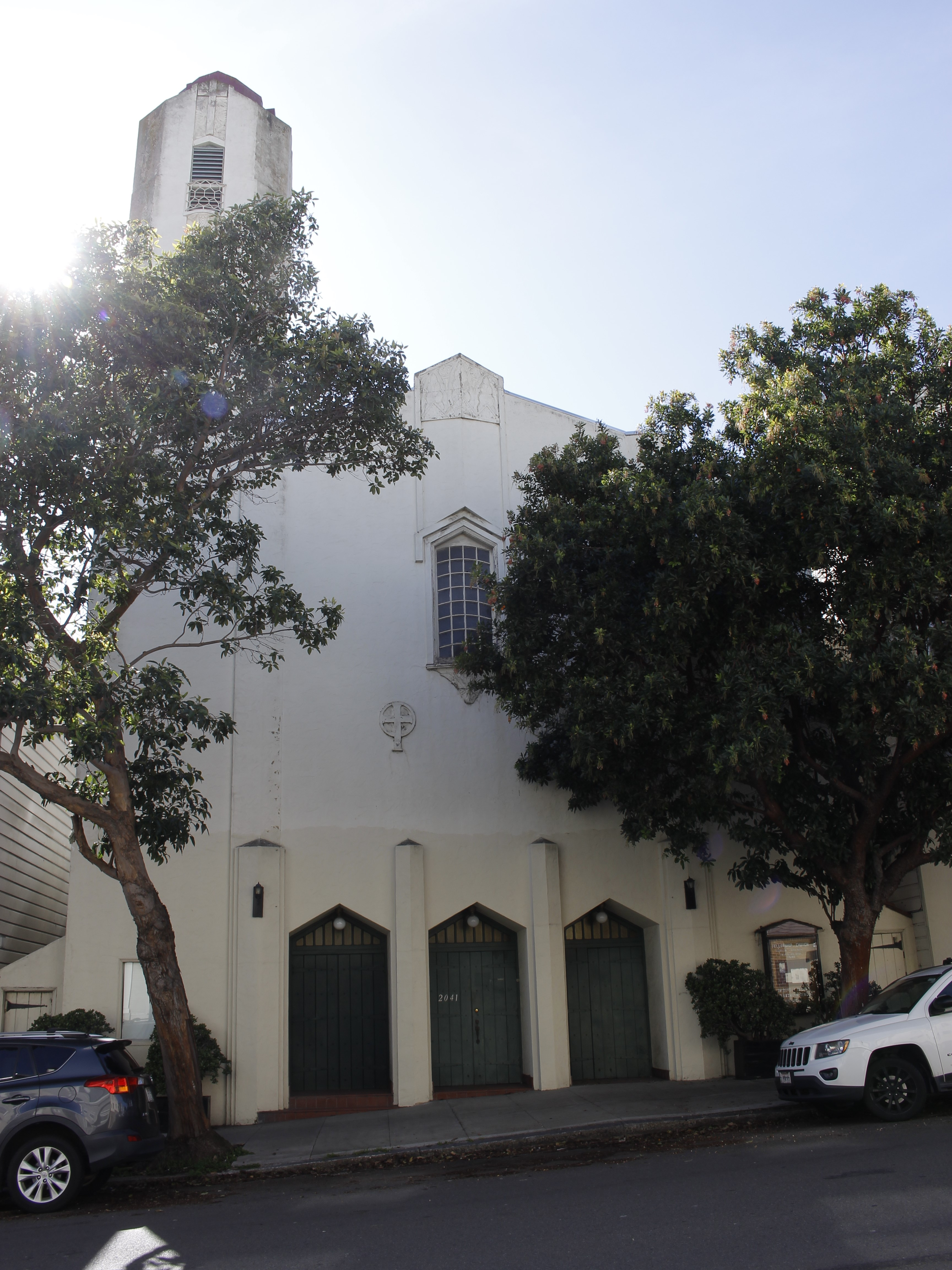
- 2041 Larkin Street in March 2024
- Location: San Francisco, California, United States
- Website: www.fellowshipsf.org

History
- Founded: 1944
- Founder: Howard Thurman

The Church for the Fellowship of All Peoples, sometimes called Fellowship Church, is an intercultural, interracial, interfaith and interdenominational organization dedicated to "personal empowerment and social transformation through an ever deepening relationship with the Spirit of God in All Life." It was founded in 1944 in San Francisco, California, making it the first racially integrated, intercultural church in the nation. Its founding co-pastor was the African-American mystic theologian Howard Thurman. In 2023, the church location at 2041 Larkin Street was listed as a San Francisco designated landmark, for the history it has contributed to the city.

== History ==
In 1944, Baptist minister Howard Thurman left his tenured position at Howard University to help the Fellowship of Reconciliation establish the Church for the Fellowship of All Peoples in San Francisco. It was the first racially integrated, intercultural church in the United States. He served as co-pastor with a white minister, Dr. Alfred Fisk. Many of their congregation were African Americans who had migrated to San Francisco from Oklahoma, Texas and Arkansas for jobs in the defense industry. The church helped create a new community for many in San Francisco.

The current presiding minister is the Rev. Dorsey Blake, the co-minister is Kathryn Benton. In the recent past, there were other popular associate ministers. The congregation presently consists of a small number of active supporters, many of whom are longtime members. The off-white stucco façade is embellished by three street-level arched inset doors, and crowned with a leaning belltower. Below the sanctuary at street level is Thurman Hall, named after Dr. Thurman, where meetings, plays, lectures, and music are performed. A Muslim imam may lead a service and sermons may involve Hinduism or Judaism.

Neighbors are familiar with the church's use as a polling place, and the leaning bell tower. Neighbors have held meetings at the church, as have other groups. In the 1980s, Fellowship Theater Guild revitalized the church's longtime involvement with the arts. Productions have included "I'm Not Rappaport", "LUV", "Member of the Wedding", and "An Evening with Martin and Langston" with Danny Glover appearing as Langston Hughes and Felix Justice as Martin Luther King Jr.

In 2005, Justice returned in Jesus Hopped the 'A' Train, and in 2006 local jazz singer Kim Nalley starred as the legendary Billie Holiday in the West Coast premiere of Lady Day in Love." In the summer of 2007, the Church began hosting the Howard Thurman Forum Series of free lectures in its building.

== Howard Thurman Award ==
Each October at the Church's annual Convocation (open to the public), the Howard Thurman Award honors an exceptional contributor to community and social justice. Past recipients include Congresswoman Barbara Lee of California's 9th District; Rev. Nelson Johnson and Joyce Johnson of Greensboro, North Carolina; and in 2008, Chaplain James Yee, the former United States Army chaplain who served as the Muslim chaplain for the U.S. prison camp in Guantanamo Bay, Cuba.
