= 1939 New York City Council election =

- November 7, 1939

All seats to the New York City Council
	Majority party	Minority party	Third party
Party	Democratic	American Labor	Republican
Seats before	13	5	3
Seats won	14	2	2
	Fourth party	Fifth party
Party	Fusion	Independent
Seats before	3
Seats won	2	1
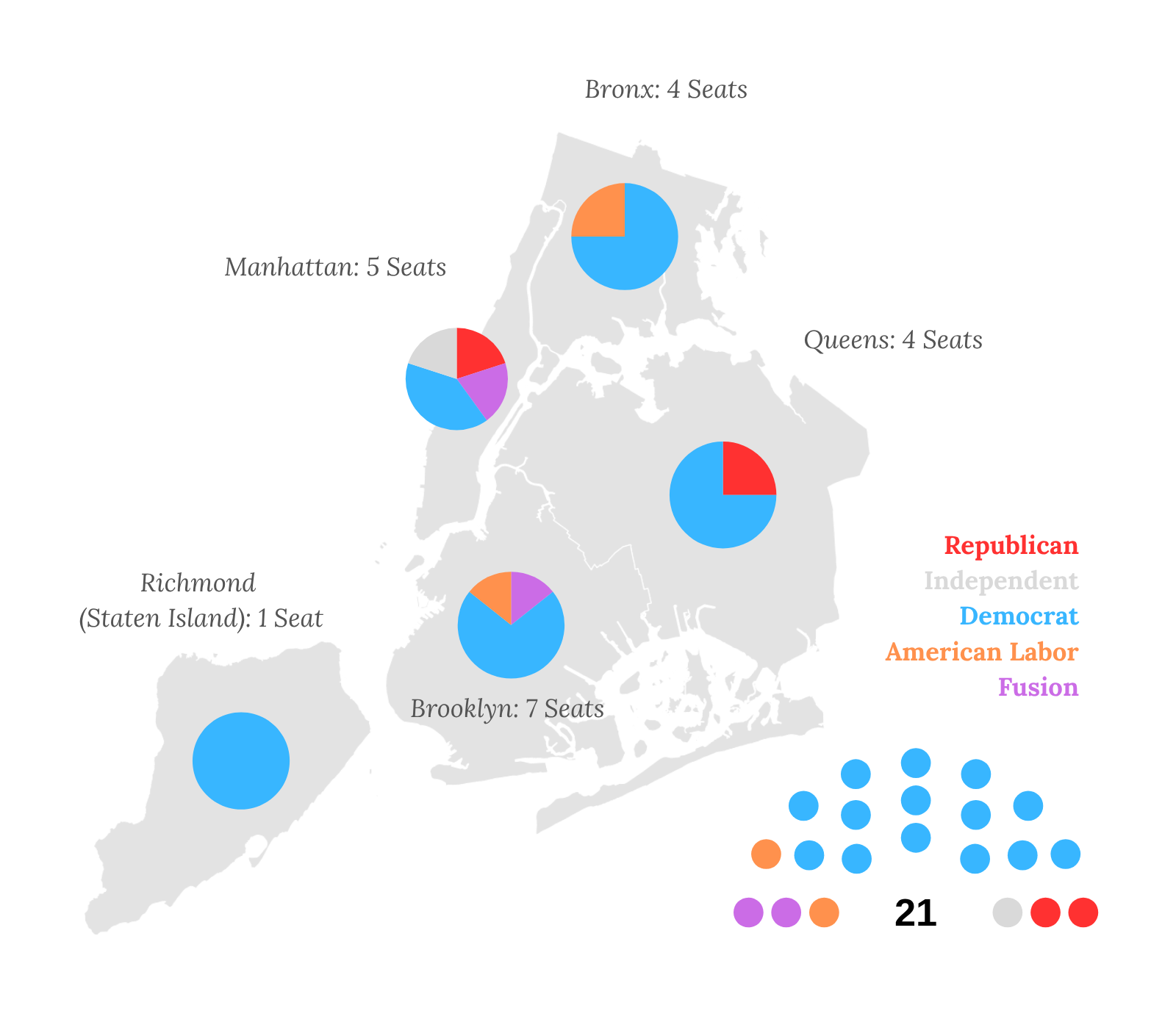
- Results of the 1939 New York City council election by borough using STV.

An election was held on November 7, 1939 for the members of the New York City Council. Although the results of the election were not in by the next day, The Brooklyn Citizen was willing to predict that all the candidates endorsed by Judge Samuel Seabury and Mayor Fiorello H. La Guardia were defeated as they had been in the other municipal contests that day, due in large part to the domestic popularity of President Franklin D. Roosevelt. The reduced turnout compared to 1937 threatened to wipe out at least 9 of the Council's then-26 seats, given that 75,000 votes were required for each seat.
