= 1937 New York City Council election =

- November 2, 1937

All 26 seats to the New York City Council 14 seats needed for a majority
	Majority party	Minority party	Third party
Party	Democratic	American Labor	Republican
Seats won	13	5	3
Percentage	47.0%	21.0%	8.5%
	Fourth party	Fifth party
Party	City Fusion	Insurgent Democrats
Seats won	3	2
Percentage	11.5%	8.0%
Elected Majority Leader
Baruch Charney Vladeck
American Labor

Elections were held on November 2, 1937, to fill the New York City Council, which had just been formed to replace the New York City Board of Aldermen. The new Council comprised 26 members elected via proportional representation by borough, in contrast to the 65-member Board of Aldermen formerly elected by single-member district district.

The change to PR had been done in response to the large seat majorities the Democrats had often been receiving in the Board of Aldermen. Formerly Democrats would fill almost the entire city council although thousands of voters voted for Republican and other candidates. The change to PR in borough districts was intended to free the candidates from control by party machines, produce both representation of the largest parties and less popular minority parties, and make fair the distribution of seats to each borough.

New York City's new STV election system used a uniform quota and biproportional apportionment. Each borough was entitled to one member of the council for each 75,000 votes cast, and an additional member for each remainder greater than 50,000. And each party that achieved quota in a borough would elect a seat.

Due to voter turnout, in 1937 Brooklyn elected nine members of the council, Manhattan six, Queens and The Bronx five each, and Richmond one. Five parties and others elected one or more seats in more or less proportional amounts.

Owing to the novelty and complexity of proportional representation, the announcement of the results of the election were expected to be significantly slowed down, and were not available until later in the month.

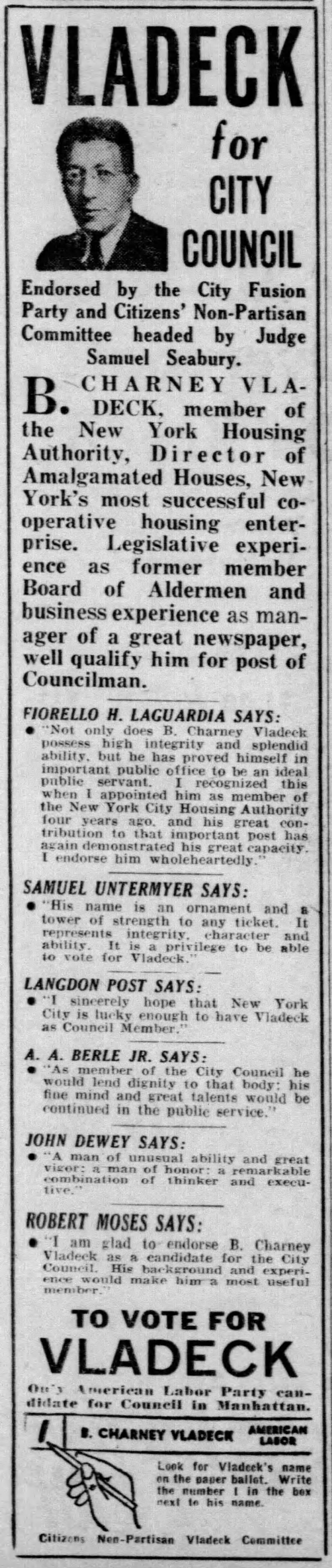
Political advertisement for Baruch Charney Vladeck's run for City Council, published in the New York Daily News, November 1, 1937

Manhattan elected three Democrats, one Republican, one member of the City Fusion party, and one member of the American Labor Party.

Brooklyn elected nine councillors: five Democrats, two American Laborites, one City Fusionist and one Communist.

Baruch Charney Vladeck of Manhattan, an American Laborite and former Alderman, was elected Majority Leader of an anti-Tammany coalition that included Laborites, Republicans, Fusionists and insurgent Democrats. John Cashmore of Brooklyn, who had served seven terms in the Board of Aldermen, was elected the Vice Chairman and consequently leader of the majority after the anti-Tammany coalition fell apart in September. The Board of Aldermen held its last meeting on December 21, and the new City Council met for the first time on January 3, 1938. Proportional representation was abolished in 1947 as it allowed Communists to be elected to the council.

The electoral reform nonprofit organization FairVote says, of the New York council election results during that period: "The City’s first black candidates were elected (including Adam Clayton Powell Jr.) [in 1945], seats were won in close proportion to votes, and far more small party candidates and independent Democrats were elected."

New York City Council elections of 1937
Party	Seats	% seats	% votes (last count)	% votes (1st preferences)
Democratic	13	50.0%	47.0%	31%
Republican	3	11.5%	8.5%	9%
Insurgent Democrats (Note: The "Roe faction in Queens", according to Zeller & Bone (1948).)	2	8.0%	7.0%	5%
American Labor	5	19.0%	21.0%	12%
City Fusion	3	11.5%	10.5%	11%
Communist	–	–	–	4%
Others	0	–	–	28%
Total	26	100.0%	94.0%	100.0%
