= Communist Party USA =

American political party

Communist Party of the United States of America
- Presidium: National Convention
- Co-chairs: Joe Sims; Rossana Cambron
- Founder: C. E. Ruthenberg; Alfred Wagenknecht
- Founded: September 1, 1919; 107 years ago
- Merger of: Communist Party of America; Communist Labor Party of America; United Toilers of America; Workers Party of America
- Split from: Socialist Party of America
- Preceded by: Left Wing Section of the Socialist Party
- Headquarters: 235 W 23rd St, New York, New York 10011
- Newspaper: People's World
- Youth wing: Young Communist League (Note: The party voted to dissolve its youth wing in 2015 and voted to re-establish it in 2019. Final Resolutions for the 31st National Convention. June 10, 2019.)
- Membership (2026): ▲11,000 active members (claimed, see membership)
- Ideology: Communism (US); Marxism–Leninism; Bill of Rights socialism
- Political position: Far-left
- International affiliation: IMCWP (since 1998); Comintern (until 1943)
- Colors: Red
- Slogan: "People and Planet Before Profits"
- Members in elected offices: 2

Party flag

Website
- www.cpusa.org

The Communist Party USA (CPUSA), officially the Communist Party of the United States of America, is a Marxist-Leninist party established in 1919, during the Russian Revolution, emerging from the left wing of the Socialist Party of America (SPA). The CPUSA sought to establish socialism in the United States via the principles of Marxism–Leninism, aligning itself with the Communist International (Comintern), which was controlled by the Soviet Union. It was considered to be the most important left-wing organization in the United States through the mid-20th century.

The CPUSA's early years were marked by factional struggles and clandestine activities. The U.S. government viewed the party as a subversive threat, leading to mass arrests and deportations in the Palmer Raids of 1919–1920. Despite this, the CPUSA expanded its influence, particularly among industrial workers, immigrants, and African Americans. In the 1920s, the party remained a small but militant force. During the Great Depression in the 1930s, the CPUSA grew in prominence under the leadership of William Z. Foster and later Earl Browder as it played a key role in labor organizing and anti-fascist movements. The party's involvement in strikes helped establish it as a formidable force within the American labor movement, particularly through the Congress of Industrial Organizations (CIO). In the mid-1930s, the CPUSA followed the Comintern's "popular front" line, which emphasized alliances with progressives and liberals. The party softened its revolutionary rhetoric, and supported President Franklin D. Roosevelt's New Deal policies. This shift allowed the CPUSA to gain broader acceptance, and its membership surged, reaching an estimated 70,000 members by the late 1930s. On the outbreak of World War II in 1939, the CPUSA initially opposed U.S. involvement, but reversed its stance after Germany invaded the Soviet Union in 1941, fervently supporting the war effort. The Popular Front era of CPUSA lasted until 1945, when Earl Browder was ousted from the party and replaced by William Z. Foster.

As the CPUSA's role in Soviet Espionage activities became more widely known, the Party suffered dramatically at onset of the Cold War. The Second Red Scare saw the party prosecuted under the Smith Act, which criminalized advocacy of violent revolution and led to high-profile trials of its leaders. This decimated the CPUSA, reducing its membership to under 10,000 by the mid-1950s. The Khrushchev Thaw and revelations of Joseph Stalin's crimes also led to internal divisions, with many members leaving the party in disillusionment. The CPUSA struggled to maintain relevance during the social movements of the 1960s and 1970s. While it supported civil rights, labor activism, and anti-Vietnam War efforts, it faced competition from New Left organizations, which rejected the party's rigid adherence to Soviet communism. The Sino-Soviet split further fractured the communist movement, with some former CPUSA members defecting to Maoist or Trotskyist groups. Under the leadership of Gus Hall (1959–2000), the CPUSA remained loyal to the Soviet Union even as other communist parties distanced themselves from Moscow's policies, which marginalized it within the American left. The collapse of the Soviet Union in 1991 dealt a devastating blow to the party, leading to financial difficulties and a further decline in membership.

In the 21st century, the CPUSA has focused on labor rights, racial justice, environmental activism, opposition to corporate capitalism, and continues to engage in leftist activism. The CPUSA publishes the newspaper People's World, and as of May of 2026, is in the process of re-establishing its theoretical journal, Political Affairs.

== Modern membership ==
In 2000, the Encyclopedia of Third Parties in America said CPUSA had about 1,000 members and "has virtually ceased to exist". CPUSA reported 2,000 members in 2011, 5,000 members in 2017 and 2018, 15,000 members in 2023, 20,000 members in 2024, and 22,000 in October 2025. In 2026, CPUSA claimed to have recruited 20,000 members since Trump's 2016 win, of which 11,000 remain active.

In the past, CPUSA often claimed a higher membership than its internal records showed. In the 1990s, CPUSA claimed its membership was 15,000 to 20,000 people, but its actual membership was likely around 1,000 to 2,000. In 2019, former Party member Daniel Rosenberg claimed "nearly half" of new joiners since 2000 paid no dues and merely signed up for the mailing list. In 2023, CPUSA said "one-third" of new members since 2021 paid dues.

== History ==
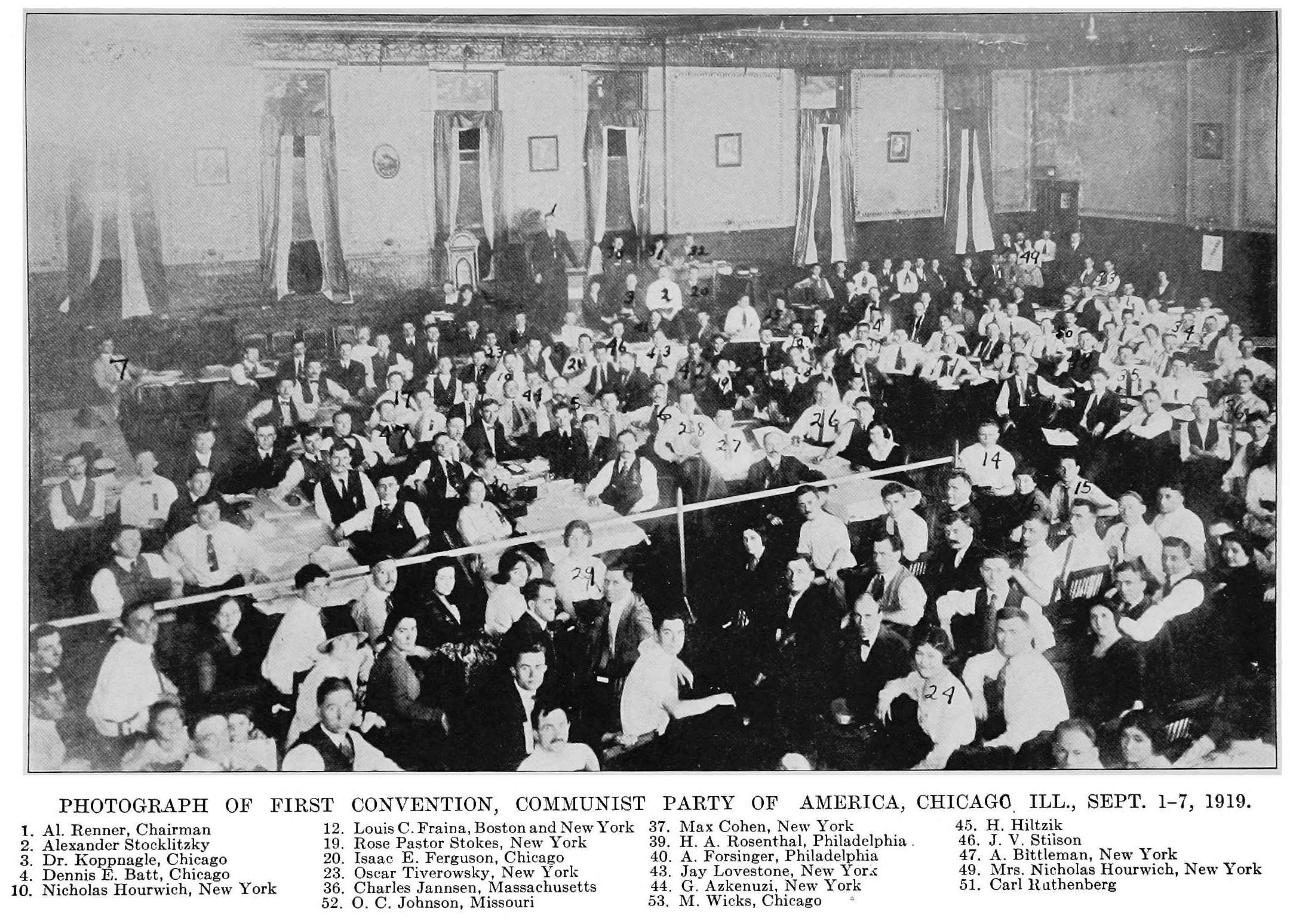
The founding convention of the Communist Party of America in Chicago, Illinois, September 1–7, 1919

During the first half of the 20th century, the Communist Party was influential in various struggles. Historian Ellen Schrecker concludes that decades of recent scholarship (Note: She mentions James Barrett, Maurice Isserman, Robin D. G. Kelley, Randi Storch and Kate Weigand.) offer "a more nuanced portrayal of the party as both a Stalinist sect tied to a vicious regime and the most dynamic organization within the American Left during the 1930s and '40s." It was also the first political party in the United States to be racially integrated.

Charter for a local unit of the CPA, dated October 24, 1919

By August 1919, only months after its founding, the Communist Party claimed to have 50,000 to 60,000 members. Its members also included anarchists and other radical leftists. At the time, the older and more moderate Socialist Party of America, suffering from criminal prosecutions for its antiwar stance during World War I, had declined to 40,000 members. The sections of the Communist Party's International Workers Order (IWO) organized for communism around linguistic and ethnic lines, providing mutual aid and tailoring cultural activities to an IWO membership that peaked at 200,000 at its height.

During the Great Depression, some Americans were attracted by the visible activism of Communists on behalf of a wide range of social and economic causes, including the rights of African Americans, workers, and the unemployed. The Communist Party played a significant role in the resurgence of organized labor in the 1930s. Others, alarmed by the rise of the Falangists in Spain and the Nazis in Germany, admired the Soviet Union's early and staunch opposition to fascism. Party membership swelled from 7,500 at the start of the decade to 55,000 by its end.

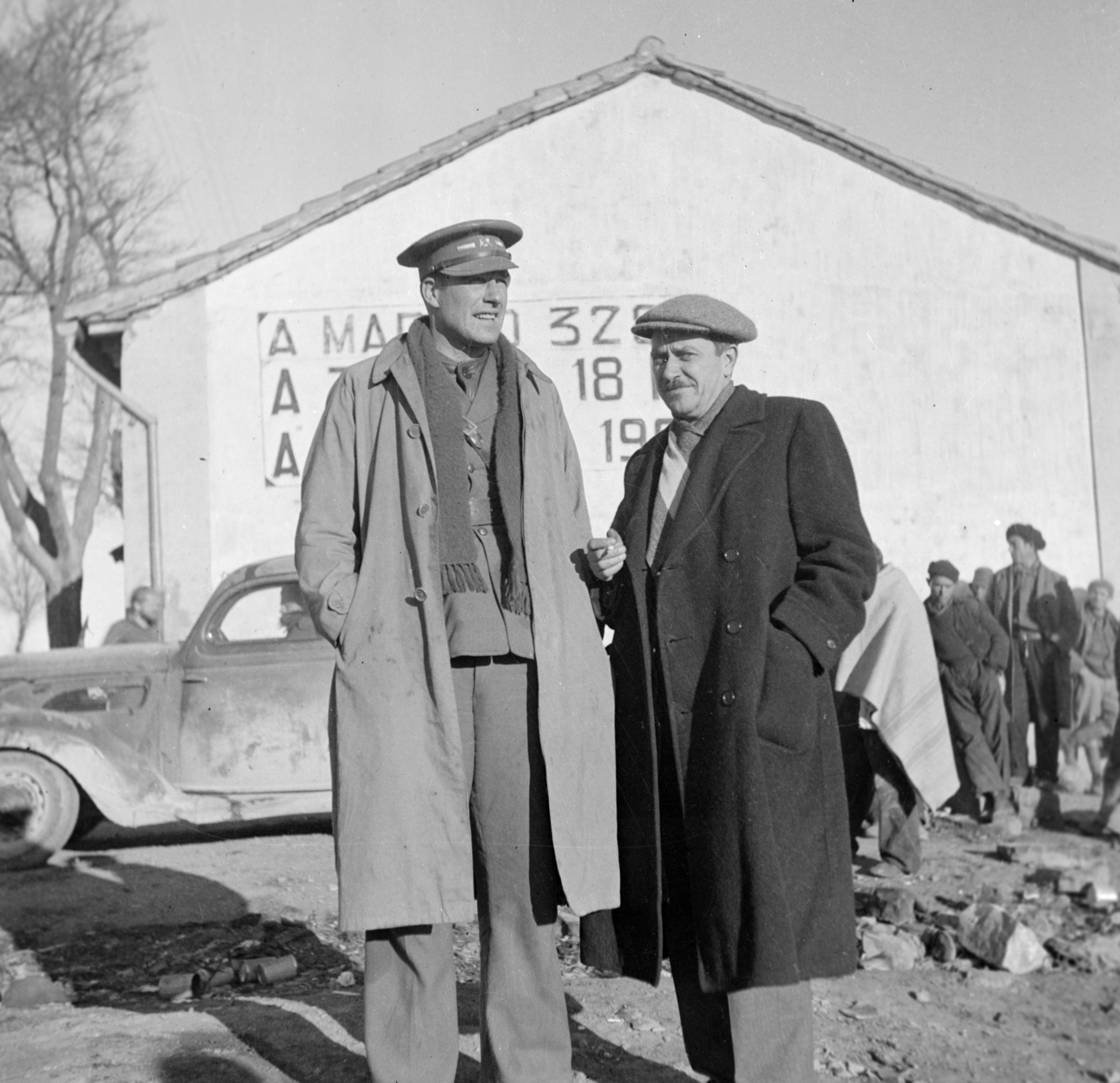
CPUSA General Secretary Earl Browder meets with Abraham Lincoln Brigade Chief of Staff Robert Hale Merriman in Spain, February 1938

Party members also rallied to the defense of the Spanish Republic during this period after a nationalist military uprising moved to overthrow it, resulting in the Spanish Civil War (1936–1939). The Communist Party of the Soviet Union, along with leftists throughout the world, raised funds for medical relief while many of its members made their way to Spain with the aid of the party to join the Lincoln Brigade, one of the International Brigades.

The Communist Party was adamantly opposed to fascism during the Popular Front period. Although membership in the party rose to about 66,000 by 1939, nearly 20,000 members left the party by 1943. While general secretary Browder at first attacked Germany for its September 1, 1939 invasion of western Poland, on September 11 the Communist Party received a communique from Moscow denouncing the Polish government. Between September 14–16, party leaders bickered about the direction to take.

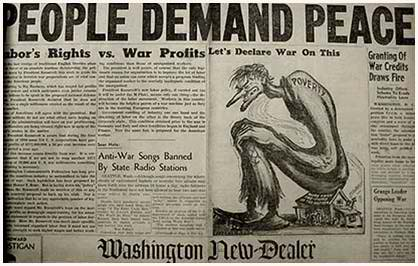
The Washington Commonwealth Federation newspaper after the signing of the Molotov-Ribbentrop pact.

On September 17, the Soviet Union invaded eastern Poland and occupied the Polish territory assigned to it by the Molotov–Ribbentrop Pact, followed by coordination with German forces in Poland. The Communist Party then turned the focus of its public activities from anti-fascism to advocating peace, opposing military preparations. The party criticized British Prime Minister Neville Chamberlain and French leader Édouard Daladier, but it did not at first attack President Roosevelt, reasoning that this could devastate American Communism, blaming instead Roosevelt's advisors. The party spread the slogans "The Yanks Are Not Coming" and "Hands Off," set up a "perpetual peace vigil" across the street from the White House, and announced that Roosevelt was the head of the "war party of the American bourgeoisie." The party was active in the isolationist America First Committee. In October and November, after the Soviets invaded Finland and forced mutual assistance pacts on Estonia, Latvia and Lithuania, the Communist Party considered Russian security sufficient justification to support the actions. The Comintern and its leader Georgi Dimitrov demanded that Browder change the party's support for Roosevelt. On October 23, the party began attacking Roosevelt. The party changed this policy again after Hitler broke the Molotov–Ribbentrop Pact by attacking the Soviet Union on June 22, 1941.

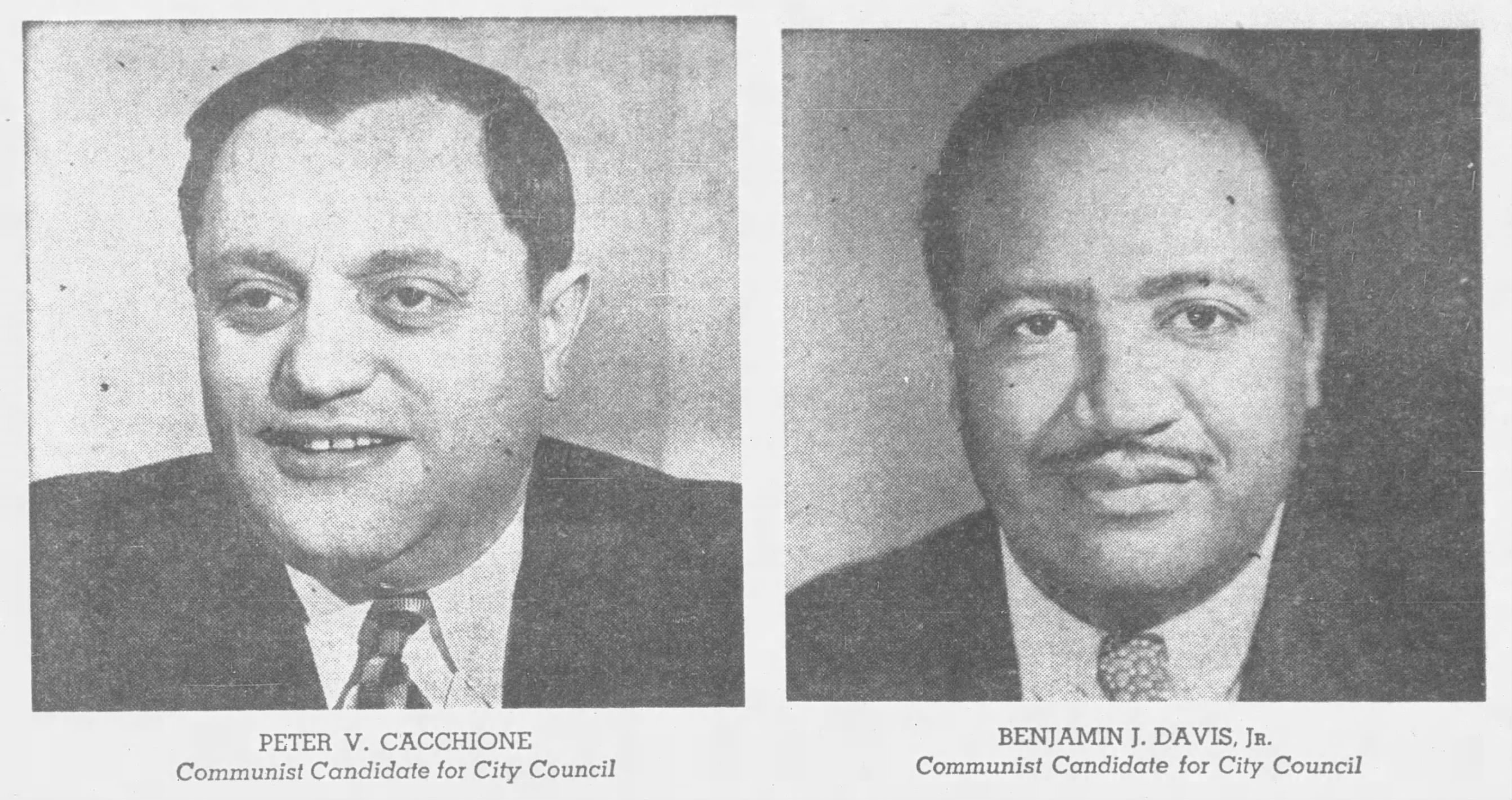
New York City Councilmen Peter V. Cacchione and Benjamin J. Davis Jr., two of the only elected officials of the Communist Party, served during and after World War II.

In August 1940, after NKVD agent Ramón Mercader killed Trotsky with an ice axe, Browder perpetuated Moscow's line that the killer, who had been dating one of Trotsky's secretaries, was a disillusioned follower.

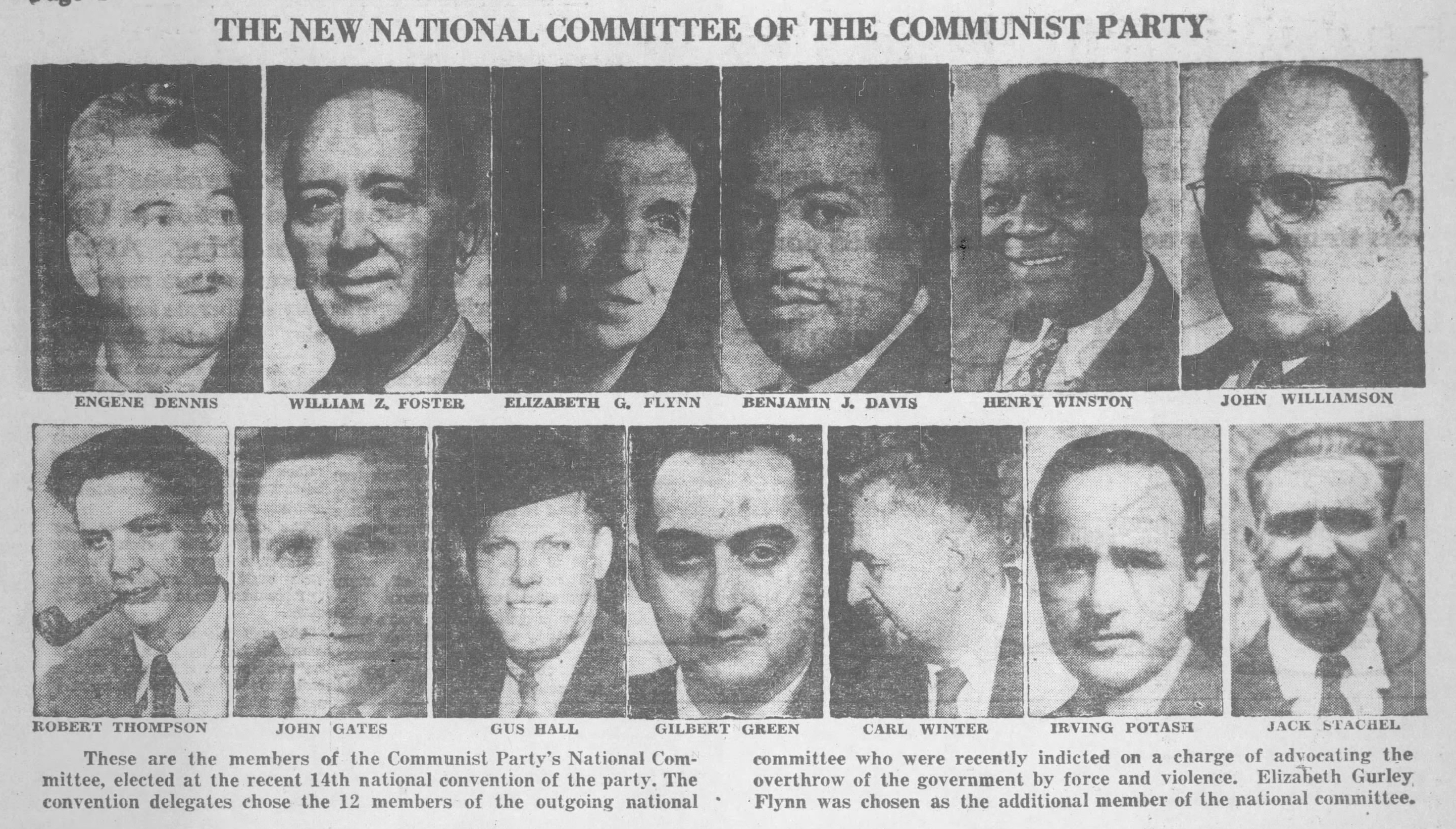
The National Committee of the Communist Party in 1948, most of whom had been arrested earlier that year under the Smith Act.

The Communist Party's early labor and organizing successes did not last long. As the decades progressed, the combined effects of McCarthyism (also known as the Second Red Scare) and Nikita Khrushchev's 1956 "Secret Speech" in which he denounced the previous decades of Joseph Stalin's rule and the adversities of the continuing Cold War mentality, steadily weakened the party's internal structure and confidence. Party membership in the Communist International and its close adherence to the political positions of the Soviet Union gave most Americans the impression that the party was not only a threatening, subversive domestic entity, but that it was also a foreign agent that espoused an ideology which was fundamentally alien and threatening to the American way of life. Internal and external crises swirled together, to the point when members who did not end up in prison for party activities either tended to disappear quietly from its ranks, or they tended to adopt more moderate political positions which were at odds with the party line. By 1957, membership had dwindled to less than 10,000, of whom some 1,500 were informants for the FBI. The party was also banned by the Communist Control Act of 1954, although it was never really enforced and Congress later repealed most provisions of the act, also with some declared unconstitutional via the court system.

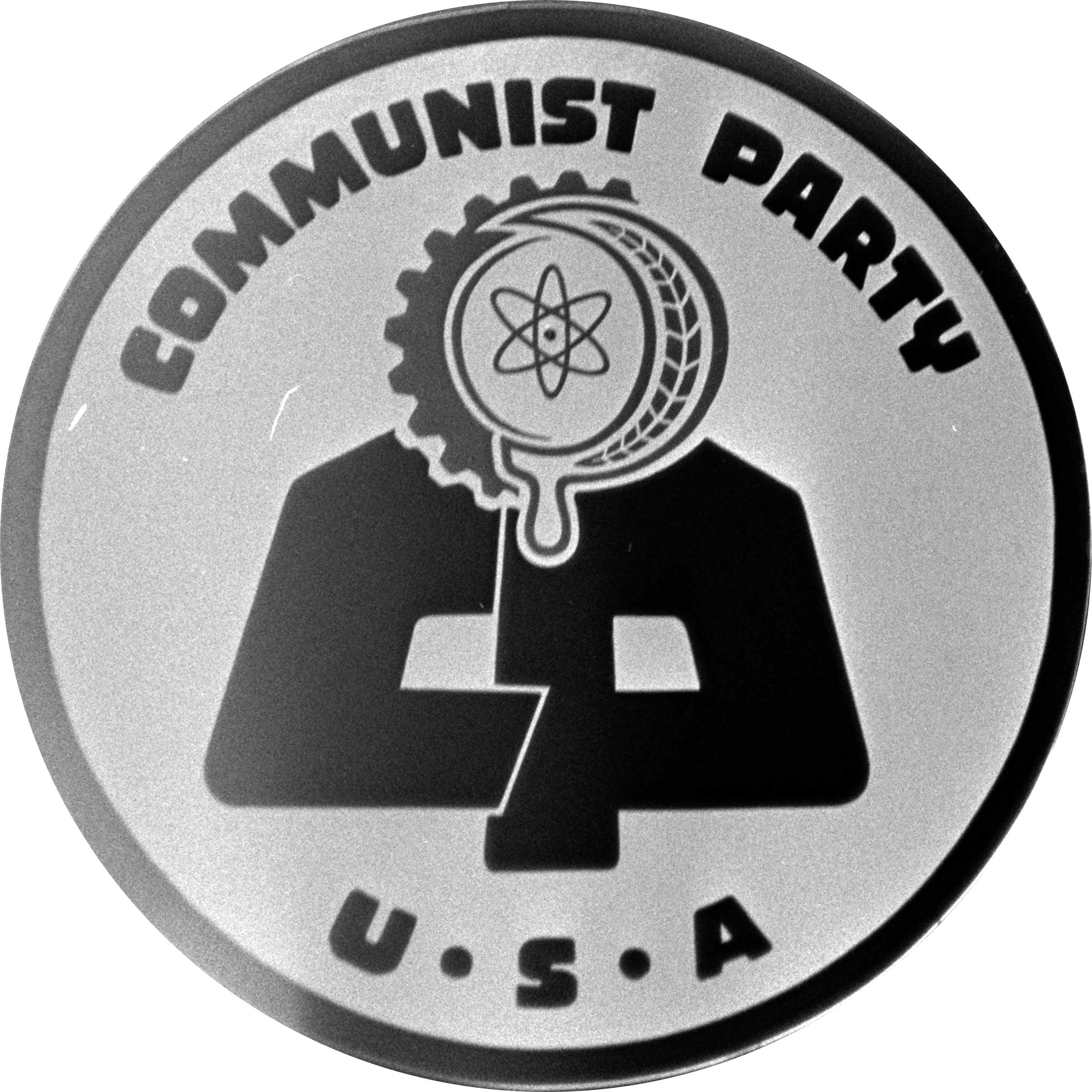
The Communist Party's logo c. 1970s

The party attempted to recover with its opposition to the Vietnam War during the civil rights movement in the 1960s, but its continued uncritical support for an increasingly stultified and militaristic Soviet Union further alienated it from the rest of the left-wing in the United States, which saw this supportive role as outdated and even dangerous. At the same time, the party's aging membership demographics distanced it from the New Left in the United States.

With the rise of Mikhail Gorbachev and his effort to radically alter the Soviet economic and political system from the mid-1980s, the Communist Party finally became estranged from the leadership of the Soviet Union itself. In 1989, the Soviet Communist Party cut off major funding to the Communist Party USA due to its opposition to glasnost and perestroika. With the dissolution of the Soviet Union in 1991, the party held its convention and attempted to resolve the issue of whether the party should reject Marxism–Leninism. The majority reasserted the party's now purely Marxist outlook, prompting a minority faction which urged social democrats to exit the now reduced party. The party has since adopted Marxism–Leninism within its program. In 2014, the new draft of the party constitution declared: "We apply the scientific outlook developed by Marx, Engels, Lenin and others in the context of our American history, culture, and traditions."

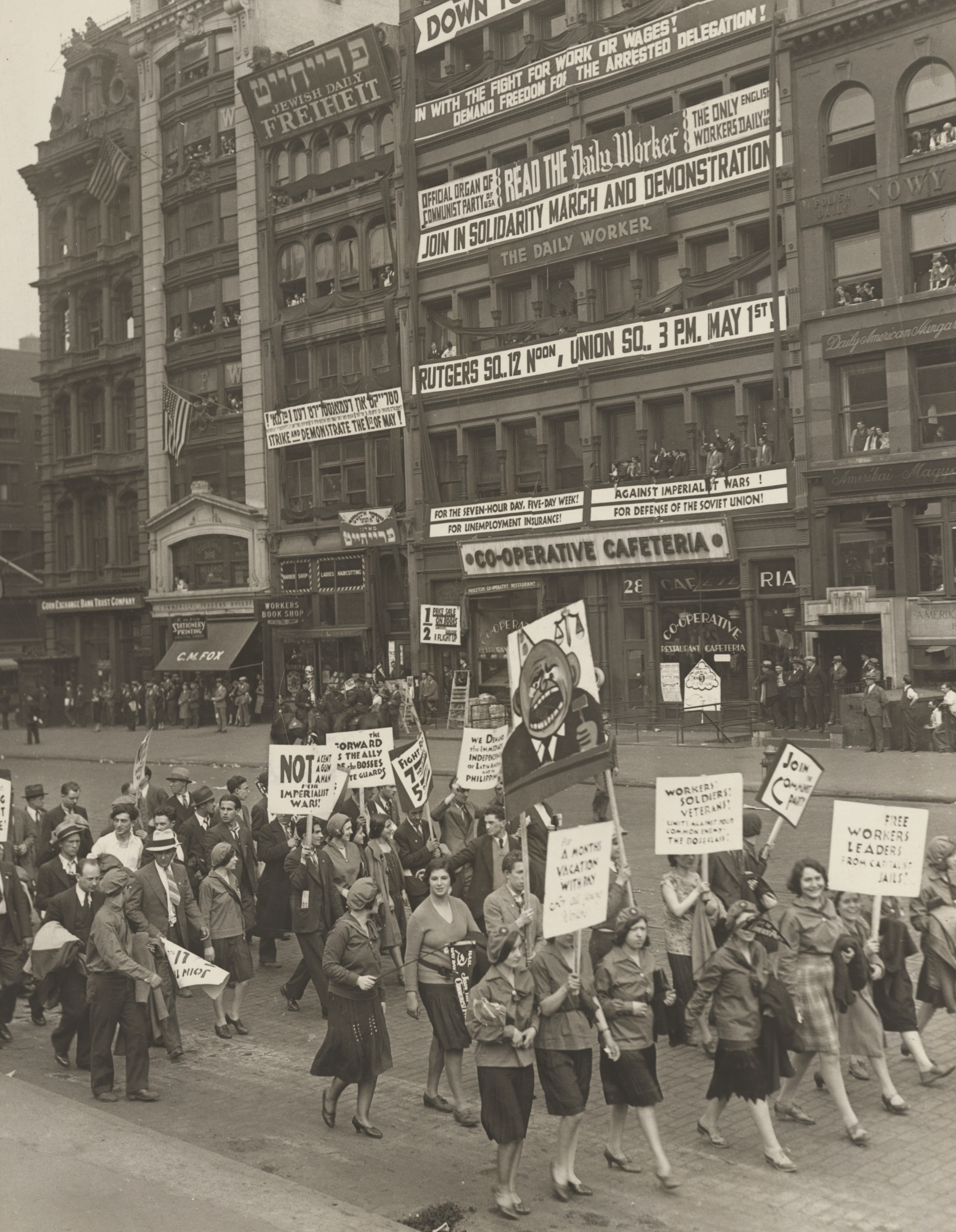
Communists march in front of the Freiheit and Daily Worker buildings in New York City during a May Day demonstration c. 1930s

The Communist Party is based in New York City. From 1924 to 1958, it published the Daily Worker, a daily newspaper, as well as the Morgen Freiheit, a Yiddish language counterpart, from 1922 to 1988. For decades, its West Coast newspaper was the People's World and its East Coast newspaper was The Daily World. The two newspapers merged in 1986 into the People's Weekly World. The People's Weekly World has since become an online only publication called People's World. It has since ceased being an official Communist Party publication as the party does not fund its publication. The party's former theoretical journal Political Affairs is now also published exclusively online, but the party still maintains International Publishers as its publishing house.

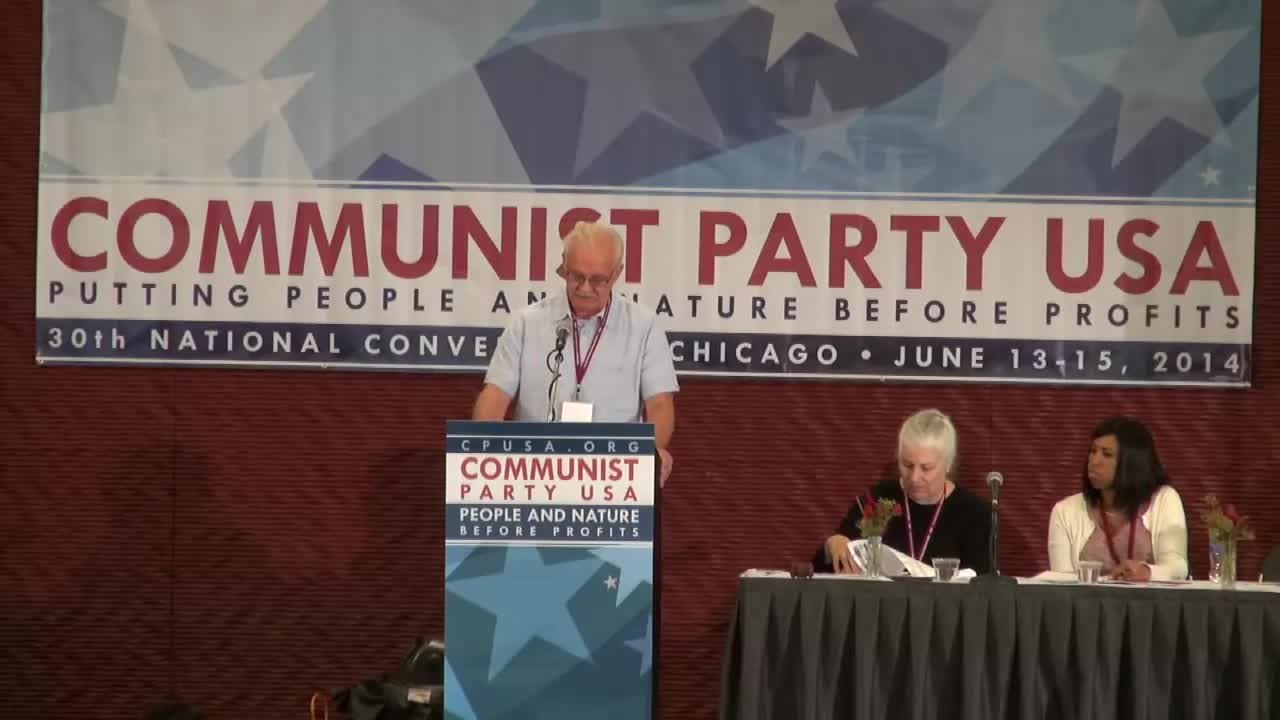
The opening of the 30th National Convention in Chicago, June 13, 2014

In June 2014, the party held its 30th National Convention in Chicago. On April 7, 2021, the party announced that it intended to run candidates in elections again, after a hiatus of over 30 years. Steven Estrada, who ran for city council in Long Beach, was one of the first candidates to run as an open member of the CPUSA again (although Long Beach local elections are officially non-partisan). Estrada received 8.5% of the vote. In 2025 the party increased its electoral activity, fielding candidates for city council in Ithaca and Northampton, with both candidates advancing from the primary. That November, their candidate in Ithaca, Hannah Shvets, was elected with 64% of the vote. Additionally, Communist Party member Daniel Carson was elected to the Bangor city council, coming in second place out of nine candidates (the top three were elected) in a non-partisan election.

In July 2024, dissenting members of the CPUSA formed their own party, the American Communist Party, citing the CPUSA's support for the Democratic Party and alleged abandonment of Marxism–Leninism, with online political commentators Haz Al-Din as its founding chairman and Jackson Hinkle as a founding Plenary Committee member. The party, Al-Din, and Hinkle have drawn criticism for populist tactics such as MAGA Communism.

In May 2026, party co-chair Joe Sims announced on social media that the CPUSA would be re-establishing its theoretical journal Political Affairs; however, no timeline on an official relaunch date has been announced.

== Beliefs ==
=== Constitution program ===
According to the constitution of the party adopted at the 30th National Convention in 2014, the Communist Party operates on the principle of democratic centralism, its highest authority being the quadrennial National Convention. Article VI, Section 3 of the 2001 Constitution laid out certain positions as non-negotiable:

[S]truggle for the unity of the working class, against all forms of national oppression, national chauvinism, discrimination and segregation, against all racist ideologies and practices, ... against all manifestations of male supremacy and discrimination against women, ... against homophobia and all manifestations of discrimination against gays, lesbians, bisexuals, and transgender people.

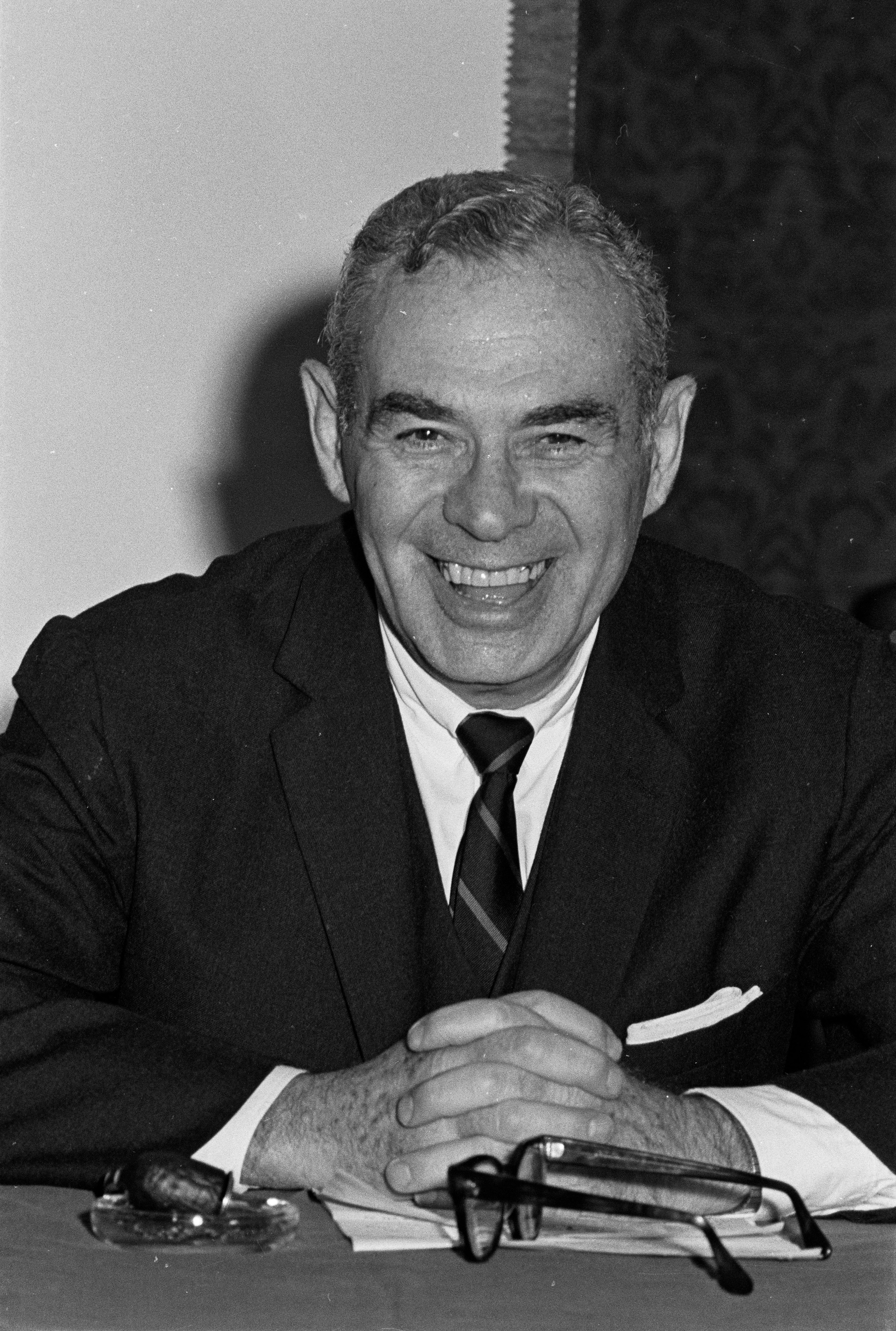
Si Gerson, a leading member of the party specializing in campaigns and elections, who long advocated for proportional representation and instant runoff voting as secretary of the Coalition for Free and Open Elections.

Among the points in the party's "Immediate Program" are a $15/hour minimum wage for all workers, national universal health care, and opposition to privatization of Social Security. Economic measures such as increased taxes on "the rich and corporations, strong regulation of the financial industry, regulation and public ownership of utilities," and increased federal aid to cities and states are also included in the Immediate Program, as are opposition to the Iraq War and other military interventions; opposition to free trade treaties such as the North American Free Trade Agreement (NAFTA); nuclear disarmament and a reduced military budget; various civil rights provisions; campaign finance reform including public financing of campaigns; and election law reform, including instant runoff voting.

=== Bill of rights socialism ===
The Communist Party emphasizes a vision of socialism as an extension of American democracy. Seeking to "build socialism in the United States based on the revolutionary traditions and struggles" of American history, the party promotes a conception of "Bill of Rights Socialism" that will "guarantee all the freedoms we have won over centuries of struggle and also extend the Bill of Rights to include freedom from unemployment" as well as freedom "from poverty, from illiteracy, and from discrimination and oppression."

Reiterating the idea of property rights in socialist society as it is outlined in Karl Marx and Friedrich Engels's Communist Manifesto (1848), the Communist Party emphasizes:

Many myths have been propagated about socialism. Contrary to right-wing claims, socialism would not take away the personal private property of workers, only the private ownership of major industries, financial institutions, and other large corporations, and the excessive luxuries of the super-rich.

Rather than making all wages entirely equal, the Communist Party holds that building socialism would entail "eliminating private wealth from stock speculation, from private ownership of large corporations, from the export of capital and jobs, and from the exploitation of large numbers of workers."

=== Living standards ===
Among the primary concerns of the Communist Party are the problems of unemployment, underemployment and job insecurity, which the party considers the natural result of the profit-driven incentives of the capitalist economy:

Millions of workers are unemployed, underemployed, or insecure in their jobs, even during economic upswings and periods of 'recovery' from recessions. Most workers experience long years of stagnant and declining real wages, while health and education costs soar. Many workers are forced to work second and third jobs to make ends meet. Most workers now average four different occupations during their lifetime, many involuntarily moved from job to job and career to career. Often, retirement-age workers are forced to continue working just to provide health care for themselves and their families. Millions of people continuously live below the poverty level; many suffer homelessness and hunger. Public and private programs to alleviate poverty and hunger do not reach everyone, and are inadequate even for those they do reach. With capitalist globalization, jobs move from place to place as capitalists export factories and even entire industries to other countries in a relentless search for the lowest wages.

The Communist Party believes that "class struggle starts with the fight for wages, hours, benefits, working conditions, job security, and jobs. But it also includes an endless variety of other forms for fighting specific battles: resisting speed-up, picketing, contract negotiations, strikes, demonstrations, lobbying for pro-labor legislation, elections, and even general strikes". The Communist Party's national programs considers workers who struggle "against the capitalist class or any part of it on any issue with the aim of improving or defending their lives" part of the class struggle.

=== Imperialism and war ===
The Communist Party maintains that developments within the foreign policy of the United States—as reflected in the rise of neoconservatives and other groups associated with right-wing politics—have developed in tandem with the interests of large-scale capital such as the multinational corporations. The state thereby becomes thrust into a proxy role that is essentially inclined to help facilitate "control by one section of the capitalist class over all others and over the whole of society".

Accordingly, the Communist Party holds that right-wing policymakers such as the neoconservatives, steering the state away from working-class interests on behalf of a disproportionately powerful capitalist class, have "demonized foreign opponents of the U.S., covertly funded the right-wing-initiated civil war in Nicaragua, and gave weapons to the Saddam Hussein dictatorship in Iraq. They picked small countries to invade, including Panama and Grenada, testing new military equipment and strategy, and breaking down resistance at home and abroad to U.S. military invasion as a policy option".

From its ideological framework, the Communist Party understands imperialism as the pinnacle of capitalist development: the state, working on behalf of the few who wield disproportionate power, assumes the role of proffering "phony rationalizations" for economically driven imperial ambition as a means to promote the sectional economic interests of big business.

In opposition to what it considers the ultimate agenda of the conservative wing of American politics, the Communist Party rejects foreign policy proposals such as the Bush Doctrine, rejecting the right of the American government to attack "any country it wants, to conduct war without end until it succeeds everywhere, and even to use 'tactical' nuclear weapons and militarize space. Whoever does not support the U.S. policy is condemned as an opponent. Whenever international organizations, such as the United Nations, do not support U.S. government policies, they are reluctantly tolerated until the U.S. government is able to subordinate or ignore them".

Juxtaposing the support from the Republicans and the right wing of the Democratic Party for the Bush administration-led invasion of Iraq with the many millions of Americans who opposed the invasion of Iraq from its beginning, the Communist Party notes the spirit of opposition towards the war coming from the American public:

Thousands of grassroots peace committees [were] organized by ordinary Americans ... neighborhoods, small towns and universities expressing opposition in countless creative ways. Thousands of actions, vigils, teach-ins and newspaper advertisements were organized. The largest demonstrations were held since the Vietnam War. 500,000 marched in New York after the war started. Students at over 500 universities conducted a Day of Action for "Books not Bombs."

Over 150 anti-war resolutions were passed by city councils. Resolutions were passed by thousands of local unions and community organizations. Local and national actions were organized on the Internet, including the "Virtual March on Washington DC" .... Elected officials were flooded with millions of calls, emails and letters.

In an unprecedented development, large sections of the US labor movement officially opposed the war. In contrast, it took years to build labor opposition to the Vietnam War. ... For example in Chicago, labor leaders formed Labor United for Peace, Justice and Prosperity. They concluded that mass education of their members was essential to counter false propaganda, and that the fight for the peace, economic security and democratic rights was interrelated.

The party has consistently opposed American involvement in the Korean War, the Vietnam War, the First Gulf War and the post-September 11 conflicts in both Iraq and Afghanistan. The Communist Party does not believe that the threat of terrorism can be resolved through war.

=== Women and minorities ===
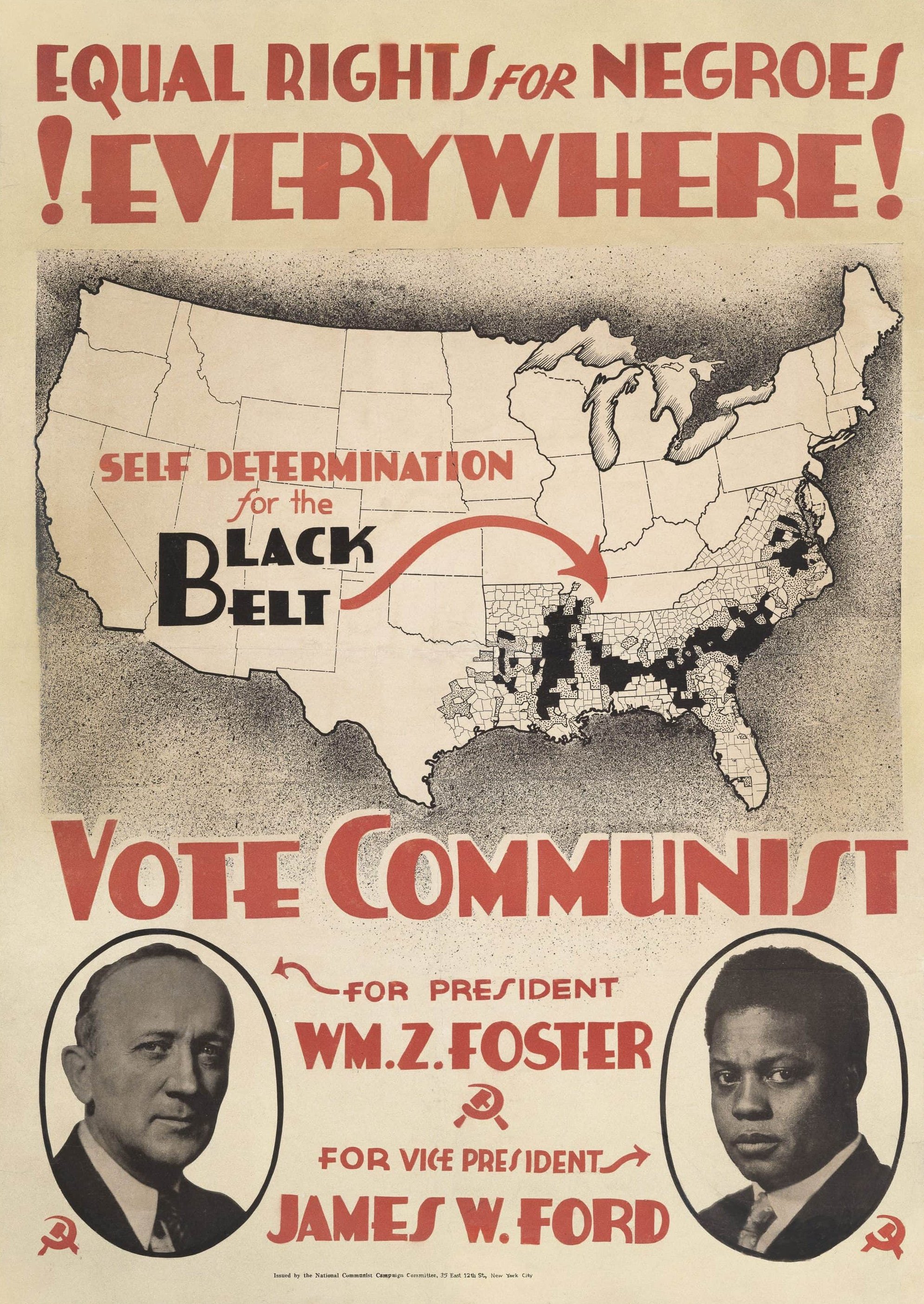
A 1932 Communist Party campaign poster featuring William Z. Foster and James W. Ford as candidates for president and vice president, alongside the promise of self-determination for the Black Belt.

The Communist Party Constitution defines the U.S. working class as "multiracial and multinational. It unites men and women, young and old, gay and straight, native-born and immigrant, urban and rural." The party further expands its interpretation to include the employed and unemployed, organized and unorganized, and of all occupations.

The Communist Party seeks equal rights for women, equal pay for equal work and the protection of reproductive rights, together with putting an end to sexism. They support the right of abortion and social services to provide access to it, arguing that unplanned pregnancy is prejudiced against poor women. The party's ranks include a Women's Equality Commission, which recognizes the role of women as an asset in moving towards building socialism.

Historically significant in American history as an early fighter for African Americans' rights and playing a leading role in protesting the lynchings of African Americans in the South, the Communist Party in its national program today calls racism the "classic divide-and-conquer tactic". (Note: See also The Communist Party and African-Americans and the article on the Scottsboro Boys for the Communist Party's work in promoting minority rights and involvement in the historically significant case of the Scottsboro Boys in the 1930s.) From its New York City base, the Communist Party's Ben Davis Club and other Communist Party organizations have been involved in local activism in Harlem and other African American and minority communities. The Communist Party was instrumental in the founding of the progressive Black Radical Congress in 1998, as well as the African Blood Brotherhood.

Historically significant in Latino working class history as a successful organizer of the Mexican American working class in the Southwestern United States in the 1930s, the Communist Party regards working-class Latino people as another oppressed group targeted by overt racism as well as systemic discrimination in areas such as education and sees the participation of Latino voters in a general mass movement in both party-based and nonpartisan work as an essential goal for major left-wing progress.

The Communist Party holds that racial and ethnic discrimination not only harms minorities, but is pernicious to working-class people of all backgrounds as any discriminatory practices between demographic sections of the working class constitute an inherently divisive practice responsible for "obstructing the development of working-class consciousness, driving wedges in class unity to divert attention from class exploitation, and creating extra profits for the capitalist class". (Note: See also Executive Vice Chair Jarvis Tyner's ideological essay "The National Question". CPUSA Online. August 1, 2003. Retrieved April 7, 2009.)

The Communist Party supports an end to racial profiling. The party supports continued enforcement of civil rights laws as well as affirmative action.

== Geography ==
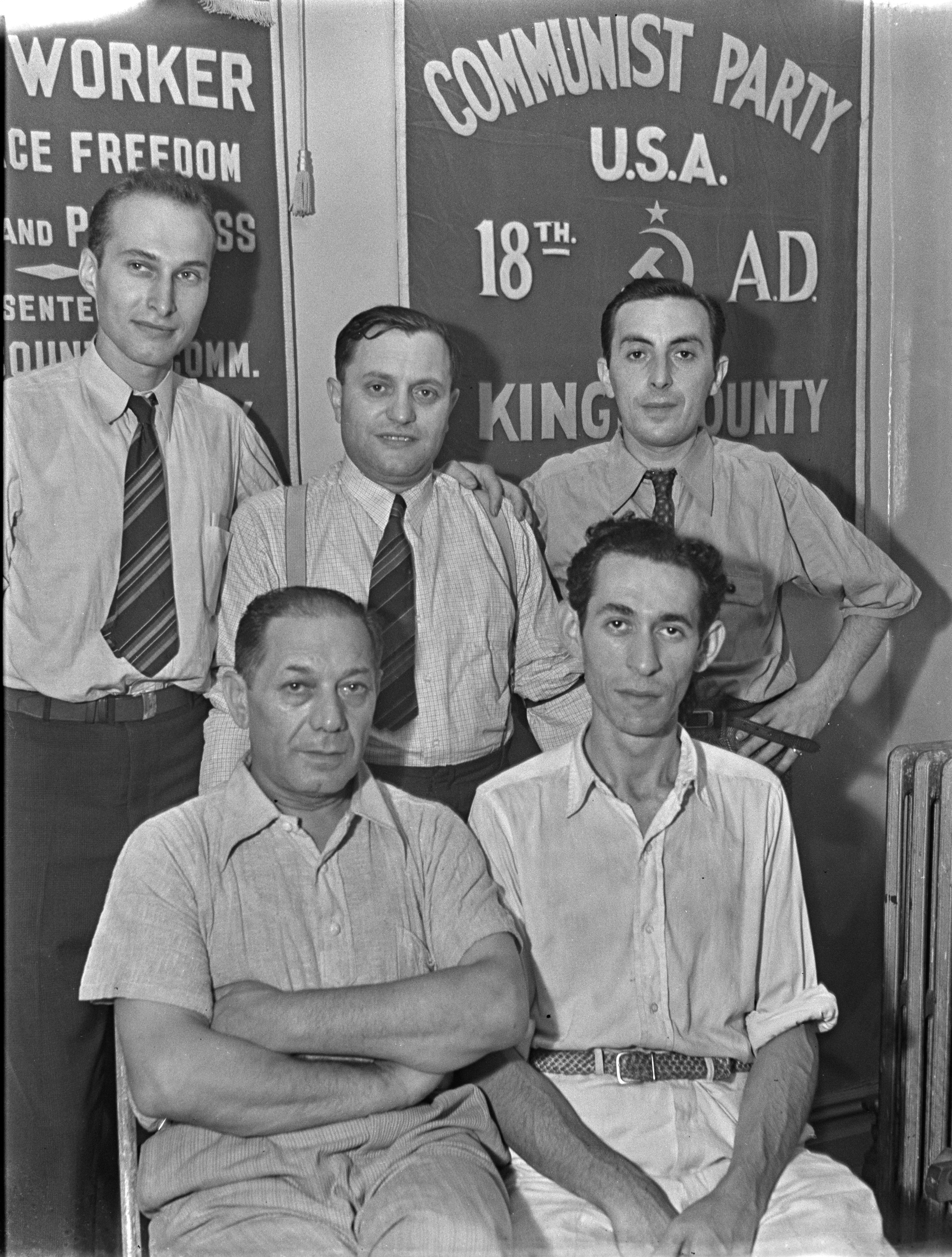
Peter V. Cacchione (standing, center), chairman of the Kings County Communist Party, alongside other leaders of the party in the borough, August 25, 1938

The Communist Party garnered support in particular communities, developing a unique geography. Instead of a broad nationwide support, support for the party was concentrated in different communities at different times, depending on the organizing strategy at that moment.

Before World War II, the Communist Party had relatively stable support in New York City, Chicago and St. Louis County, Minnesota. However, at times the party also had strongholds in more rural counties such as Sheridan County, Montana (22% in 1932), Iron County, Wisconsin (4% in 1932), or Ontonagon County, Michigan (5% in 1934). Even in the South at the height of Jim Crow, the Communist Party had a significant presence in Alabama. Despite the disenfranchisement of African Americans, the party gained 8% of the votes in rural Elmore County. This was mostly due to the successful biracial organizing of sharecroppers through the Sharecroppers' Union.

Unlike open mass organizations like the Socialist Party or the NAACP, the Communist Party was a disciplined organization that demanded strenuous commitments and frequently expelled members. Membership levels remained below 20,000 until 1933 and then surged upward in the late 1930s, reaching 66,000 in 1939 and reaching its peak membership of over 75,000 in 1947.

The party fielded candidates in presidential and many state and local elections not expecting to win, but expecting loyalists to vote the party ticket. The party mounted symbolic yet energetic campaigns during each presidential election from 1924 through 1940 and many gubernatorial and congressional races from 1922 to 1944.

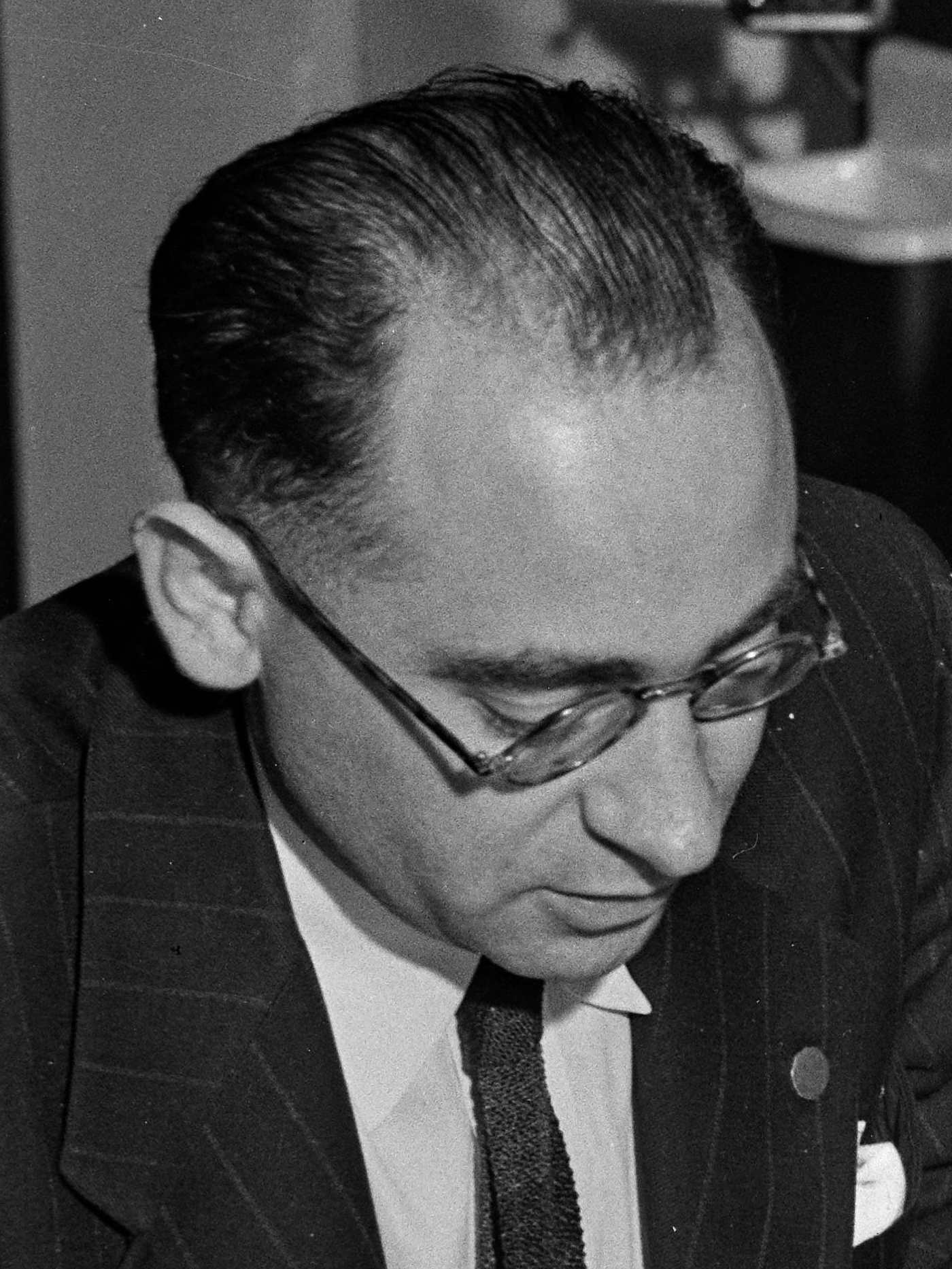
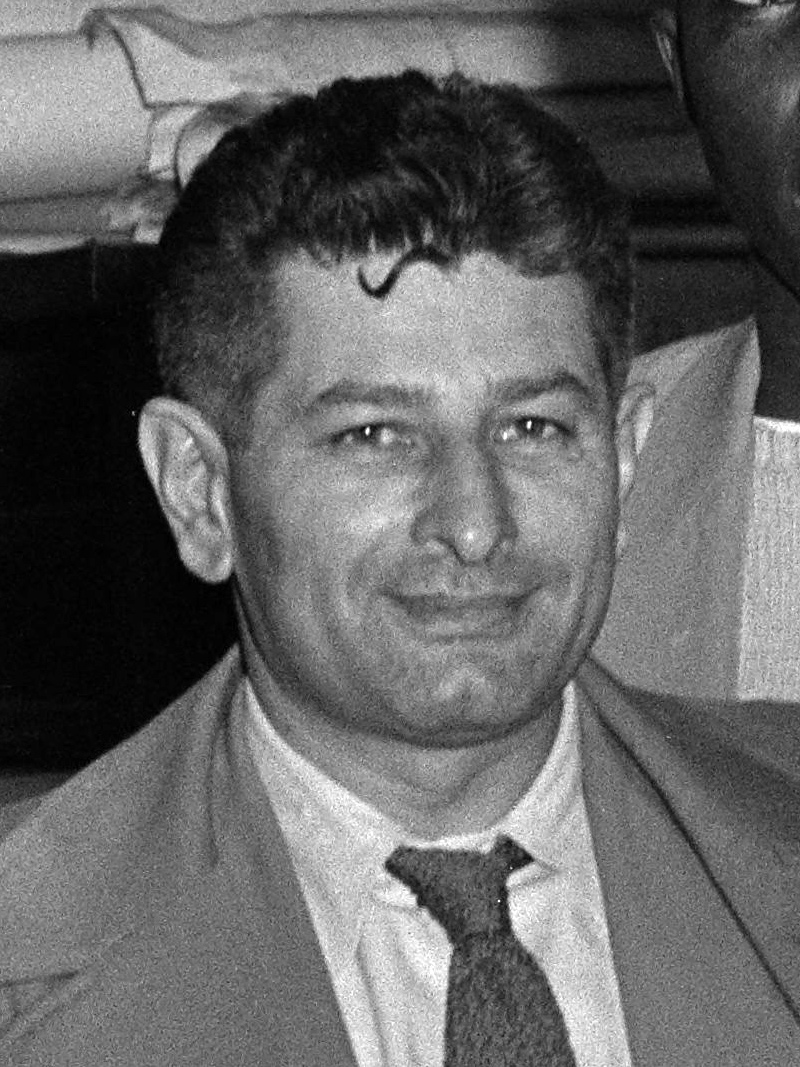
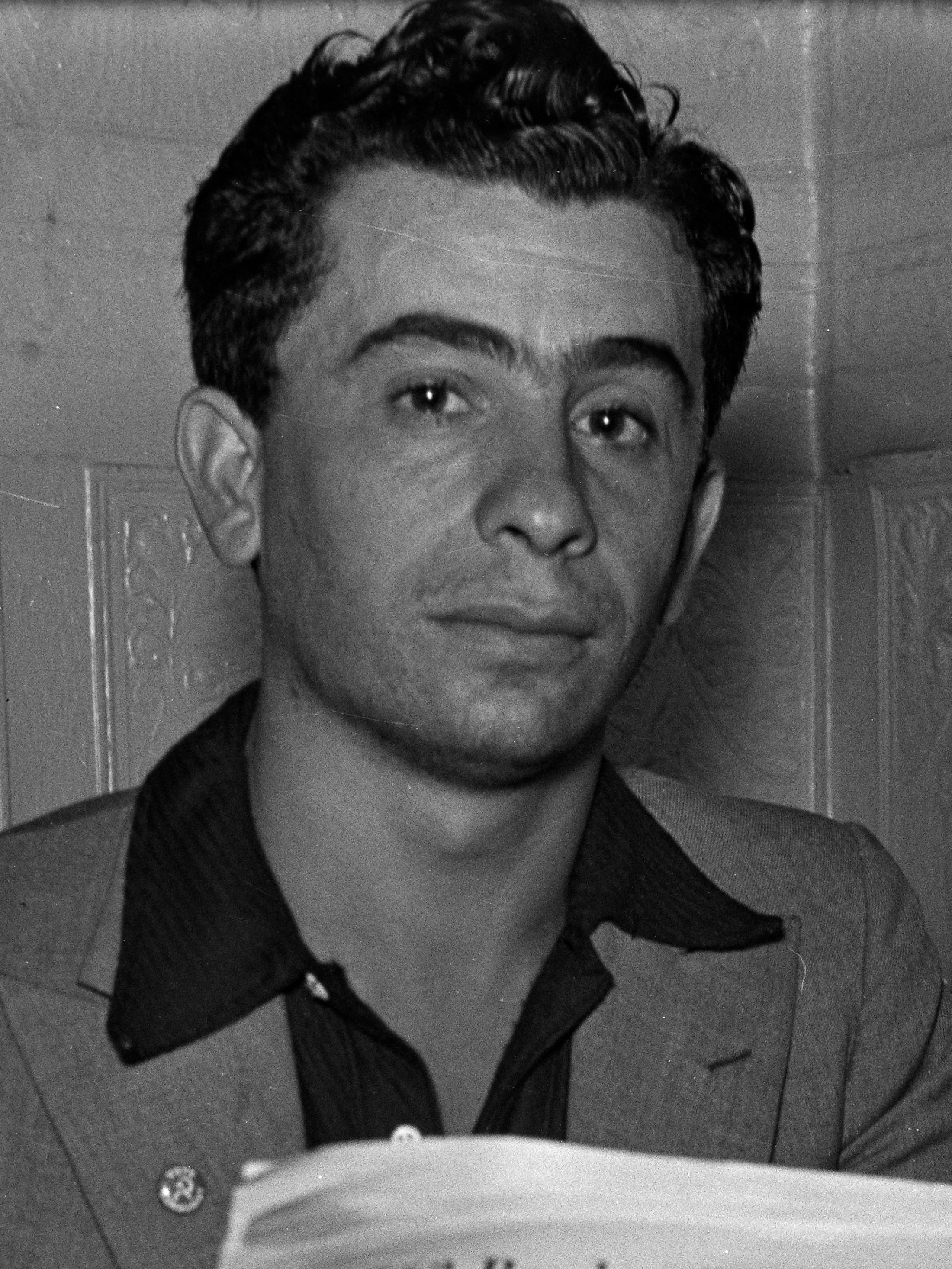
Isidore Begun (left), George Blake Charney (center) and Carl Vedro, Jewish emigrants from the Russian Empire, who by 1947 were serving as chairmen of the party in the Bronx, Manhattan and Brooklyn, respectively.

The party also attracted a significant Jewish membership which began to solidify by the 1930s. Significant portions of the CPUSA at its founding in 1919 were not Jewish, though this began to rise with the split of the Jewish Federation within the Socialist Party in 1921, which attracted numbers of Jews to join. By the 1920s, 15% of the CPUSA's membership were American Jews. Around 50% of the party was from the Finnish language federation in 1925, with Yugoslavs and Bulgarians making up a quarter and English speakers being only 10%.

At the Molotov-Ribbentrop Pact, the party had reached a percentage of 40% Jewish membership, however the party's stance on the issue of Nazi Germany caused a collapse after the party signaled its support for the USSR's foreign policy, losing around 15-40% of its 50,000 membership. Support for Zionism after the war garned back a segment of Jewish support. At the 1948 Presidential election, 30% of Henry Wallace's vote came from Jews and with 10% of all Jews in total voting for him compared with 2% from non-Jews.

Around 1/3rd of the Central Committee of the CPUSA were Jewish throughout its history from 1921 up to 2004.

The Communist Party organized the country into districts that did not coincide with state lines, initially dividing it into 15 districts identified with a headquarters city with an additional "Agricultural District". Several reorganizations in the 1930s expanded the number of districts.

The Party has always been headquartered in New York and that city accounted for a significant portion of national membership, usually at least one-third, sometimes approaching half of the total. In 1930, 3,084 out of 6,822 members lived in District 1 (New York state). In 1939, 25,327 out of 66,000 total membership were New Yorkers; and 25,000 out of 54,000 in 1949. District 8, headquartered in Chicago usually accounted for about 10% of members in the 1920s and early 1930s, but then was overtaken by District 13 (California) starting in the late 1930s.

== Relations with other groups ==
=== United States labor movement ===
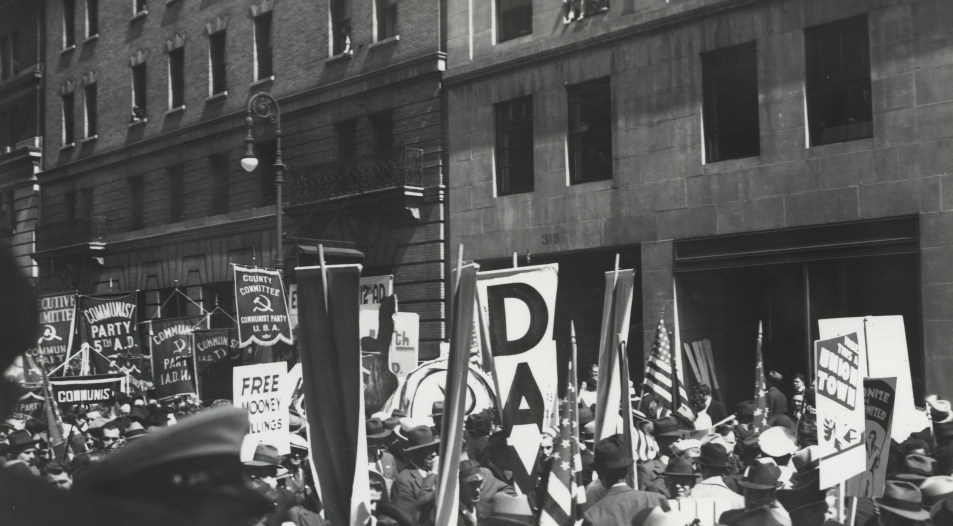
New York May Day parade with banners and flags c. 1930s

The Communist Party has sought to play an active role in the labor movement since its origins as part of its effort to build a mass movement of American workers to bring about their own liberation through socialist revolution.

=== Soviet funding and espionage ===
From 1959 until 1989, when Gus Hall condemned the initiatives taken by Mikhail Gorbachev in the Soviet Union, the Communist Party received a substantial subsidy from the Soviets. There is at least one receipt signed by Gus Hall in the KGB archives. Starting with $75,000 in 1959, this was increased gradually to $3 million in 1987. This substantial amount reflected the party's loyalty to the Moscow line, in contrast to the Italian and later Spanish and British Communist parties, whose Eurocommunism deviated from the orthodox line in the late 1970s. Releases from the Soviet archives show that all national Communist parties that conformed to the Soviet line were funded in the same fashion. From the Communist point of view, this international funding arose from the internationalist nature of communism itself as fraternal assistance was considered the duty of communists in any one country to give aid to their allies in other countries. From the anti-Communist point of view, this funding represented an unwarranted interference by one country in the affairs of another. The cutoff of funds in 1989 resulted in a financial crisis, which forced the party to cut back publication in 1990 of the party newspaper, the People's Daily World, to weekly publication, the People's Weekly World (see references below).

Somewhat more controversial than mere funding is the alleged involvement of Communist members in espionage for the Soviet Union. Whittaker Chambers alleged that Sandor Goldberger—also known as Josef Peters, who commonly wrote under the name J. Peters—headed the Communist Party's underground secret apparatus from 1932 to 1938 and pioneered its role as an auxiliary to Soviet intelligence activities. Bernard Schuster, Organizational Secretary of the New York District of the Communist Party, is claimed to have been the operational recruiter and conduit for members of the party into the ranks of the secret apparatus, or "Group A line".

Stalin publicly disbanded the Comintern in 1943. A Moscow NKVD message to all stations on September 12, 1943, detailed instructions for handling intelligence sources within the Communist Party after the disestablishment of the Comintern.

There are a number of decrypted World War II Soviet messages between NKVD offices in the United States and Moscow, also known as the Venona cables. The Venona cables and other published sources appear to confirm that Julius Rosenberg was responsible for espionage. Theodore Hall, a Harvard-trained physicist who did not join the party until 1952, began passing information on the atomic bomb to the Soviets soon after he was hired at Los Alamos at age 19. Hall, who was known as Mlad by his KGB handlers, escaped prosecution. Hall's wife, aware of his espionage, claims that their NKVD handler had advised them to plead innocent, as the Rosenbergs did, if formally charged.

It was the belief of opponents of the Communist Party such as J. Edgar Hoover, longtime director of the FBI; and Joseph McCarthy, for whom McCarthyism is named; and other anti-Communists that the Communist Party constituted an active conspiracy, was secretive, loyal to a foreign power and whose members assisted Soviet intelligence in the clandestine infiltration of American government. This is the traditionalist view of some in the field of Communist studies such as Harvey Klehr and John Earl Haynes, since supported by several memoirs of ex-Soviet KGB officers and information obtained from the Venona project and Soviet archives.

At one time, this view was shared by the majority of the Congress. In the "Findings and declarations of fact" section of the Subversive Activities Control Act of 1950 (50 U.S.C. Chap. 23 Sub. IV Sec. 841), it stated:

[T]he Communist Party, although purportedly a political party, is in fact an instrumentality of a conspiracy to overthrow the Government of the United States. It constitutes an authoritarian dictatorship within a republic ... the policies and programs of the Communist Party are secretly prescribed for it by the foreign leaders ... to carry into action slavishly the assignments given. ... [T]he Communist Party acknowledges no constitutional or statutory limitations. ... The peril inherent in its operation arises [from] its dedication to the proposition that the present constitutional Government of the United States ultimately must be brought to ruin by any available means, including resort to force and violence ... its role as the agency of a hostile foreign power renders its existence a clear present and continuing danger.

In 1993, experts from the Library of Congress traveled to Moscow to copy previously secret archives of the party records, sent to the Soviet Union for safekeeping by party organizers. The records provided an irrefutable link between Soviet intelligence and information obtained by the Communist Party and its contacts in the United States government from the 1920s through the 1940s. Some documents revealed that the Communist Party was actively involved in secretly recruiting party members from African American groups and rural farm workers. Other party records contained further evidence that Soviet sympathizers had indeed infiltrated the State Department, beginning in the 1930s. Included in Communist Party archival records were confidential letters from two American ambassadors in Europe to Roosevelt and a senior State Department official. Thanks to an official in the Department of State sympathetic to the party, the confidential correspondence, concerning political and economic matters in Europe, ended up in the hands of Soviet intelligence.

==== Counterintelligence ====
In 1952, Jack and Morris Childs, together codenamed SOLO, became FBI informants. As high-ranking officials in the party, they informed on the CPUSA for the rest of the Cold War, monitoring the Soviet funding. They also traveled to Moscow and Beijing to meet USSR and PRC leadership. Jack and Morris Childs both received the Presidential Medal of Freedom in 1987 for their intelligence work. Morris's son stated, "The CIA could not believe the information the FBI had because the Communist Party of the USA had links directly into the Kremlin."

According to intelligence analyst Darren E. Tromblay, the SOLO operation, and the Ad Hoc Committee, were part of "developing geopolitical awareness" by the FBI about factors such as the Sino-Soviet split. The Ad Hoc Committee was a group within CPUSA that circulated a pro-Maoist bulletin in the voice of a "dedicated but rebellious comrade." Allegedly an operation, it caused a schism within the CPUSA.

=== Criminal prosecutions ===
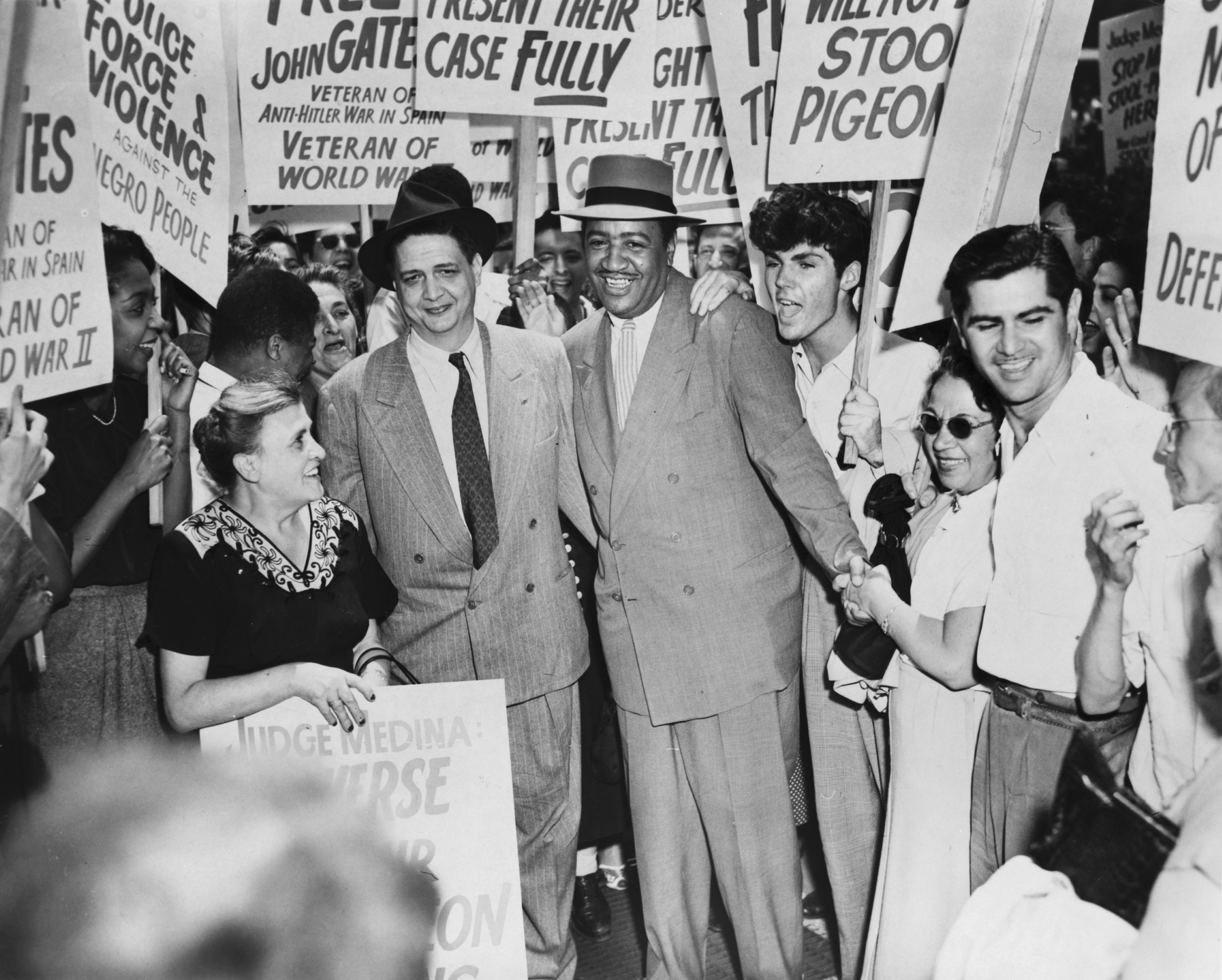
Robert G. Thompson and Benjamin J. Davis leaving the Foley Square Courthouse during the Smith Act trials of Communist Party leaders, 1949

When the Communist Party was formed in 1919, the United States government was engaged in prosecution of socialists who had opposed World War I and military service. This prosecution was continued in 1919 and January 1920 in the Palmer Raids as part of the First Red Scare. Rank and file foreign-born members of the Communist Party were targeted and as many as possible were arrested and deported while leaders were prosecuted and, in some cases, sentenced to prison terms. In the late 1930s, with the authorization of President Franklin D. Roosevelt, the FBI began investigating both domestic Nazis and Communists. In 1940, Congress passed the Smith Act, which made it illegal to advocate, abet, or teach the desirability of overthrowing the government.

In 1949, the federal government put Eugene Dennis, William Z. Foster and ten other Communist Party leaders on trial for advocating the violent overthrow of the government. Because the prosecution could not show that any of the defendants had openly called for violence or been involved in accumulating weapons for a proposed revolution, it relied on the testimony of former members of the party that the defendants had privately advocated the overthrow of the government and on quotations from the work of Marx, Lenin and other revolutionary figures of the past. During the course of the trial, the judge held several of the defendants and all of their counsel in contempt of court. All of the remaining eleven defendants were found guilty, and the Supreme Court upheld the constitutionality of their convictions by a 6–2 vote in Dennis v. United States, 341 U.S. 494 (1951). The government then proceeded with the prosecutions of more than 140 members of the party.

Panicked by these arrests and fearing that the party was dangerously compromised by informants, Dennis and other party leaders decided to go underground and to disband many affiliated groups. The move heightened the political isolation of the leadership while making it nearly impossible for the party to function. The widespread support of action against communists and their associates began to abate after Senator Joseph McCarthy overreached himself in the Army–McCarthy hearings, producing a backlash. The end of the Korean War in 1953 also led to a lessening of anxieties about subversion. The Supreme Court brought a halt to the Smith Act prosecutions in 1957 in its decision in Yates v. United States, 354 U.S. 298 (1957), which required that the government prove that the defendant had actually taken concrete steps toward the forcible overthrow of the government, rather than merely advocating it in theory.

=== African Americans ===
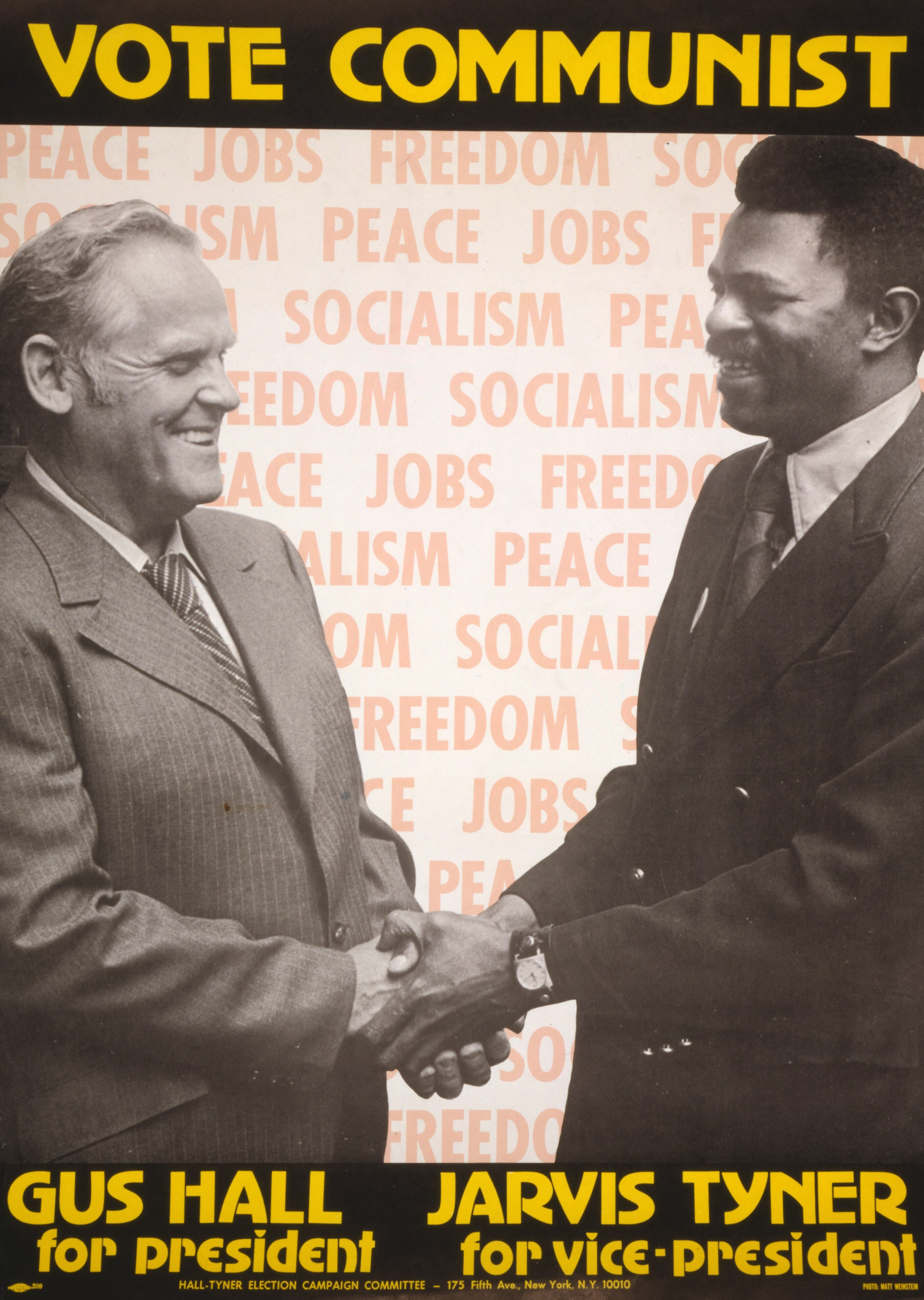
Presidential campaign poster, 1976

The Communist Party played a role in defending the rights of African Americans during its heyday in the 1930s and 1940s. The Alabama Chapter of the Communist Party USA helped organize the unemployed Black workers, the Alabama Sharecroppers' Union and numerous anti-lynching campaigns. Further, the Alabama chapter organized young activists that would later go on to be prominent members in the civil rights movement, such as Rosa Parks. Throughout its history several of the party's leaders and political thinkers have been African Americans. James Ford, Charlene Mitchell, Angela Davis and Jarvis Tyner, the current executive vice chair of the party, all ran as presidential or vice presidential candidates on the party ticket. Others like Benjamin J. Davis, William L. Patterson, Harry Haywood, James E. Jackson, Henry Winston, Claude Lightfoot, Alphaeus Hunton, Doxey Wilkerson, Claudia Jones, and John Pittman contributed in important ways to the party's approaches to major issues from human and civil rights, peace, women's equality, the national question, working class unity, socialist thought, cultural struggle, and more. African American thinkers, artists and writers such as Claude McKay, Richard Wright, Ann Petry, W. E. B. Du Bois, Shirley Graham Du Bois, Lloyd Brown, Charles White, Elizabeth Catlett, Paul Robeson, Gwendolyn Brooks, and others were one-time members or supporters of the party, and the Communist Party also had a close alliance with Harlem Congressman Adam Clayton Powell Jr.

=== Gay rights movement ===
Harry Hay developed his political views as an active member of the Communist Party. Hay founded in the early 1950s the Mattachine Society, America's second gay rights organization. However, gay rights were not seen as something the party should associate with organizationally. Many party members saw homosexuality as something done by those with fascist tendencies (following the lead of the Soviet Union in criminalizing the practice for that reason). Hay, along with all other homosexual members, were expelled from the party as an ideological risk, with leadership considering them "vulnerable to blackmail from the FBI." In 2004, more than a decade after the fall of the Soviet Union and after Russia had legalized male homosexual relations, the editors of Political Affairs published articles detailing their self-criticism of the party's early views of gay and lesbian rights and praised Hay's work.

The Communist Party endorsed LGBT rights in a 2005 statement. The party affirmed the resolution with a statement a year later in honor of gay pride month in June 2006.

=== United States peace movement ===
The Communist Party opposed United States involvement in the early stages of World War II (until the German invasion of the Soviet Union in June 1941), the Korean War, the Vietnam War, the invasion of Grenada, and American support for anti-communist military dictatorships and movements in Central America. Meanwhile, some in the peace movement and the New Left rejected the Communist Party for what it saw as the party's bureaucratic rigidity and for its close association with the Soviet Union.

The Communist Party was consistently opposed to the United States' 2003–2011 war in Iraq. United for Peace and Justice (UFPJ) includes the New York branch of the Communist Party as a member group, with Communist Judith LeBlanc serving as the co-chair of UFPJ from 2007 to 2009.

== Election results ==
=== Presidential tickets ===
Communist Party USA candidates for president and vice president
Year	President	Vice president	Votes	Percent	Name	Further info
1924	William Z. Foster	Benjamin Gitlow	38,669	0.1%	Workers Party of America	(convention)
1928	William Z. Foster	Benjamin Gitlow	48,551	0.1%	Workers (Communist); Party of America	(convention)
1932	William Z. Foster	James W. Ford	103,307	0.3%	Communist Party USA	(convention)
1936	Earl Browder	James W. Ford	79,315	0.2%	Communist Party USA	(convention)
1940	Earl Browder	James W. Ford	48,557	0.1%	Communist Party USA	(convention)
1948	No candidate; endorsed Henry Wallace	No candidate; endorsed Glen H. Taylor	N/A		Communist Party USA	
1952	No candidate; endorsed Vincent Hallinan	No candidate; endorsed Charlotta Bass	N/A		Communist Party USA	
1968	Charlene Mitchell	Michael Zagarell	1,077	<0.1%	Communist Party USA	(convention)
1972	Gus Hall	Jarvis Tyner	25,597	<0.1%	Communist Party USA	
1976	Gus Hall	Jarvis Tyner	58,709	0.1%	Communist Party USA	
1980	Gus Hall	Angela Davis	44,933	0.1%	Communist Party USA	
1984	Gus Hall	Angela Davis	36,386	<0.1%	Communist Party USA	

=== Best results in major races ===
Office	Percent	District	Year	Candidate
President	1.5%	Florida	1928	William Z. Foster
President	0.8%	Montana	1932	Earl Browder
President	0.6%	New York	1936	Earl Browder
U.S. Senate	3.6%	California	1940	Anita Whitney
U.S. Senate	3.3%	Virginia	1936	Donald Burke
U.S. Senate	2.8%	Virginia	1940	Alice Burke
U.S. House	13.6%	New York District 14	1940	Earl Browder
U.S. House	8.1%	Massachusetts District 8	1984	Laura Ross
U.S. House	7.3%	California District 5	1942	Walter Raymond Lambert

== Party leaders ==
Party leaders of the Communist Party USA
Name	Period	Title
Charles Ruthenberg	1919–1927	Executive Secretary of old CPA (1919–1920); Executive Secretary of WPA/W(C)P (May 1922 – 1927)
Alfred Wagenknecht	1919–1921	Executive Secretary of CLP (1919–1920); of UCP (1920–1921)
Charles Dirba	1920–1921	Executive Secretary of old CPA (1920–1921); of unified CPA (May 30, 1921 – July 27, 1921)
Louis Shapiro	1920	Executive Secretary of old CPA
L.E. Katterfeld	1921	Executive Secretary of unified CPA
William Weinstone	1921–1922	Executive Secretary of unified CPA
Jay Lovestone	1922; 1927–1929	Executive Secretary of unified CPA (February 22, 1922 – August 22, 1922); of W(C)P/CPUSA (1927–1929)
James P. Cannon	1921–1922	National Chairman of WPA
Caleb Harrison	1921–1922	Executive Secretary of WPA
Abram Jakira	1922–1923	Executive Secretary of unified CPA
William Z. Foster	1929–1945; 1945–1957	Party Chairman; General Secretary
Earl Browder	1932–1945	General Secretary
Eugene Dennis	1945–1961; 1957–1959	Party Chairman; General Secretary
Gus Hall	1959–2000	General Secretary
Elizabeth Gurley Flynn	1961–1964	Party Chairperson
Henry Winston	1966–1986	Party Chairman
Sam Webb	2000–2014	Chairman
John Bachtell	2014–2019	Chairman
Rossana Cambron	2019–present	Co-chair
Joe Sims	2019–present	Co-chair

== Notable CPUSA members ==
Well-known organizers and other members of the party
Name	Years active	Title	Notes
Peter Cacchione	1932–1947	Party Leader; New York City Councilman	Served as a member of the New York City Council from Brooklyn At-Large from 1942 to 1947, making him the first Communist to hold any elected office in the state of New York.
Angela Davis	1969–1991	Member, California Communist Party	A supporter of the Communist Party until the dissolution of the Soviet Union in 1991 following the revolutions of 1989, which ended communism in most countries worldwide. Davis then created the Committees of Correspondence for Democracy and Socialism, a former reformist faction within the Communist Party, which is now independent and promotes democratic socialism.
Benjamin J. Davis Jr.	1933–1964	Party Leader; New York City Councilman	Served as a member of the New York City Council from Manhattan At-Large from 1944 to 1949, making him the second and last Communist to hold any elected office in the state of New York.
Richard Durham	1940s	Member	Creator and writer of the Destination Freedom radio series in Chicago. Durham was a CPUSA member while writing for New Masses, the Chicago Defender, the Chicago Star, and the Illinois Standard newspapers.
Si Gerson	1928–2004	Party Leader; Confidential Examiner to the Borough President of Manhattan	Served as Confidential Examiner to the Borough President of Manhattan from 1938 to 1940, making him the first Communist to hold any appointed office in New York City. He was later an editor for the Daily Worker.
Dorothy Ray Healey	1920s–1973	Member, California Communist Party	An early supporter of the Communist Party, she became disillusioned with the leadership of Gus Hall and furthermore was against the Soviet invasion of Czechoslovakia in 1968. Healey criticized CPUSA orthodoxy after the crimes of Stalin were exposed by Nikita Khrushchev. She eventually left the party and joined the New America Movement, an organization promoting new-left activism.
Tupac Shakur	?	Member, Baltimore Young Communist League	Known for his career as a rapper and actor, Tupac Shakur was at one time a member of the Young Communist League in Baltimore. He found the platform of the party appealing, having grown up in poverty. Shakur also dated the daughter of the director of the local Communist Party.
Charles E. Taylor	?	Member, Montana Communist Party; State Senator	Started a left-wing newspaper called "Producers News" in Sheridan County, Montana after being sent there by the Nonpartisan League of North Dakota. The newspaper slandered members of the community, sparking a libel case and newspaper war.
Emma Tenayuca	1936–1939(?)	Party Organizer	Emma Tenayuca (December 21, 1916 – July 23, 1999), also known as Emma Beatrice Tenayuca, was an American labor leader, union organizer and educator. She is best known for her work organizing Mexican workers in Texas during the 1930s, particularly for leading the 1938 San Antonio pecan shellers strike.

== See also ==
- CPUSA history:
  - List of Communist Party USA election results
  - List of Communist Party USA members who have held office in the United States
  - National conventions of the Communist Party USA
  - Press of the Communist Party USA (annotated list of titles): English-language and Non-English
  - Communist Party USA and African Americans
  - Communist Party USA and the American labor movement: 1919–1937 and 1937–1950
- CPUSA-associated organizations:
  - Young Communist League USA
  - W.E.B. Du Bois Clubs of America
  - Young Pioneers of America
  - International Publishers
  - Language federation
- Later communist organizations:
  - Progressive Labor Party (United States)
  - Revolutionary Communist Party, USA
  - Socialist Workers Party (United States)
- History of Soviet espionage in the United States
- Jencks v. United States
