= Fetter (disambiguation) =

A fetter is a type of leg restraint.

Fetter or Fetters may also refer to:

- Fetter (Buddhism), Buddhist concept of mental fetter
- Fetter (surname)
- Fetters (surname)
- Fetter v. Beale, 1697 lawsuit about the crime of mayhem
- Fetter Lane, in London
- Fetter Schrier Hoblitzell (1838–1900), American politician
- Hughes v. Fetter, 1951 American lawsuit
- Fetters (film), a 1961 Czech drama film

== See also ==
- Fort Fetter, Pennsylvania
