= Vetter =

Origin
- Language: German
- Meaning: cousin
- Region of origin: Germany

Other names
- Variant forms: Vetterlein, Vetterle, Vettermann, Vetters, Vetterer

Vetter is a German language surname, which means "cousin". Notable people with the surname include:

== People ==
- Anouk Vetter (born 1993), Dutch athlete
- Austin Anthony Vetter (born 1967), American Roman Catholic bishop
- Brian Vetter (born 1985), American lacrosse player
- Conrad Vetter (1547–1622), German writer
- Craig Vetter (born 1942), American businessman
- Daniel Strejc-Vetterus (1592–1669?), Czech priest, author
- Darci Vetter (born 1974), American diplomat
- David Vetter (1971–1984), American; first germ-free human
- Fred W. Vetter Jr. (1921–2002), American general
- Günter Vetter (1936–2022), Austrian politician
- Helmut Vetter (1910–1949), German Nazi SS officer at Auschwitz concentration camp executed for war crimes
- Hermann Vetter (born 1933), German translator
- Jessica Vetter (born 1985), American ice hockey player
- Johannes Vetter (born 1993), German athlete
- Karl Vetter (1895–????), German politician
- Louis F. Vetter (1857–1923), American businessman
- Michael Vetter (1943–2013), German composer and artist
- Nicolaus Vetter (1666–1734), German musician
- Richard Vetter (1919–2000), German inventor
- Stephanie Vetter (1884–1974), Belgian writer

== Other uses ==
- Vetter Fairing Company, an American manufacturer of motorcycle accessories
- Vetter Mountain, California
- Vetter Peak, British Columbia
- Vetter Pharma, a German pharmaceutical company

== See also ==
- Fett
- Fetter (disambiguation)
- Vater
- Vette
- Wetter (surname)
