= Vett =

Vett may refer to:

== People ==
- Emil Vett (1843–1911), Danish businessman
- Vilhelm Vett (1879–1962), Danish sailor and Olympian

== Other uses ==
- Vett, a character in the Canadian animated television series RollBots

== See also ==
- The Del-Vetts, a 1963 American garage rock band
- Micro-Vett, a former Italian electric vehicle manufacturer
- Vet (disambiguation)
- Vette (disambiguation)
