= United States v. Williams =

United States v. Williams may refer to any of the following United States Supreme Court decisions:

- United States v. Williams (1880), 154 U.S., Appx. 652 (1880)
- United States v. Williams (1906), 188 U.S. 485
- United States v. Williams (1929), 278 U.S. 255 (1929)
- United States v. Williams (1937), 302 U.S. 46 (1937)
- United States v. Williams (1951), 341 U.S. 70 (1951), holding that a federal statute against conspiracy to deprive an individual of rights under color of law applied only to the federal government
- United States v. Williams (1992), 504 U.S. 36 (1992), holding that the federal courts do not have the supervisory power to require prosecutors to present exculpatory evidence to the grand jury
- United States v. Williams (1995), 514 U.S. 227 (1995)
- United States v. Williams (2008), 553 U.S. 285 (2008), involving the constitutionality of a federal statute prohibiting the pandering of child pornography
