= Draug (disambiguation) =

Draug or draugr most often refers to Draugr, a type of undead in Nordic folklore.

They may also refer to:

- Draug (film), movie from 2018
- Draug (role-playing game), Norwegian role-playing game
- PSR B1257+12 A, an exoplanet, also named Draugr
