= I Want to Be a Vet =

I Want to Be a Vet may refer to:

- "I Want to Be a Vet", an episode of the television series Little Princess
- "I Want to Be a Vet", an episode of the television series Teletubbies

== See also ==
- Vet (disambiguation)
