= 1928 Workers (Communist) National Convention =

- 1928 presidential election
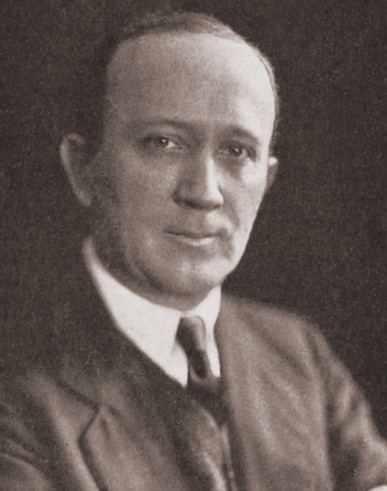
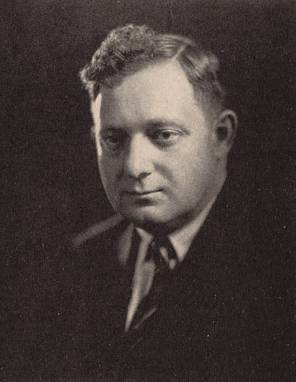
- Nominees (Foster and Gitlow)

Convention
- Dates: May 25–27, 1928
- City: New York City, New York
- Venue: Mecca Temple

Candidates
- Presidential nominee: William Z. Foster of Massachusetts
- Vice-presidential nominee: Benjamin Gitlow of New York

The 1928 Workers (Communist) National Convention was held May 25–27 at the Mecca Temple in New York City. The Workers (Communist) Party, an "overground" political party of Communist Party USA, nominated William Z. Foster for president and Benjamin Gitlow for vice president. This was the same ticket that it had also nominated four years prior.

== Logistics ==
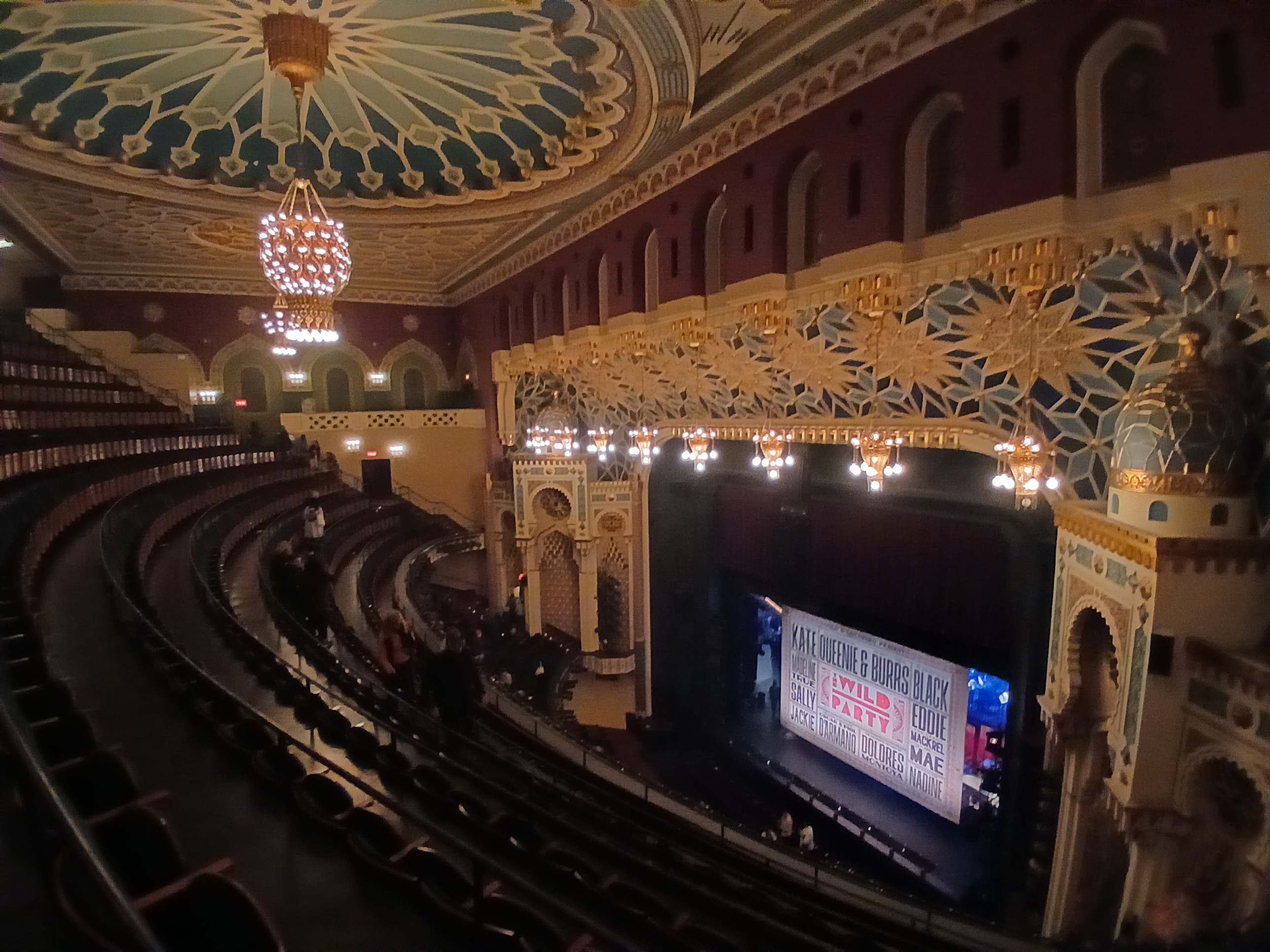
New York City Center (former Mecca Temple), venue of the convention

The convention was held May 25–27 at the Mecca Temple in New York City. It was the party's second-ever presidential nominating convention.

== Proceedings ==
Jay Lovestone served as the convention's keynote speaker, and delivered a speech the Democratic, Republican and Socialist parties. His speech also claimed that the Communists would react to the next "imperialist war" by the United States by turning it into a civil war.

== Nominations ==
Party Chair William Z. Foster was named as the party's nominee for the presidency while Benjamin Gitlow (a former opponent of Foster's within the party) was named as its nominee for vice president. This was the same ticket that the party had nominated in 1928.

Scott Nearing had also been considered a possible contender for either position on ticket, but was not nominated.

== Platform ==
A platform was adopted at the convention, which was published as a 64 page pamphlet under the title The Platform of the Class Struggle. In addition to calling for American workers to overthrow the capitalistic system of government, the platform also demanded the enactment of social insurance, the repeal of the Eighteenth Amendment and the Volstead Act, a five-hour workday, the withdrawal of troops from Nicaragua and China, and the recognition of the Soviet Union.
