= Draug (role-playing game) =

Norwegian fantasy role-playing game

- Cover of the Draug rulebook
- Designers: Matthijs Holter
- Publishers: Spartacus
- Publication: 2004
- Genres: Historical, Fantasy
- Systems: FUDGE

Draug is a Norwegian supernatural horror role-playing game (RPG) published by Spartacus Forlag in 2004. It is heavily inspired by folklore and history of Norway, and is set in the early 1800s.

== Contents ==
Draug (named after a type of fictional Scandinavian undead), is set in a semi-historically accurate Norway of 1801 that features supernatural creatures from Norwegian fairy tales. The game, which uses the FUDGE game system, is designed for 1–5 players and a gamemaster.

The players create characters who have ten traits or abilities (two of them great, three of them good, and five of them only fair). The characters are ordinary people who are plagued by supernatural creatures such as nøkken, hulder, vetter, trolls, and nisser. The game focuses on cooperative problem-solving rather than combat.

Most of the illustrations in the book are by Norwegian artists of the 1800s and early 1900s, such as Gunnar Berg, Theodor Kittelsen, Otto Sinding, and Adolph Tidemand. The cover illustration is made by Robert Elneskog.

== Publication history ==
Draug was created by Matthijs Holter in 2004 and was published by Spartacus Forlag as a 240-page book that is divided into information for players, information for the gamemaster, and several adventures. It was the first RPG to be based on Norwegian history and beliefs.

The following year, Holter followed up with the first supplement, Beist og borgerskap ("Beast and Bourgoisie"), a 73-page book of three adventures with three different modes of play:

- "Festligheter på Fladebye" ("Festival at Fladebye") is a murder mystery set in high society.
- "Uren, Luren" ("Up in the Hills") is a narrativisic adventure inspired by Norwegian folk tales collected by Asbjørnsen and Moe.
- "Jern-Katja" ("Iron Katja") is a horror adventure set in a rural environment with a tragedy in its past.

== Reception ==
In a review for the Norwegian newspaper VG, Brynjulf Jung Tjønn liked the game, saying, "With the help of some dice and a book of 240 pages, you can make Norway a free country in the 19th century."

In a review for the Norwegian magazine Universitas, "Vegard Den Lokale Uteliggeren" (transl. "Vegard, the local homeless", the anonymous critic's player character in Draug) complimented the game on its simplicity, saying, "The rules are simple and easy to understand, and you apparently do not need a calculator or nerd skills to play." Vegard did caution that "It is possible that it will only become really interesting if you are interested in history and folklore." Vegard also thought that the game occasionally veered too close to mundane, noting that "Some of the environmental descriptions in Draug are dangerously reminiscent of what one finds in an average school book, but the game is saved by the captivating thought of having to play through Norwegian history where in a dramatic moment the national assembly at Eidsvoll rescues an evil Danish Santa with poisoned porridge." Vegard concluded with a strong recommendation, saying, "[The game] requires a little more advance work, and it can be a little stressful at first to pretend to be a crowded outcast or a hard-working Haugian widow, but in the right surroundings - for example cabin trips in the Norwegian mountains - it should quickly become fun. Anyone who can think of a creative alternative to Ludo or Monopoly should try Draug.""

Writing for the Norwegian magazine Adresseavisen, Tone Almhjell said, "This is brilliant entertainment. (…) There is so much inspiration here that should last for years of fun."

== Other reviews ==
- RPG Review June 2011 (Issue 12)
