= Breard v. City of Alexandria =

- Supreme Court of the United States

Argued March 7–8, 1951 Decided June 4, 1951
- Full case name: Jack H. Breard v. City of Alexandria, LA
- Citations: 341 U.S. 622 (more) 71 S. Ct. 920; 95 L. Ed. 2d 1233

Court membership
- Chief Justice Fred M. Vinson Associate Justices Hugo Black · Stanley F. Reed; Felix Frankfurter · William O. Douglas; Robert H. Jackson · Harold H. Burton; Tom C. Clark · Sherman Minton

Case opinions
- Majority: Reed, joined by Frankfurter, Jackson, Burton, Clark, Minton
- Dissent: Vinson, joined by Douglas
- Dissent: Black, joined by Douglas

Laws applied
- U.S. Const. amend. I

Breard v. City of Alexandria, 341 U.S. 622 (1951), was a United States Supreme Court case, which held that door-to-door solicitation could be restricted without violating the Due Process Clause, the First Amendment or the Commerce Clause.

== Background ==
Jack H. Breard was a regional representative for Keystone Readers Services, Inc. Breard was arrested for going door-to-door in the City of Alexandria, Louisiana soliciting magazine subscriptions. Breard was arrested for violating an ordinance that required him to get permission from the owners of the residences where he was soliciting.

== Opinion of the Court ==
The case went all the way to the Supreme Court, which ruled the Breard's First Amendment Rights were not violated and that door-to-door solicitation could be restricted without unduly interfering with interstate commerce, and without violating Due Process.

Justice Reed's majority opinion said that the state police power to regulate soliciting does not unreasonably burden or conflict with the due process freedom to engage in legitimate business: "The problem is legislative where there are reasonable bases for legislative action".

In a dissenting opinion, Justice Black held that the decision went against recent doctrine. Vinson and Douglas wrote another dissenting opinion, calling the ordinance "flat prohibition" and arguing that it discriminated against interstate commerce because it made an exception for local farm products.
