= Alabama Chapter of the Communist Party USA =

- Abbreviation: ACCPUSA; AC-CPUSA
- Founded: 1928
- Dissolved: 1951
- Ideology: Communism
- Political position: Far-left

The Alabama Chapter of the Communist Party USA (CPUSA) was one of the most influential political bodies organizing poor African-Americans in the South during and after the Great Depression. Started with just two members, the Alabama chapter CPUSA was established in Birmingham Alabama in 1928, and remained active until it was forced underground by Ku Klux Klan (KKK) and police repression, and was disbanded when it was outlawed in 1951. During the height of Jim Crow and the Great Depression, the Alabama CPUSA organized some of the poorest African-American communities in the country, and was successful in leading organization drives in multiple industries including the Sharecroppers' Union, mine, mill, and industrial workers, as well as leading numerous campaigns to organize unemployed workers. The Alabama CPUSA also played a vital role in organizing African-Americans during a period where many activists would later become leaders of the emerging Civil Rights Movement. Ashbury Howard, who later was a significant leader in Alabama during the Civil Rights Movement, and Rosa Parks, who would later commit an act of civil disobedience launching the Montgomery Bus Boycott, were both trained and active with the Alabama CPUSA.

== Background ==
Cheap labor, made capital investments in Alabama extremely profitable in the early 20th century. Despite mineral deposits being buried deep, insufficient water supply, and low metallic content, cheap labor made the Birmingham Industrial Complex a region known as the "Pittsburgh of the South." Labor costs were so cheap, by 1910, the market made Birmingham Alabama one of the least costly industrial centers in the country for investors. As a result, by 1910, just 1 percent of individuals in the region had a net worth of over $35,000, while 80 percent earned under $500 per annum.

Consequently, interlocking directorships made it possible for a small minority of wealthy aristocrats to take control of local politics, dominate elected officials, and control the economy of the region. Further, control over the real estate, banking, and mining industries became centralized bringing large fortunes into the hands of less than 1 percent of the population. Industrialists spent their vast wealth lavishly while developing a strong class consciousness. One capitalist even went so far as to build his home as a replica of an ancient Roman temple.

Simultaneously, in what was known as the "valley of furnaces," the working poor struggled to survive. By 1900, African Americans made up 55 percent of Alabama’s coal miners, and 65 percent of its iron and steel workers. In total, African Americans made over 90 percent of Birmingham’s unskilled labor Force by 1910, and by 1920, Black women made up 60 percent of female workers, 87 percent of which were engaged in domestic work.

This development made Birmingham one of the largest Black urban centers in the New South, and as such, Segregation and disfranchisement ordinances were rampant. Between By 1901, African Americans disfranchisement reduced the Black voting population from 100,000 to roughly 3,700. Between 1900 and 1905, African American the community was segregated into smaller enclaves. With communities pushed to creek beds, railroad lines, and alleys near the downtown area, the African American community was effectively segregated and splintered. According to the US Census, illiteracy among non whites did drop substantially across the country from 1900 to 1940 from 44 percent to 11 percent. However in rural Alabama, illiteracy among Blacks by 1940 was still between 30 and 40 percent among sharecroppers and farm workers. With the conditions as they were, the Communist international decided to send organizers to the region.

=== History of the Alabama Chapter of the Communist Party USA ===
In 1928, at the Sixth World Congress of the Communist International, an association of international communists, established the official line on the "Negro Question." Being that the region of the American South was dominated by cotton plantations and rich white elites despite a numerical black majority, the entire region would be defined as an "oppressed nation." The adopted resolution maintained that as an oppressed nation, African Americans had the right to self determination, (the control over political power as well as the economy,) and as such had the right to secede of the United States. In 1930, the resolution was further defined to account for the material differences between the North and South. The new resolution took the position that Northern Blacks sought integration and assimilation giving Blacks in the South the exclusive right to secession.

While it had been argued that South was impenetrable to radical politics and organizing, the Central Committee of the CPUSA chose Birmingham, the industrial center of the South, for the location of their headquarters for their newly establish District 17 chapter. This district encompassed, Alabama, Georgia, Louisiana, Florida, Tennessee, and Mississippi. The first two full time organizers sent to Birmingham were Tom Johnson and Harry Jackson. Both Johnson and Jackson were veteran white Communists, and both had been active trade union organizers in the North. While Johnson had worked in Cleveland, Jackson had previously spent years as a longshoreman in San Francisco. Consequently in 1929, the Party opened an office in downtown Birmingham at 2117 ½ Second Ave. North. However, it was closed shortly after.

From 1928 to 1951, the Alabama Chapter CPUSA played its most important roles in terms of organizing and fighting against unemployment and the development of the Alabama Sharecroppers Union, a court case involving a group of falsely imprisoned Black youths known as the Scottsboro Case, and for basic civil rights such as voting, to sit on juries, as well as housing and employment equality. At the Seventh National Convention in 1930, the Party elected to focus their efforts campaign drives and organizing unemployed Black workers.

=== The Fight Against Unemployment ===
The fight against unemployment was a multifaceted struggle for jobs, monetary relief, and an end to evictions. Due to lack of jobs and unemployment, one of the most immediate result was mass evictions. The Party organized numerous mass actions and protests in an effort to organize and raise money to provide relief to starving workers. One protest leaflet read, "white and colored workers are being evicted from their homes and thrown out on the streets to shift for themselves. Gas and water is [sic] being cut off because the unemployed workers can not pay their bills." One Metal Workers Industrial League mass meeting was planned to organize unemployed steel workers and call for an end to evictions, immediate relief, free light and heat for the city's jobless, and to reaffirm their support for a Communist-sponsored social insurance bill that proposed minimum cash assistance of $25 per week to all unemployed. The protest drew over 2,500 people. However, it was postponed when Harry Jackson was detained by police. On December 16, 1930, an eighteen-year-old black Young Communist League (YCL) activist, Joe Burton, took leadership of a spontaneous protest demonstration of over 5,000 workers. Burton attempted to lead demonstrators in an action to storm the lobby of Hotel Morris and demand jobs or immediate relief, but police intervened and dispersed the protest.

The Party also took a leading role in organizing unemployment committees and councils that through direct action helped prevent evictions and restore utilities of poor and working families. As depression-era unemployment affected women and domestic workers tremendously, Black women took major roles in organizing and leadership. Led mostly by Black women, relief committees presented their demands directly to the welfare board on an individual basis. Additionally, the Party-based committees led struggles against evictions and foreclosures by a range of tactics from flooding landlords with postcards and letters, to direct confrontational reasoning. In the event a poor family lost access to utilities, activists and Party council members would use heavy gauged copper wires known as "jumpers" to "appropriate" electricity from public outlets or other homes.

=== The Alabama Share Croppers Union ===
In the 1930s, the Alabama Chapter CPUSA began organizing the poverty stricken rural Black sharecroppers. As cotton prices plummeted after the first World War, planters were forced to reduce acreage. With rising debts, when the stock market collapsed and cotton prices reached an all time low, small landholders were forced into tenancy and tenant's conditions deteriorated even worse. In the South, the most common form of tenancy was sharecropping. Propertyless workers paid their land owners with a portion of the crops they raised. Consequently, they were forced to raise the land owners' desired crop which meant they could not grow their own food. Because most landowners sold cotton, the sharecroppers were forced to grow cotton, and as prices dropped they went further and further into debt. All tools, animals, food, and cash advances were considered "furnishings" and deducted from the sharecropper’s portion of the crop with interest. Black sharecroppers lived in one or two room shacks, usually without running water. Most shacks were not equipped with sanitary facilities, and the day to day diet consisted of beans, molasses, and cornbread causing both sickness and malnutrition. Plagued with sickness, illiteracy, and extreme poverty, most sharecroppers were forced to beg for food and cash advances and or spent numerous days without eating. As a result, the Alabama CPUSA took a leading role in the administration and organizing of the Alabama Sharecroppers Union (ASU), and by 1932 the ASU had between six hundred and eight hundred members.

The ASU organized numerous demands. First, in the face of farm and mill owners' attempts to cut wages and suspend food advancements, the ASU called for the continuation of advances to sharecroppers. Secondly, the ASU demanded that sharecroppers have full autonomy and control over surplus crops to sell at market. In response to sharecroppers being required to purchase food from the land owners, the ASU demanded that croppers be given individual plots to grow their own food. Additionally, the ASU demanded that sharecroppers be paid in cash instead of food advances that many times plunged the croppers further in debt. For their children, the ASU demanded education. Before it was dissolved into the Farmers Union of Alabama, in 1936, the ASU had represented nearly 10,000 workers.

=== The Scottsboro Case ===
The Alabama CPUSA also played a leading role in organizing around a case that would be known as the "Scottsboro Case" in 1931. During the Jim Crow Era in the South, there were many cases of wrongful arrest, lynching, and trumped up trials. On March 25, 1931, a number of white and black youths were hopping trains, looking for work, when a fight broke out. The white hobos were thrown from the train and subsequently reported the event to the trainmaster. At the next stop, the police rounded up nine black youths and charged them with assault. When it was discovered that two white women were on the train, the police threatened the women with arrest if they did not testify that the nine Black youths had sexually assaulted them. The nine youths were then charged with sexual assault. The all-white jury convicted the group of youths, and all except the youngest, who was twelve years old, were sentenced to death. The International Labor Defense organization ran by CPUSA took charge of the case from there, and organized a two-pronged battle against the conviction free of charge. While a legal defense team worked to successfully overthrow the case in court, the streets were flooded with protests, demonstrations, and struggle. On April 12 and 13, mass demonstrations were held in Cleveland and New York City. In Cleveland, over thirteen thousand people attended, while in NYC, over twenty thousand protesters took to the streets to condemn the "Scottsboro Frame-up." Subsequently, after numerous court battles and a retrial, all but one member were freed.

=== Backlash from Police and The Ku Klux Klan ===
The Alabama Chapter of CPUSA was subjected to numerous attacks by both the Ku Klux Klan as well as police forces including bombings, lynchings, vigilantism, and murder. Just a few weeks after opening their office in Birmingham, on March 23, 1930, the ACPUSA held a meeting attended by over two hundred people, mostly Black. While the meeting went without incident, several days later, the home of James Giglio, a metal worker and organizer for the Party, was firebombed.

During their first summer in Birmingham, seven hundred Black workers took to the streets with about one hundred white workers gathering in Capitol Park to demand unemployment relief as well as to protest the arrests of six Communist organizers. As the demonstrators marched to Chest headquarters, they were met with over one hundred police officers and disbanded. Consequently, city commissioner Jimmie Jones conducted a full scale investigation. As a result, a public ordinance against "criminal anarchy," was passed unanimously by the city commission on June 17, 1930. The ordinance specifically attacked anyone associating with the Communist Party, the printing of Communist or radical agitation. Violation of the ordinance was punishable by $100 and up to 180 days in jail. This prompted police to conduct raids and constant harassment, which resulted in several convictions.

In response to the Party's leadership in a wave of strikes in 1934, and their large demonstrations on International Workers' Day (May Day), under the orders from Birmingham police Chied E.L Hollums, the police formed a squad known as "The Red Squad," and conducted a mass wave of retaliatory raids. Nearly a dozen Communists were arrested on various charges from vagrancy to criminal anarchy. Throughout the summer, police raids, repression, and mass arrests continued. However, the fines were typically quickly paid, the charges dropped or reduced, and, in the end, were not effective in stopping the Party from organizing. In fact, in many ways, the heightened police repression only fueled the Party, gave them national attention, and even piqued the interests of the American Civil Liberties Union (ACLU).

In 1931, after a spontaneous uprising of sharecroppers in Arkansas, the Alabama CPUSA began extensive organizing campaigns around local farmers. By this time the ASU and Croppers Farm Workers Union (CFWU) had been organizing sharecroppers for years, and had militantly secured a few local victories with about eight hundred members. However, in Camp Hill, Alabama, after a meeting to discuss the Scottsboro case, the CFWU was raided by local organized deputized vigilantes. During the raid both women and men were beaten before the group left and regrouped at the main organizer, Tommy Gray’s, home assaulting his entire family, including his wife who suffered a fractured skull. The mob was only stopped when Tommy’s brother Ralph Gray ran into the house armed, preventing fatal consequences. At a subsequent meeting, Sherriff Young, police Chief JM Wilson, and his deputy AJ Thomson showed up and a confrontation followed. While accounts differ as to the sequence of events, the encounter ended with a heated argument between Ralph Gray and the chief that resulted with each being shot. In response a vigilante mob was organized and deputized by Chief Wilson that stormed Gray’s home, and shot Gray in an execution by putting a pistol in his mouth. The mob then burned the home to the ground and dumped Gray’s body on the steps of the Dadeville courthouse.

As a result of the incident, thirty to fifty-five Black men were arrested, nine of which were under eighteen. The charges ranged from conspiracy to murder, to carrying a concealed weapon, to assault. With many of the CFWU organizers in jail and relations deteriorating, on August 6, 1931, the last remnants of the CFWU regrouped as the Share Croppers Union (SCU). Harry Hirsch, using the pseudonym "Harry Simms," played a liaison role between the Party leadership and the SCU. As the SCU grew in 1931 to 591 members, Tommy Gray’s daughter Eula Gray played a leading role in both the Young Communist League (YCL) as well as the SCU.

In 1934, The Ku Klux Klan saw a massive increase in membership in Northern Alabama. Over forty new Klaverns were organized. Additionally, a local fascist movement began organizing in conjunction with the Klan. The fascists ran a publication known as the Alabama Black Shirt. By the end of 1934, extrajudicial acts of vigilante violence and terrorism against Black workers, Communists, and radical circles increased significantly. Many times, violence, vigilantism, and lynching were the result of Klan and police alliances. One Communist, Clyde Johnson, survived at least three assassination attempts. Steve Simmons, a Black Communist, only barely survived an attempted lynching by the Klan. Saul Davis, another Black Communist, was kidnaped, stripped, and beaten by flogging for hours.
