= Doxey Alphonso Wilkerson =

American Civil Rights activist and educator

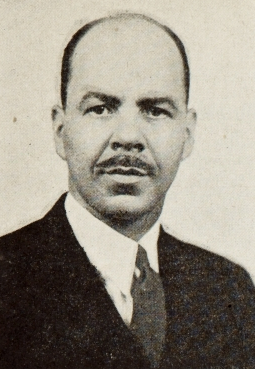
- Wilkerson c. 1944
- Born: Doxey Alphonso Lewis Alexander Wilkerson; April 24, 1905; Excelsior Springs, Missouri, U.S.
- Died: June 17, 1993 (aged 88)
- Education: University of Kansas (B.A., M.A.)
- Occupation: Educator
- Organization: Communist Party USA

Doxey Alphonso Wilkerson (April 24, 1905 – June 17, 1993) was an American educator, Marxist, civil rights activist, and Communist Party spokesman. Wilkerson retired from the Communist Party in 1957, remaining active in the Civil Rights Movement of the 1960s.

== Early life ==
Wilkerson was born in Excelsior Springs, Missouri to Mattie L. Wilkerson of Kentucky (1884–1955) and Methodist minister Alphonso Wilkerson. He attended Sumner High School in Kansas City, Kansas, and graduated in 1921.

== Career ==
He attended the University of Kansas, where he received a B.A in English in 1926 and a M.A. in education in 1927. He worked at Howard University as an associate professor of education from 1935 to 1943. During his tenure at Howard University, he served as a Research Associate for the Roosevelt administration's Advisory Committee on Education and as an Education Specialist at the Office of Price Administration. Wilkerson was the vice president of the American Federation of Teachers union from 1937 to 1941.

In addition to teaching at Howard University, Wilkerson taught at Yeshiva University. Wilkerson continued educational and civil rights works until his retirement in 1984.
