= Vette =

Vette may refer to:

== Automobiles ==
- Chevrolet Corvette, a sports car manufactured by GM since 1953
- Chevrolet Chevette, a subcompact car manufactured by GM for model years 1976-1987

== Entertainment ==
- Vette!, a 1989 racing video game
- Vette (Star Wars), a character in Star Wars: The Old Republic

== Other uses ==
- Vette Hundred, a hundred of Sweden
- Vicky Vette (born 1965), Norwegian pornographic actress

== See also ==
- Vet (disambiguation)
- Vett (disambiguation)
- Vættir or vetter, creatures in Nordic folklore
