= Fetter (surname) =

Fetter is a surname. Notable people with the surname include:

- Alexander Fetter (born 1937), American physicist
- Chris Fetter (born 1985), American baseball coach
- Ellen Fetter, American computer scientist
- Erik Fetter (born 2000), Hungarian cyclist
- Frank Fetter (1863–1949), American economist and professor
- György Fetter (born 1963), Hungarian sprinter
- Leigh Ann Fetter (born 1969), American swimmer
- Ted Fetter (1906–1996), Broadway lyricist
- Trevor Fetter, American businessman
- William Fetter (1928–2002), American graphic designer

== See also ==
- Fetters (surname)
