= List of United States Supreme Court cases, volume 341 =

This is a list of all the United States Supreme Court cases from volume 341 of the United States Reports:

Case name	Citation	Date decided
United States v. Allied Oil Corp.	341 U.S. 1	1951
American Fire & Casualty Co. v. Finn	341 U.S. 6	1951
West Virginia ex rel. Dyer v. Sims	341 U.S. 22	1951
Robertson v. Chambers	341 U.S. 37	1951
Moser v. United States	341 U.S. 41	1951
United States v. Alcea Band	341 U.S. 48	1951
Shepherd v. Florida	341 U.S. 50	1951
Gerende v. Board of Supervisors	341 U.S. 56	1951
United States v. Williams (1951)	341 U.S. 58	1951
United States v. Williams (1951)	341 U.S. 70	1951
Williams v. United States	341 U.S. 97	1951
California Automobile Ass'n v. Maloney	341 U.S. 105	1951
Woodward v. United States	341 U.S. 112	1951
United States v. Pewee Coal Co.	341 U.S. 114	1951
Joint Anti-Fascist Refugee Comm. v. McGrath	341 U.S. 123	1951
Bowman Dairy Co. v. United States	341 U.S. 214	1951
Jordan v. de George	341 U.S. 223	1951
Montana-Dakota Util. Co. v. Northwestern Pub. Serv. Co.	341 U.S. 246	1951
Mosser v. Darrow	341 U.S. 267	1951
Elder v. Brannan	341 U.S. 277	1951
United States v. Champlin Refining Co.	341 U.S. 290	1951
United States v. Wheelock Bros., Inc.	341 U.S. 319	1951
Ewing v. Gardner	341 U.S. 321	1951
NLRB v. Highland Park Mfg. Co.	341 U.S. 322	1951
Panhandle E. Pipe Line Co. v. Michigan Pub. Serv. Comm'n	341 U.S. 329	1951
Alabama Pub. Serv. Comm'n v. S.R. Co. I	341 U.S. 341	1951
Alabama Pub. Serv. Comm'n v. S.R. Co. II	341 U.S. 363	1951
Tenney v. Brandhove	341 U.S. 367	1951
Schwegmann Bros. v. Calvert Distillers Corp.	341 U.S. 384	1951
Radio Corp. v. United States	341 U.S. 412	1951
Standard Oil Co. v. New Jersey	341 U.S. 428	1951
Zittman v. McGrath I	341 U.S. 446	1951
Zittman v. McGrath II	341 U.S. 471	1951
McCloskey v. McGrath	341 U.S. 475	1951
Hoffman v. United States	341 U.S. 479	1951
Hammerstein v. Superior Ct.	341 U.S. 491	1951
Dennis v. United States	341 U.S. 494	1951
Timken Roller Bearing Co. v. United States	341 U.S. 593	1951
Hughes v. Fetter	341 U.S. 609	1951
Breard v. City of Alexandria	341 U.S. 622	1951
Collins v. Hardyman	341 U.S. 651	1951
NLRB v. International Rice Milling Co.	341 U.S. 665	1951
NLRB v. Denver Bldg. & Constr. Trades Council	341 U.S. 675	1951
Electrical Workers v. NLRB	341 U.S. 694	1951
Carpenters v. NLRB	341 U.S. 707	1951
Garner v. Board of Public Works	341 U.S. 716	1951
Land v. Dollar	341 U.S. 737	1951
