= Hughes v. Fetter =

- Supreme Court of the United States

Argued March 1–2, 1951 Decided June 4, 1951
- Full case name: Hughes v. Fetter
- Citations: 341 U.S. 609 (more) 71 S. Ct. 980; 95 L. Ed. 2d 1212

Court membership
- Chief Justice Fred M. Vinson Associate Justices Hugo Black · Stanley F. Reed; Felix Frankfurter · William O. Douglas; Robert H. Jackson · Harold H. Burton; Tom C. Clark · Sherman Minton

Case opinions
- Majority: Black
- Dissent: Frankfurter, joined by Reed, Jackson, Minton

Hughes v. Fetter, 341 U.S. 609 (1951), is a Supreme Court case involving the conflict of laws between states.

== Facts ==
Harold Hughes, a resident of Wisconsin, was killed in an automobile accident while driving in Illinois. The other driver, Fetter, was also a Wisconsin resident, and Fetter's insurance company was also located in Wisconsin. The administrator of Hughes' estate filed a wrongful death claim in Wisconsin state court, alleging that the death was caused by negligence on Fetter's part.

Although the administrator's action was filed in Wisconsin, and the defendants were a Wisconsin resident and a Wisconsin-based insurance company, the suit was based on the Illinois wrongful death statute. The trial court granted summary judgment on the merits to the defendants, holding that the public policy of Wisconsin, which had a "door-closing" statute with respect to wrongful death actions, which expressly limited the courts to compensating deaths occurring in Wisconsin. This was affirmed by the Wisconsin Supreme Court, and the administrator then filed a petition for certiorari in the U.S. Supreme Court, asserting that the Full Faith and Credit Clause of the United States Constitution required the Wisconsin courts to apply Illinois law.

== Decision ==
The U.S. Supreme Court reversed, holding that because Wisconsin's statutory policy would exclude the Illinois cause of action, the public policy asserted violated the national policy of giving Full Faith and Credit to the laws of other states. The Court found that the Illinois wrongful death statute is a "public act", and that Full Faith and Credit shall be given in each state to the "public acts" of every other state. The Court noted that Wisconsin enforced wrongful death suits under its own law, and therefore evinced no strong public policy against such claims that would justify excluding them from its courts.

A dissenting opinion by Justice Frankfurter, joined by three other justices, argued that states should be able to close their courts to foreign causes of action where there is a reasonable basis to do so. Frankurter believed there was such a basis here, because the suit could have been brought in Illinois, and because there were substantial differences in the wrongful death laws of the two states.

The Court was unclear about what the objectionable discrimination really was, between the imposition of the law of another state, or the fact that the case involved an accident in another state. It has been noted that the Court also "allowed for an indeterminate exception to the Hughes rule" in circumstances "when the forum did have an antipathy to the foreign claim".

== Impact ==
Hughes is considered the leading case on the constitutionality of door-closing statutes.
