= United States v. Williams (1951) =

- Supreme Court of the United States

Argued January 8, 1951 Decided April 23, 1951
- Full case name: United States v. Jay G. Williams et al.
- Citations: 341 U.S. 70 (more) 71 S. Ct. 581; 95 L. Ed. 758

Case history
- Prior: Williams v. United States, 179 F.2d 644 (5th Cir. 1950)

Holding
- An allegation where individuals acted under color of State law in an indictment under § 241 does not extend the protection of the section to rights that the US Constitution guarantees against only abridgment by the states. (affirming 5th Circuit)

Court membership
- Chief Justice Fred M. Vinson Associate Justices Hugo Black · Stanley F. Reed; Felix Frankfurter · William O. Douglas; Robert H. Jackson · Harold H. Burton; Tom C. Clark · Sherman Minton

Case opinions
- Majority: Frankfurter, joined by Vinson, Jackson, Minton
- Concurrence: Black
- Dissent: Douglas, joined by Reed, Burton, Clark

Laws applied
- 18 U.S.C. § 241

United States v. Williams, 341 U.S. 70 (1951), is a decision by the United States Supreme Court that provides that 18 U.S.C. § 241 (protecting US citizens' Fourteenth Amendment rights from individuals sworn to uphold laws) may be applied only to federal cases and is not available to state governments.

== Background ==
Jay G. Williams was employed by a Florida detective agency. In 1947, the agency was hired by a Florida company to investigate thefts occurring on the company's property. Williams was the head of the detective agency. Williams, two other employees of the detective agency, and a member of the Miami police force participated in the investigation. As some of the company's employees became suspects, Williams and his collaborators, without arresting the suspects, took them one by one to an isolated building on the company's premises. There, the investigators subjected them to intense interrogations, which, "after blows, kicks, threats, and prolonged exposure to a brilliant light," yielded a confession.

The conduct of the detective agency fell outside of the scope of activities permitted by Florida law. Thus, Williams and his accomplices were arrested and charged with a federal crime, 18 USC §§ 241, prohibiting willfully, under color of the laws, statutes, ordinances, regulations and customs of the State of Florida subjecting an inhabitant of the State of Florida, to deprivation of the rights, privileges and immunities secured to him and protected by the Fourteenth Amendment.

18 USC §§ 241 originated with the Enforcement Act of 1870, which enforced the "Right of Citizens of the United States to vote in the several States of this Union, and for other Purposes." In furtherance of its chief end of assuring the right of African Americans to vote, it provided that it should be a misdemeanor for any "person or officer" to fail wrongfully in a duty imposed on him by state law to perform or permit performance of acts necessary to registering or voting. In the course of passage through Congress, several sections were added, which had a larger purpose. One of them, derived from the Civil Rights Act of 1866, designed to "secure to all persons the equal protection of the laws."

== Decision ==
In a narrow 5-4 vote, the Supreme Court determined that 18 USC §§ 241 was instituted by the federal courts to prohibit only officers of the federal government from violating constitutional rights. It was determined that the statute did not cover state officers who violate the state rights of citizens. Therefore, it was determined that the federal court did not have jurisdiction to prosecute Williams under 18 USC §§ 241 because he was under commission by the State of Florida, not by the US government.
