= Fetters (surname) =

Fetters is a surname. Notable people with the surname include:

- Kristina Fetters (1980–2014), American convict
- Levi Fetters (1831–1893), American politician from Pennsylvania
- Mike Fetters (born 1964), American baseball player and coach
- Rob Fetters (born 1954), American composer

== See also ==
- Fetter (surname)
