= Brian Vetter =

American lacrosse player

Personal information
- Nationality: American
- Born: Baltimore, Maryland

Sport
- Position: Midfielder
- MLL teams: Chesapeake Bayhawks, Philadelphia Barrage

Career highlights
- 2010 MLL champion

Brian Vetter is a retired male lacrosse player who played midfield for the Chesapeake Bayhawks and the Philadelphia Barrage of Major League Lacrosse. Brian played his college ball for Towson University in Maryland. Brian was a part of the Chesapeake Bayhawks championship team in 2010.
