= 1940 United States Senate election in Virginia =

- November 5, 1940
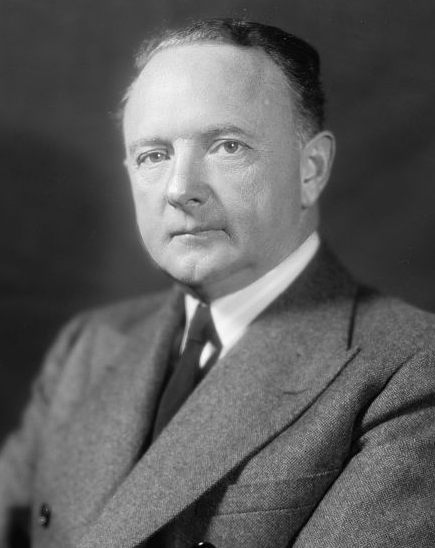
Nominee	Harry F. Byrd Sr.
Party	Democratic
Popular vote	274,260
Percentage	93.32%
- County and independent city results Byrd: 80–90% 90–100%
U.S. senator before election
Harry F. Byrd Sr.
Democratic
Elected U.S. Senator
Harry F. Byrd Sr.
Democratic

The 1940 United States Senate election in Virginia was held on November 5, 1940. Incumbent Senator Harry F. Byrd Sr. was re-elected to a second term (his third overall) after defeating Independent Hilliard Berstein.

== Results ==
United States Senate election in Virginia, 1940
Party	Candidate	Votes	%	±%
Democratic	Harry F. Byrd Sr. (inc.)	274,260	93.32%	+17.36%
Independent	Hilliard Berstein	11,159	3.80%	
Independent	Alice Burke	8,250	2.81%	
Write-ins		212	0.07%	+0.05%
Majority		263,101	89.53%	+34.50%
Turnout		293,881		
Democratic hold				

== See also ==
- 1940 United States Senate elections
- 1940 United States House of Representatives elections in Virginia
