= Louis Shapiro (communist) =

Co-founder of the Communist Party of America (1919)

Louis Shapiro (also known as Louis Bain; died July 1921) was an American political activist who was a founding member of the Communist Party of America, the Executive Secretary of its Central Executive Committee, and a representative of the Jewish Federation.

== Career ==
Shapiro was a member of the Socialist Party of America and active in the formation of its left wing. In 1919, he became a founding member of the Communist Party of America. Sharpiro was an organizer of District No. 2 (New York) and then Secretary of an early Communist Party following the Party's second convention on July 13–18, 1920.

== Death ==
In February 1921, Shapiro went on Party business to the Soviet Union. In mid-July 1921, on the trip home, he died of heart disease in Hamburg, Germany.
