= Vet =

Vet, VET or the Vet may refer to:

- Veterinarian, a professional who treats disease, disorder and injury in animals
  - Veterinary medicine, the branch of medicine that deals with animals
- Veteran, a person with long experience in a particular area, most often in military service during wartime
- Veterans Stadium, informally "The Vet", a former sports stadium in Philadelphia, Pennsylvania
- Veterans Stadium (New Britain, Connecticut)
- Vet River, South Africa
- Finnish Board of Film Classification (Finnish: Valtion elokuvatarkastamo), an institution of the Finnish Ministry of Education
- Venezuelan Standard Time, a UTC-04:00 time zone
- Vocational education and training, prepares trainees for jobs that are based on manual or practical activities
- Sebastian Vettel, a German F1 driver
- Vet, an alternative form of the Hebrew letter Bet

== See also ==
- Vette (disambiguation)
- Vetting, a process of an evaluation
