= History of the Communist Party USA =

Aspect of U.S. political history

The Communist Party USA (CPUSA) is an American political party with a communist platform that was founded in 1919. Its history is deeply rooted in the history of the American labor movement as it played critical roles in struggles to organize American workers into unions, in leadership of labor strikes, as well as prominent involvement in later civil rights and anti-war movements. Many party members were forced to work covertly due to the high level of political repression in the United States against Communists. CPUSA faced many challenges in gaining a foothold in the United States as they endured two eras of the Red Scare and never experienced significant electoral success. Despite struggling to become a major electoral player, CPUSA was the most prominent leftist party in the United States. CPUSA developed close ties with the Soviet Union, which led to them being financially linked.

Membership of the CPUSA peaked in the late 1940s, with over 75,000 members in 1947. But their influence spanned beyond just their membership as some candidates in national elections garnered over 100,000 votes. However, the CPUSA began to decline in membership in the late 1940s and into the 1950s, presumably due to the Red Scare where the US government publicly tried and convicted Communists and CPUSA members on the grounds of the Smith Act. CPUSA faced challenges when the dissolution of the Soviet Union took place, as they lost their main source of funding. The Communist Party USA is still alive today but its membership and activity have shifted to a more online medium. It has stayed active despite various challenges, including a significant fracturing in the 1990s but is less successful (in membership numbers) than it once was.

== History ==
=== Background ===
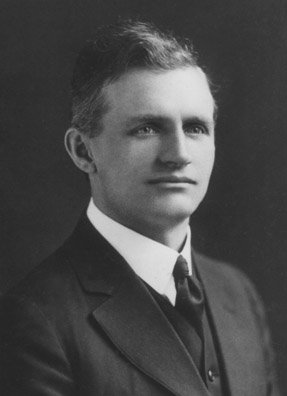
Alfred Wagenknecht (here c. 1918), Executive Secretary of the Communist Labor Party of America, one of the predecessors of the Communist Party

A form of communism was pursued by religious groups in the 17th century. In the settlements of Plymouth and Jamestown, some land was held in common. The Labadists in Maryland (1684–1722), Johann Kelpius' colony of "The Woman in the Wilderness" (1605–1704) in what is now Philadelphia, the Dunker celibates (1713) at Ephrata in Lancaster County, Pennsylvania, and a community at Snowhill, near Harrisburg, Pennsylvania (1820), pursued communism of a sort. As well, Shakers at New Lebanon, New York lived in a communistic way from about 1782 into the 1900s. Harmonites were a later variety of American religious communists. The Oneida Community, or the "Perfectionists," established by John Humphrey Noyes, which lasted from 1848 to 1880, is another example of a communistic religious community.

As well, forms of communism and socialism were adhered to in a variety of secular utopian communities in American history. This includes many that were founded by the Fourierist and Owenist movements. The Kaweah (California) community and Ruskin colony (Tennessee) also ascribed to communist principles.

Chronologically overlapping with these communistic social experiments, the earliest American socialist political groupings and parties got their start in the last half of the 19th century. Stephen Pearl Andrews and Victoria Woodhull were habituées of utopian communities and also participated in the communist movement's 1st International. Edward Bellamy and his book Looking Backward spawned both a wave of communistic Bellamy communities at various points in the U.S. and also a 1890s-era socialist political movement, the Nationalist Clubs, which provided leadership to the People's Party and the Populist Party.

The first socialist political party in the United States was the Socialist Labor Party (SLP). Formed in 1876 it was for many years a viable force in the international socialist movement. By the mid-1890s, the SLP came under the influence of Daniel De Leon and his radical views led to widespread discontent amongst the members, leading to the 1901 founding of the reformist-oriented Socialist Party of America (SPA), which included Eugene Debs and other former members of the People's Party. A left wing emerged within the Socialist Party, to the consternation of many party leaders. The new Left wing of the SPA attempted to win a majority of executive positions within the party's internal elections, after the election results, in which the left wing of the party succeeded in electing many candidates, moderate leadership subsequently invalidated the 1919 elections. This flouting of democracy within the party set the stage for factions to split off to begin forming a new Communist Party.

In January 1919, Vladimir Lenin invited the Left Wing Section of the Socialist Party to join the Communist International (Comintern). During the spring of 1919, the Left Wing Section of the Socialist Party, buoyed by a large influx of new members from countries involved in the Russian Revolution, prepared to wrest control from the smaller controlling faction of moderate socialists. A referendum to join Comintern passed with 90% support, but the incumbent leadership suppressed the results. Elections for the party's National Executive Committee resulted in 12 leftists being elected out of a total of 15. Calls were made to expel moderates from the party. The moderate incumbents struck back by expelling several state organizations, half a dozen language federations, and many locals; in all two-thirds of the membership.

=== 1919–1921: Formation and early history ===
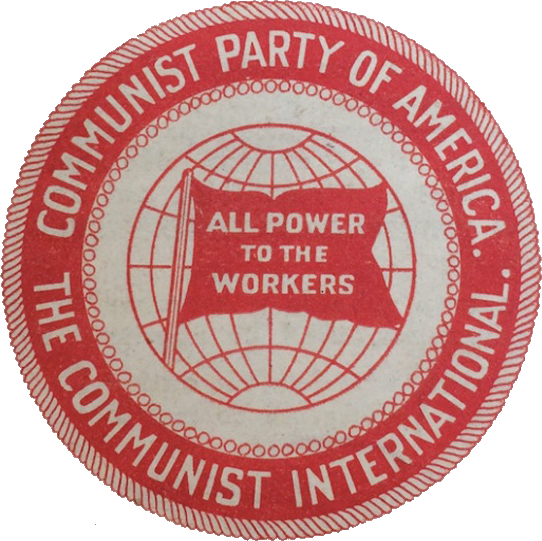
Logo of the Communist Party of America, as shown on its first pamphlet, in 1919

The Socialist Party then called an emergency convention on August 30, 1919. The party's Left Wing Section made plans at a June conference of its own to regain control of the party by sending delegations from the sections of the party that had been expelled to the convention to demand that they be seated. However, the language federations, eventually joined by C. E. Ruthenberg and Louis C. Fraina, turned away from that effort and formed their own party, the Communist Party of America, at a separate convention on September 1, 1919. Meanwhile, plans led by John Reed and Benjamin Gitlow to crash the Socialist Party Convention went ahead. Tipped off, the incumbents called the police, who obligingly expelled the leftists from the hall. The remaining leftist delegates walked out and meeting with the expelled delegates formed the Communist Labor Party on August 30, 1919.

The Comintern was not happy with two communist parties and in January 1920 dispatched an order that the two parties, which consisted of about 12,000 members, merge under the name United Communist Party and to follow the party line established in Moscow. Part of the Communist Party of America under the leadership of Ruthenberg and Jay Lovestone did this, but a faction under the leadership of Nicholas I. Hourwich and Alexander Bittelman continued to operate independently as the Communist Party of America. A more strongly worded directive from the Comintern eventually did the trick and the parties were merged in May 1921. Only five percent of the members of the newly formed party were U.S.-born English-speakers. Many members came from the ranks of the Industrial Workers of the World (IWW).

=== 1919–1923: Red Scare and the Communist Party USA ===
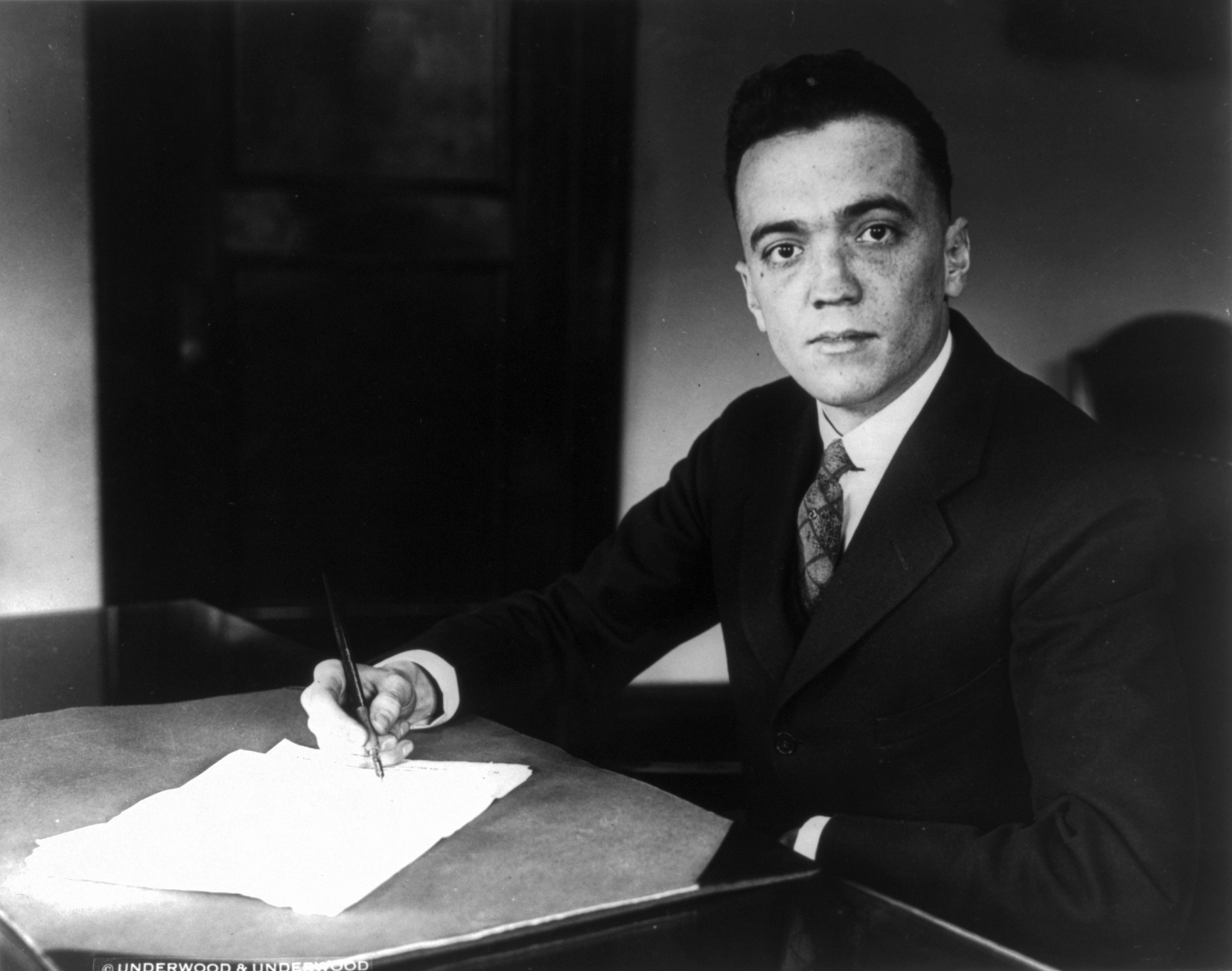
A young J. Edgar Hoover (here c. 1932) rose to power during the First Red Scare (1919–1923)

From its inception, the Communist Party USA (CPUSA) came under attack from state and federal governments and later the U.S. Department of Justice's Bureau of Investigation. In 1919, after a series of unattributed bombings and attempted assassinations of government officials and judges (later traced to militant adherents of the radical anarchist Luigi Galleani), the Department of Justice headed by Attorney General A. Mitchell Palmer, acting under the Sedition Act of 1918, began arresting thousands of foreign-born party members, many of whom the government deported. The Communist Party was forced underground and took to the use of pseudonyms and secret meetings in an effort to evade the authorities.

The party apparatus was to a great extent underground. It re-emerged in the last days of 1921 as a legal political party called the Workers Party of America (WPA). As the Red Scare and deportations of the early 1920s ebbed, the party became bolder and more open. However, an element of the party remained permanently underground and came to be known as the "CPUSA secret apparatus". During this time, immigrants from Eastern Europe are said to have played a very prominent role in the Communist Party. A majority of the members of the Socialist Party were immigrants and an "overwhelming" percentage of the Communist Party consisted of recent immigrants.

=== 1923–1929: Factional war ===
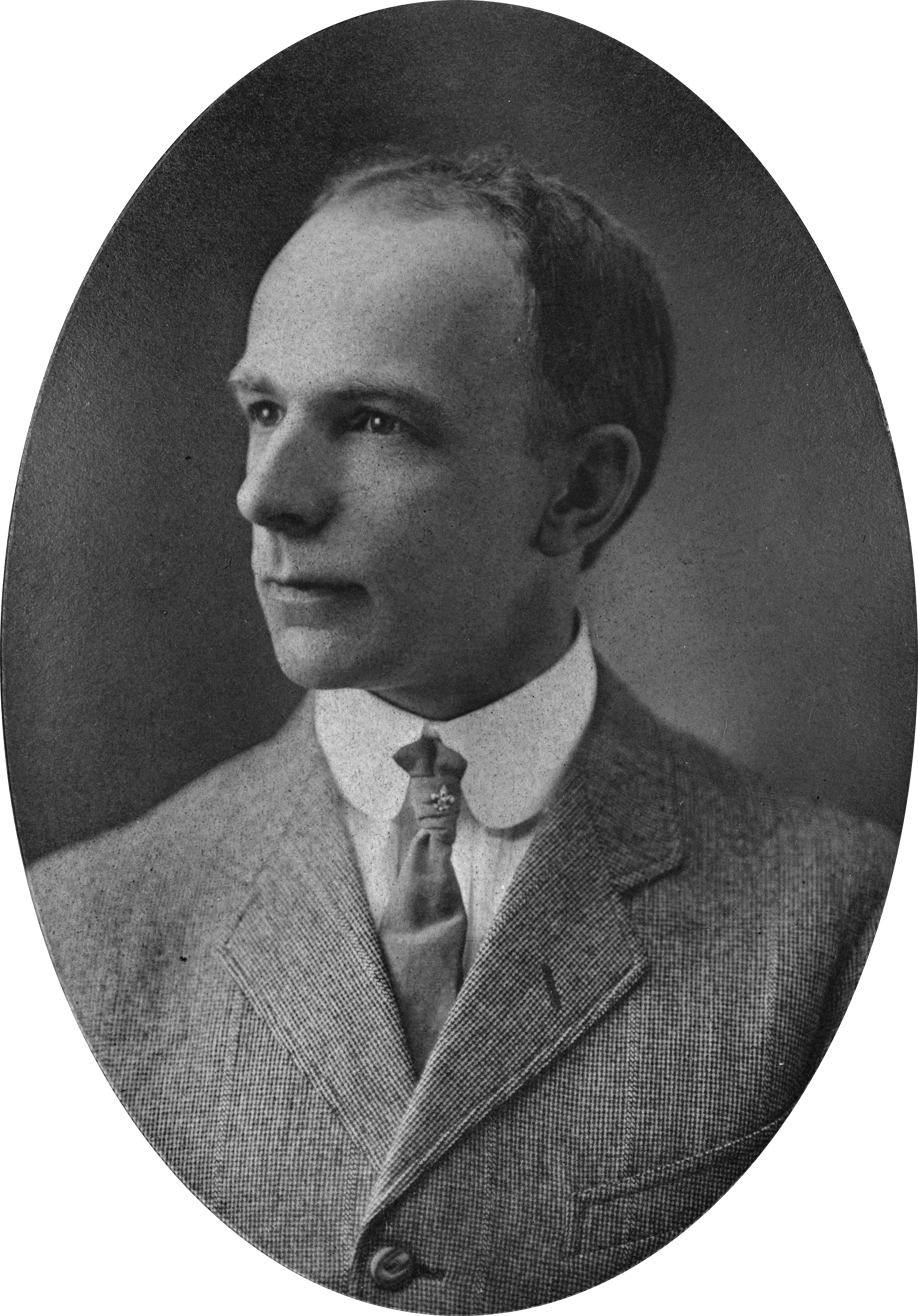
C. E. Ruthenberg (here c. 1910), Executive Secretary of the Communist Party USA

Now that the above ground element was legal, the Communists decided that their central task was to develop roots within the working class. This move away from hopes of revolution in the near future to a more nuanced approach was accelerated by the decisions of the Fifth World Congress of the Comintern held in 1925. The Fifth World Congress decided that the period between 1917 and 1924 had been one of revolutionary upsurge, but that the new period was marked by the stabilization of capitalism and that revolutionary attempts in the near future were to be stopped. The American Communists embarked then on the arduous work of locating and winning allies.

That work was complicated by factional struggles within the Communist Party which quickly developed a number of more or less fixed factional groupings within its leadership: a faction around the party's Executive Secretary C. E. Ruthenberg, which was largely organized by his supporter Jay Lovestone; and the Foster-Cannon faction, headed by William Z. Foster, who headed the party's Trade Union Educational League (TUEL); and James P. Cannon, who led the International Labor Defense (ILD) organization.

Foster, who had been deeply involved in the steel strike of 1919 and had been a long-time syndicalist and a Wobbly, had strong bonds with the progressive leaders of the Chicago Federation of Labor (CFL) and through them with the Progressive Party and nascent farmer-labor parties. Under pressure from the Comintern, the party broke off relations with both groups in 1924. In 1925, the Comintern through its representative Sergei Gusev ordered the majority Foster faction to surrender control to Ruthenberg's faction, which Foster complied. However, the factional infighting within the Communist Party did not end as the Communist leadership of the New York locals of the International Ladies' Garment Workers' Union (ILGWU) lost the 1926 strike of cloakmakers in New York City in large part because of intra-party factional rivalries.

Ruthenberg died in 1927 and his ally Lovestone succeeded him as party secretary. Cannon attended the Sixth Congress of the Comintern in 1928 hoping to use his connections with leading circles within it to regain the advantage against the Lovestone faction, but Cannon and Maurice Spector of the Communist Party of Canada (CPC) were accidentally given a copy of Leon Trotsky's "Critique of the Draft Program of the Comintern" that they were instructed to read and return. Persuaded by its contents, they came to an agreement to return to the United States and campaign for the document's positions. A copy of the document was then smuggled out of the country in a child's toy. Back in the United States, Cannon and his close associates in the ILD such as Max Shachtman and Martin Abern, dubbed the "three generals without an army", began to organize support for Trotsky's theses. However, as this attempt to develop a Left Opposition came to light, they and their supporters were expelled. Cannon and his followers organized the Communist League of America (CLA) as a section of Trotsky's International Left Opposition (ILO).

At the same Congress, Lovestone had impressed the leadership of the Communist Party of the Soviet Union (CPSU) as a strong supporter of Nikolai Bukharin, the general secretary of the Comintern. This was to have unfortunate consequences for Lovestone as in 1929 Bukharin was on the losing end of a struggle with Joseph Stalin and was purged from his position on the Politburo and removed as head of the Comintern. In a reversal of the events of 1925, a Comintern delegation sent to the United States demanded that Lovestone resign as party secretary in favor of his archrival Foster despite the fact that Lovestone enjoyed the support of the vast majority of the American party's membership. Lovestone traveled to the Soviet Union and appealed directly to the Comintern. Stalin informed Lovestone that he "had a majority because the American Communist Party until now regarded you as the determined supporter of the Communist International. And it was only because the Party regarded you as friends of the Comintern that you had a majority in the ranks of the American Communist Party".

When Lovestone returned to the United States, he and his ally Benjamin Gitlow were purged despite holding the leadership of the party. Ostensibly, this was not due to Lovestone's insubordination in challenging a decision by Stalin, but for his support for American exceptionalism, the thesis that socialism could be achieved peacefully in the United States. Lovestone and Gitlow formed their own group called the Communist Party (Opposition), a section of the pro-Bukharin International Communist Opposition (CO), which was initially larger than the Trotskyists, but it failed to survive past 1941. Lovestone had initially called his faction the Communist Party (Majority Group) in the expectation that the majority of party members would join him, but only a few hundred people joined his new organization.

=== 1928–1935: Third Period ===
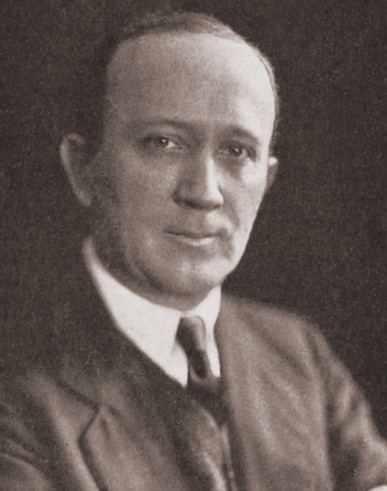
William Z. Foster (undated) emerged as CPUSA head in 1929 after Lovestone and Foster visited Stalin in Moscow

The upheavals within the Communist Party in 1928 were an echo of a much more significant change relating to Stalin's decision to forbear any form of Comintern collaboration with Western socialist parties, which were now condemned as "social fascists." The impact of this non-alignment policy in the United States was counted in membership figures. In 1928, there were about 24,000 members. By 1932, the total had fallen to 6,000 members. Despite the changes in the USSR, the Communist International (Comintern) still played a large role in selecting CPUSA officials. Additionally, CPUSA and the Comintern still exchanged delegates during the 1930s, and CPUSA still accepted funding from Moscow.

Opposing Stalin's Third Period policies in the Communist Party was James P. Cannon. For this action, he was expelled from the party. Cannon then founded the CLA with Max Shachtman and Martin Abern and started publishing The Militant. It declared itself to be an external faction of the Communist Party until—as the Trotskyists saw it—Stalin's policies in Germany helped Adolf Hitler take power. At that point, they started working towards the founding of a new international, the Fourth International (FI).

In the United States, the principal impact of the Third Period was to end the Communist Party's efforts to organize within the American Federation of Labor (AFL) through the TUEL and to turn its efforts into organizing dual unions through the Trade Union Unity League. Foster went along with this change, even though it contradicted the policies he had fought for previously. In 1928, Communist Party USA nominated William Z. Foster for the presidential election, he accepted with the aim of further growing class consciousness, and they garnered over 48,000 votes (despite only having 9,000 members). Many of the party leaders, including Foster himself, knew that they were never going to win office. However, they did stir some class consciousness but also butted heads with some unions during their campaigning, including the AFL. The party was ballot qualified in New York from 1932 to 1936.

By 1930, the party adopted the slogan of "the united front from below." The Communist Party devoted much of its energy in the Great Depression to organizing the unemployed, attempting to found "red" unions, championing the rights of African Americans, and fighting evictions of farmers and the working poor. At the same time, the party attempted to weave its sectarian revolutionary politics into its day-to-day defense of workers, usually with only limited success. They recruited more disaffected members of the Socialist Party and an organization of African American socialists called the African Blood Brotherhood (ABB), some of whose members, particularly Harry Haywood, would later play important roles in Communist work among blacks.

In 1928, the Communist Party USA changed its constitution and called for the right of self-determination of African Americans in the southern United States. Communist Party USA would go on to help build the Alabama Sharecroppers Union and class consciousness in the "Black Belt' of the American South in the 1930s. Self-determination was never a realistic goal in the context of the American South, and one prominent black communist even admitted as such in 1935. In 1931, the party began to organize the Alabama Sharecroppers Union in Tallapoosa County, Alabama. However, early efforts in Camp Hill, Alabama were plagued with poor organization and brushes with local authorities resulting in arrests and tension. The party saw the creation of the sharecroppers union as key in the fight for self-determination and eventually reorganized in an effort to keep the movement alive. The area was divided into smaller locals and built outwards into four different counties. The union was organized around seven basic demands that were largely economic and centered around the economic rights of sharecroppers. In 1935, when the Alabama Sharecroppers Union had 12,000 members, they called a strike in 7 counties across Alabama, demanding an increase in wages from roughly 35 cents to a dollar. The strike succeeded outright on 35 plantations, and wages were raised to 75 cents on other plantations. CPUSA's campaign in Alabama helped lay the groundwork for the civil rights movement. When CPUSA called for the right of self-determination and recognized distinctions in the African American struggle, they created a new political ally in the working class and had the means to become an interracial party that could stand clearly against segregation and racial injustice. CPUSA's actions in the South represented a change in their actions and goals that would become solidified in their 1938 constitution as they moved towards more local goals.

In 1932, the retiring head of the party, William Z. Foster, published a book entitled Toward Soviet America, which laid out the Communist Party's plans for revolution and the building of a new socialist society based on the model of Soviet Russia. In that same year, Earl Browder became General Secretary of the Communist Party. At first, Browder moved the party closer to Soviet interests and helped to develop its secret apparatus or underground network. He also assisted in the recruitment of espionage sources and agents for the Soviet NKVD. Browder's own younger sister Margerite was an NKVD operative in Europe until removed from those duties at Browder's request. It was at this point that the party's foreign policy platform came under the complete control of Stalin, who enforced his directives through his secret police and foreign intelligence service, the NKVD. The NKVD controlled the secret apparatus of the Communist Party.

During the Great Depression in the United States, many Americans became disillusioned with capitalism and some found communist ideology appealing. Others were attracted by the visible activism of American Communists on behalf of a wide range of social and economic causes, including the rights of African Americans, workers, and the unemployed. Still others, alarmed by the rise of the Franquists in Spain and the Nazis in Germany, admired the Soviet Union's early and staunch opposition to fascism. The membership of the Communist Party swelled from 6,822 at the beginning of the decade to 66,000 by the end. It held mass rallies that filled Madison Square Garden.

=== 1935–1939: Popular Front ===
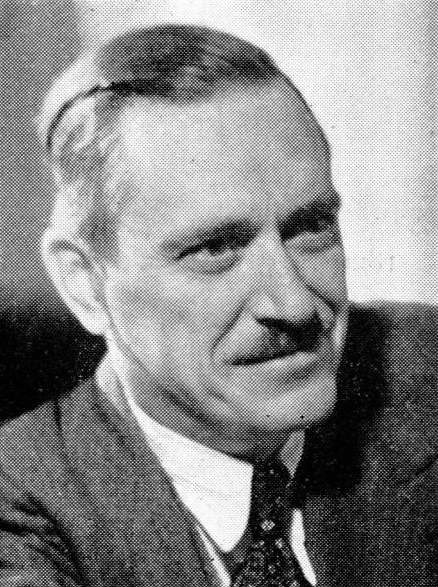
Earl Browder (here c. 1938) led the CPUSA from 1932 to his ouster in 1946

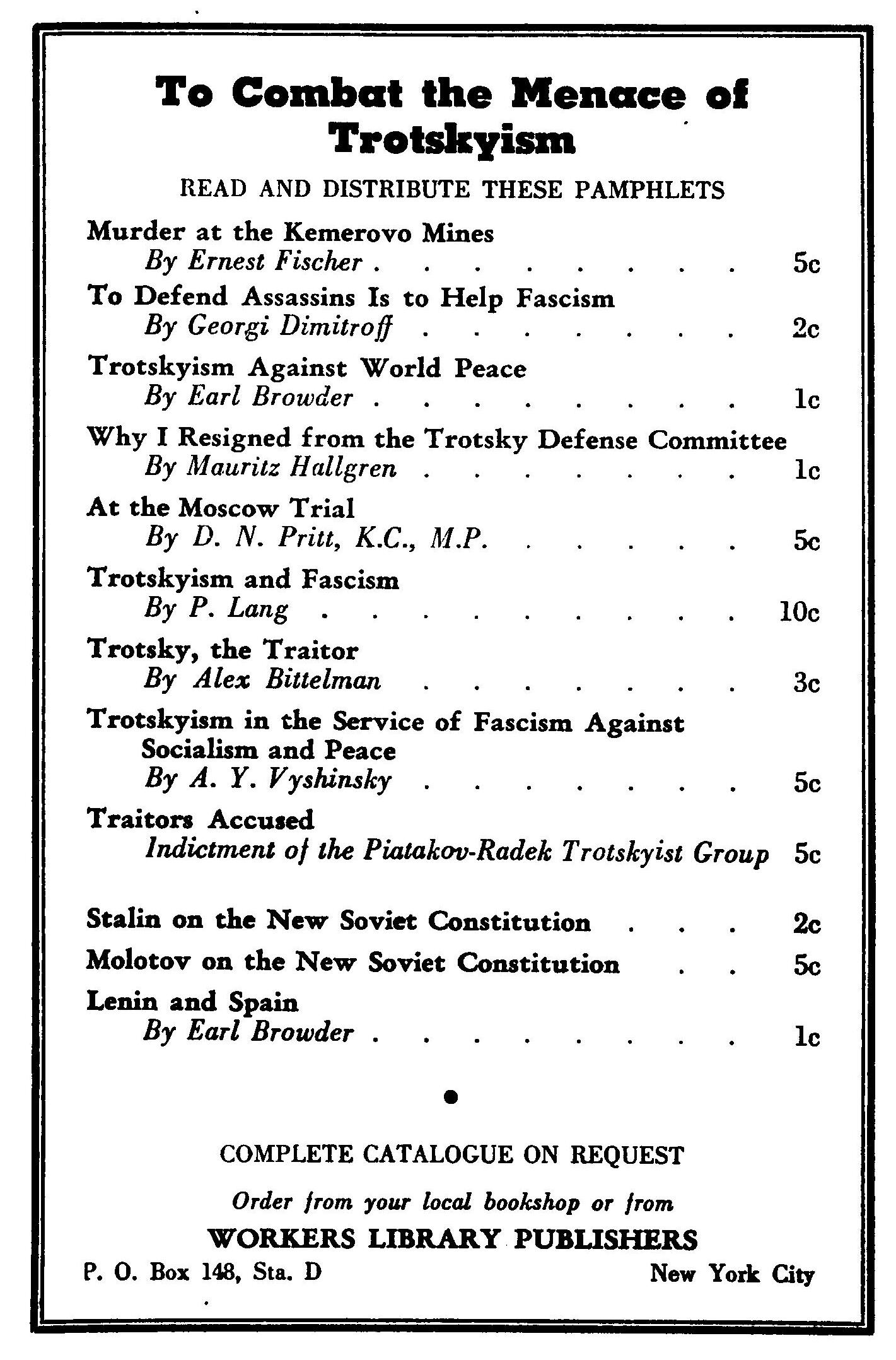
An advertisement of anti-Trotskyist pamphlets published by the Communist Party, 1937

The ideological rigidity of the third period began to crack with two events: the election of Franklin D. Roosevelt as President of the United States in 1932 and Adolf Hitler's rise to power in Germany in 1933. Roosevelt's election and the passage of the National Industrial Recovery Act in 1933 sparked a tremendous upsurge in union organizing in 1933 and 1934. While the party line still favored creation of autonomous revolutionary unions, party activists chose to fold up those organizations and follow the mass of workers into the AFL unions they had been attacking.

The Seventh Congress of the Comintern made the change in line official in 1935, when it declared the need for a popular front of all groups opposed to fascism. The Communist Party abandoned its opposition to the New Deal, provided many of the organizers for the Congress of Industrial Organizations (CIO) and began supporting African American civil rights. The party also sought unity with forces to its right. Earl Browder offered to run as Norman Thomas' running mate on a joint Socialist Party-Communist Party ticket in the 1936 presidential election, but Thomas rejected this overture. The gesture did not mean that much in practical terms since by 1936 the Communist Party effectively supporting Roosevelt in much of his trade union work. While continuing to run its own candidates for office, the party pursued a policy of representing the Democratic Party as the lesser evil in elections.

Party members also rallied to the defense of the Spanish Republic during this period after a Nationalist military uprising moved to overthrow it, resulting in the Spanish Civil War (1936–1939). The Communist Party along with leftists throughout the world raised funds for medical relief while many of its members made their way to Spain with the aid of the party to join the Lincoln Brigade, one of the International Brigades. Among its other achievements, the Lincoln Brigade was the first American military force to include blacks and whites integrated on an equal basis. Intellectually, the Popular Front period saw the development of a strong Communist influence in intellectual and artistic life. This was often through various organizations influenced or controlled by the party, or as they were pejoratively known, "fronts".

The party under Browder supported Stalin's show trials in the Soviet Union, called the Moscow Trials. Therein, between August 1936 and mid-1938 the Soviet government indicted, tried and shot virtually all of the remaining Old Bolsheviks. Beyond the show trials lay a broader purge, the Great Purge, that killed millions. Browder uncritically supported Stalin, likening Trotskyism to "cholera germs" and calling the Great Purge "a signal service to the cause of progressive humanity". He compared the show trial defendants to domestic traitors Benedict Arnold, Aaron Burr, disloyal War of 1812 Federalists and Confederate secessionists while likening persons who "smeared" Stalin's name to those who had slandered Abraham Lincoln and Franklin D. Roosevelt.

=== 1939–1947: World War II and aftermath ===
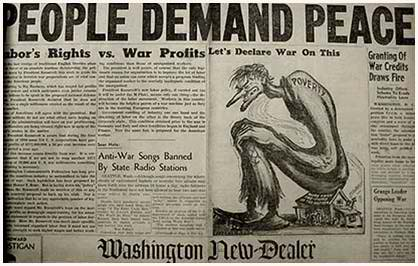
The Washington Commonwealth Federation newspaper after the signing of the Molotov-Ribbentrop pact (original scan)

The Communist Party was adamantly opposed to fascism during the Popular Front period. Although membership in the party rose to about 66,000 by 1939, nearly 20,000 members left the party by 1943, after the Soviet Union signed the Molotov–Ribbentrop Pact with Nazi Germany on August 23, 1939. While general secretary Browder at first attacked Germany for its September 1, 1939 invasion of western Poland, on September 11 the Communist Party received a blunt directive from Moscow denouncing the Polish government. Between September 14–16, party leaders bickered about the direction to take.

On September 17, the Soviet Union invaded eastern Poland and occupied the Polish territory assigned to it by the Molotov–Ribbentrop Pact, followed by co-ordination with German forces in Poland.

The British, French and German Communist parties, all originally war supporters, abandoned their anti-fascist crusades, demanded peace and denounced Allied governments. The Communist Party turned the focus of its public activities from anti-fascism to advocating peace, not only opposing military preparations, but also condemning those opposed to Hitler. The party attacked British Prime Minister Neville Chamberlain and French leader Édouard Daladier, but it did not at first attack President Roosevelt, reasoning that this could devastate American Communism, blaming instead Roosevelt's advisors.

In October and November, after the Soviets invaded Finland and forced mutual assistance pacts from Estonia, Latvia and Lithuania, the Communist Party considered Russian security sufficient justification to support the actions. Secret short wave radio broadcasts in October from Comintern leader Georgi Dimitrov ordered Browder to change the party's support for Roosevelt. On October 23, the party began attacking Roosevelt. The party was active in the isolationist America First Committee.

The Communist Party dropped its boycott of Nazi goods, spread the slogans "The Yanks Are Not Coming" and "Hands Off", set up a "perpetual peace vigil" across the street from the White House and announced that Roosevelt was the head of the "war party of the American bourgeoisie". By April 1940, the party Daily Worker's line seemed not so much antiwar as simply pro-German. A pamphlet stated the Jews had just as much to fear from Britain and France as they did Germany. In August 1940, after NKVD agent Ramón Mercader killed Trotsky with an ice axe, Browder perpetuated Moscow's fiction that the killer, who had been dating one of Trotsky's secretaries, was a disillusioned follower. In allegiance to the Soviet Union, the party changed this policy again after Hitler broke the Molotov–Ribbentrop Pact by attacking the Soviet Union on June 22, 1941.

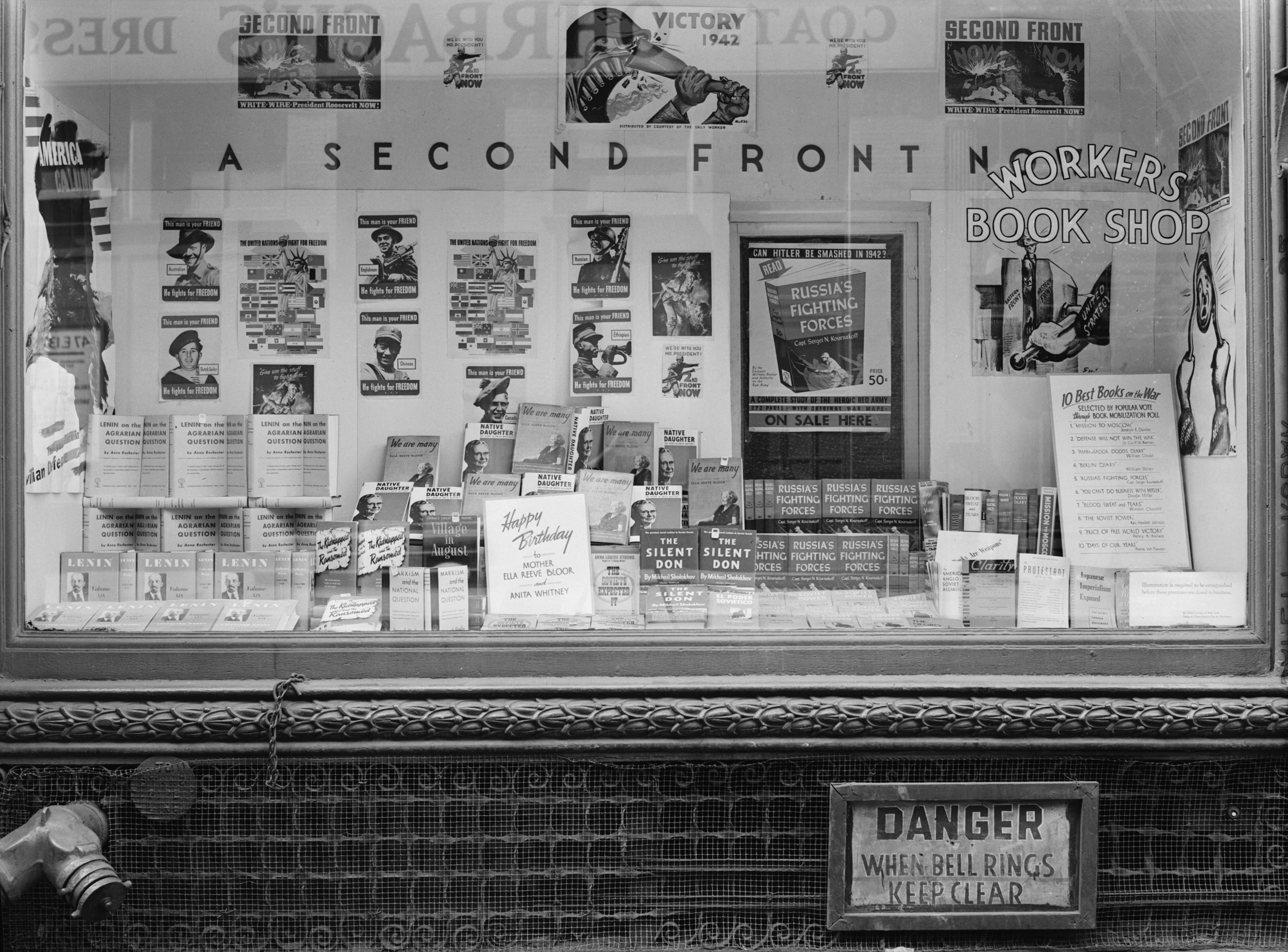
Communist Party USA bookstore in September 1942 with the pro-war slogan "A Second Front Now"

Throughout the rest of World War II, the Communist Party continued a policy of militant, if sometimes bureaucratic, trade unionism while opposing strike actions at all costs. The leadership of the Communist Party was among the most vocal pro-war voices in the United States, advocating unity against fascism, supporting the prosecution of leaders of the Socialist Workers Party (SWP) under the newly enacted Smith Act and opposing A. Philip Randolph's efforts to organize a march on Washington to dramatize black workers' demands for equal treatment on the job. Prominent party members and supporters, such as Dalton Trumbo and Pete Seeger, recalled anti-war material they had previously released. In turn, the U.S. government began to lift prewar restrictions on the CPUSA in order to maintain good United States-Soviet Union relations during the war.

Earl Browder expected the wartime coalition between the Soviet Union and the West to bring about a prolonged period of social harmony after the war. In order better to integrate the Communist movement into American life, the party was officially dissolved in 1944 and replaced by a Communist Political Association. This coincided with the Italian Communist Party's (CPI) Salerno turn accommodation with other anti-fascist parties in 1944. However, that harmony proved elusive and the international Communist movement swung to the left after the war ended. Browder found himself isolated when the Duclos letter from the leader of the French Communist Party (FCP), attacking Browderism (an accommodation with American political conditions), received wide circulation amongst Communist officials internationally. As a result of this, he was retired and replaced in 1945 by William Z. Foster, who would remain the senior leader of the party until his own retirement in 1958.

In line with other Communist parties worldwide, the Communist Party also swung to the left and as a result experienced a brief period in which a number of internal critics argued for a more leftist stance than the leadership was willing to countenance. The result was the expulsion of a handful of "premature anti-revisionists". The National Republican had at a time estimated that there were over a million communists in America.

=== 1947–1958: Second Red Scare ===
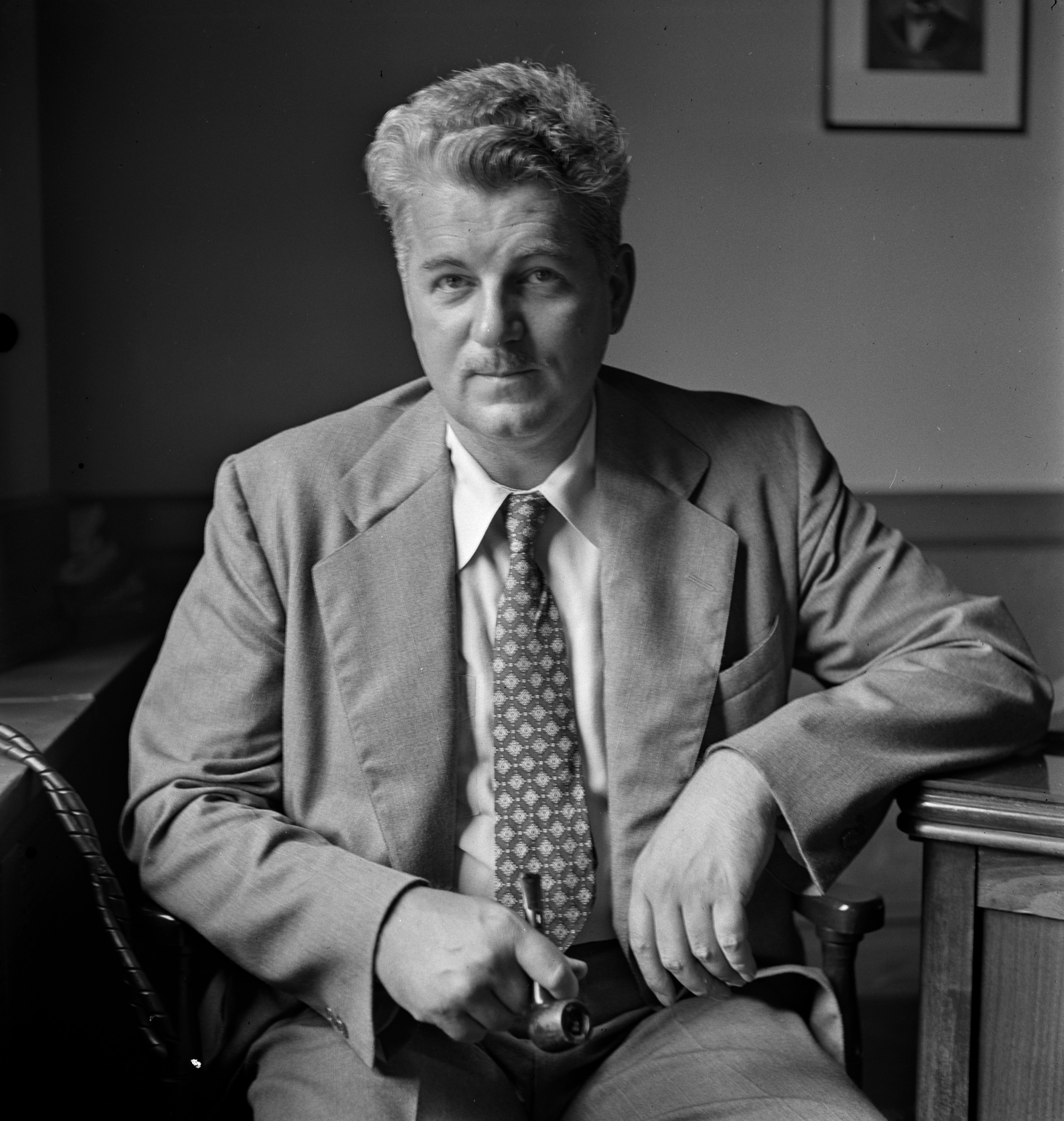
Eugene Dennis (here c. 1954) led the CPUSA with William Z. Foster after Browder's ouster in 1946

More important for the party was the renewal of state persecution of the Communist Party with the beginning of the Cold War in the late 1940s. The Truman administration's loyalty oath program, introduced in 1947, drove some leftists out of federal employment and more importantly legitimized the notion of Communists as subversives to be exposed and expelled from public and private employment. The House Un-American Activities Committee (HUAC), created in 1938 amid concerns over the spread of communism and political subversion within the United States, had a focus on investigating and in some cases trying citizens in court, who had communist ties, including citizens tied to CPUSA. These actions inspired local governments to adopt loyalty oaths and investigative commissions of their own. Private parties, such as the motion picture industry and self-appointed watchdog groups, extended the policy still further. This included the still controversial blacklist of actors, writers and directors in Hollywood who had been Communists or who had fallen in with Communist-controlled or influenced organizations in the pre-war and wartime years. The union movement purged party members as well. The CIO formally expelled a number of left-led unions in 1949 after internal disputes triggered by the party's support for Henry Wallace's 1948 Progressive Party candidacy for president and its opposition to the Marshall Plan while other labor leaders sympathetic to the Communist Party either were driven out of their unions or dropped their alliances with the party.

In 1949's Foley Square trial, the Federal Bureau of Investigation (FBI) prosecuted eleven members of the Communist Party's leadership, including Gus Hall and Eugene Dennis. The prosecution argued that the party endorsed a violent overthrow of the government, which was illegal due the 1940 passage of the Smith Act; but the defendants countered that they advocated for a peaceful transition to socialism and that the First Amendment's guarantee of free speech and association protected their membership in a political party. The trial—held in Manhattan's Foley Square courthouse—was widely publicized by the media and was featured on the cover of Time magazine twice. Large numbers of protesters supporting the Communist defendants protested outside the courthouse daily. The defense attorneys used a "labor defense" strategy which attacked the trial as a capitalist venture that would not provide a fair outcome to proletarian defendants. During the trial, the defense routinely antagonized the judge and prosecution and five of the defendants were sent to jail for contempt of court for disrupting the trial. Public opinion was overwhelmingly against the defendants and after a ten-month trial the jury found all 11 defendants guilty and they were sentenced to terms of five years in federal prison. When the trial concluded, the judge sent all five defense attorneys to jail for contempt of court. Two of the attorneys were subsequently disbarred. The US Supreme Court upheld the ruling in 1951. The government prosecutors, encouraged by their success, arrested and convicted over 100 additional party officers in the early 1950s.

The widespread fear of Communism became even more acute after the Soviets' detonation of an atomic bomb in 1949 and discovery of Soviet atomic espionage. Ambitious politicians, including Richard Nixon and Joseph McCarthy, made names for themselves by exposing or threatening to expose Communists within the Truman administration or later—in McCarthy's case—within the United States Army. Liberal groups, such as the Americans for Democratic Action, not only distanced themselves from Communists and Communist causes, but defined themselves as anti-communist. Congress outlawed the Communist Party in the Communist Control Act of 1954. However, the act was largely ineffectual thanks in part to its ambiguous language. In the 1961 case, Communist Party v. Catherwood, the Supreme Court ruled that the act did not bar the party from participating in New York's unemployment insurance system. No administration has tried to enforce it since. In addition to the Catherwood ruling, the Yates ruling of 1957 helped bring an end to the prosecution of communist citizens under the Smith Act.

By the mid-1950s, membership of Communist Party had slipped from its 1947 peak of around 75,000 to an active base of approximately 5,000. Some 1,500 of these "members" were FBI informants. To the extent that the Communist Party did survive, it was crippled by the penetration activities of these informants, who kept close surveillance on the few remaining legitimate members of the party on behalf of FBI Director J. Edgar Hoover and the party dried up as a base for Soviet espionage. "If it were not for me", Hoover told a State Department official in 1963, "there would not be a Communist Party of the United States. Because I've financed the Communist Party, in order to know what they are doing". William Sullivan, chief of intelligence operations for the FBI in the 1950s, has also described Hoover's continued zeal in pursuing action against the party as "insincere" as he was fully aware of the party's moribund condition. Senator McCarthy had also kept up his attacks on the party during the 1950s despite also being aware of its impotency.

Against the backdrop of these many setbacks, William Z. Foster, who was once again in a leadership role after the ouster of Earl Browder and who due to his poor health had not been brought to trial in 1948 along with a number of other members of the party's leadership, wrote his History of the Communist Party of the United States. "The Party history is the record of the American class struggle, of which it is a vital part. It is the story, in general, of the growth of the working class; the abolition of slavery and emancipation of the Negro People; the building of the trade union and farmer movements; the numberless strikes and political struggles of the toiling masses; and the growing political alliance of workers, Negroes, farmers, and intellectuals", says Foster in the first chapter, illuminating a very different perspective of the party from within.

=== 1956–1989: The near death of the Party ===
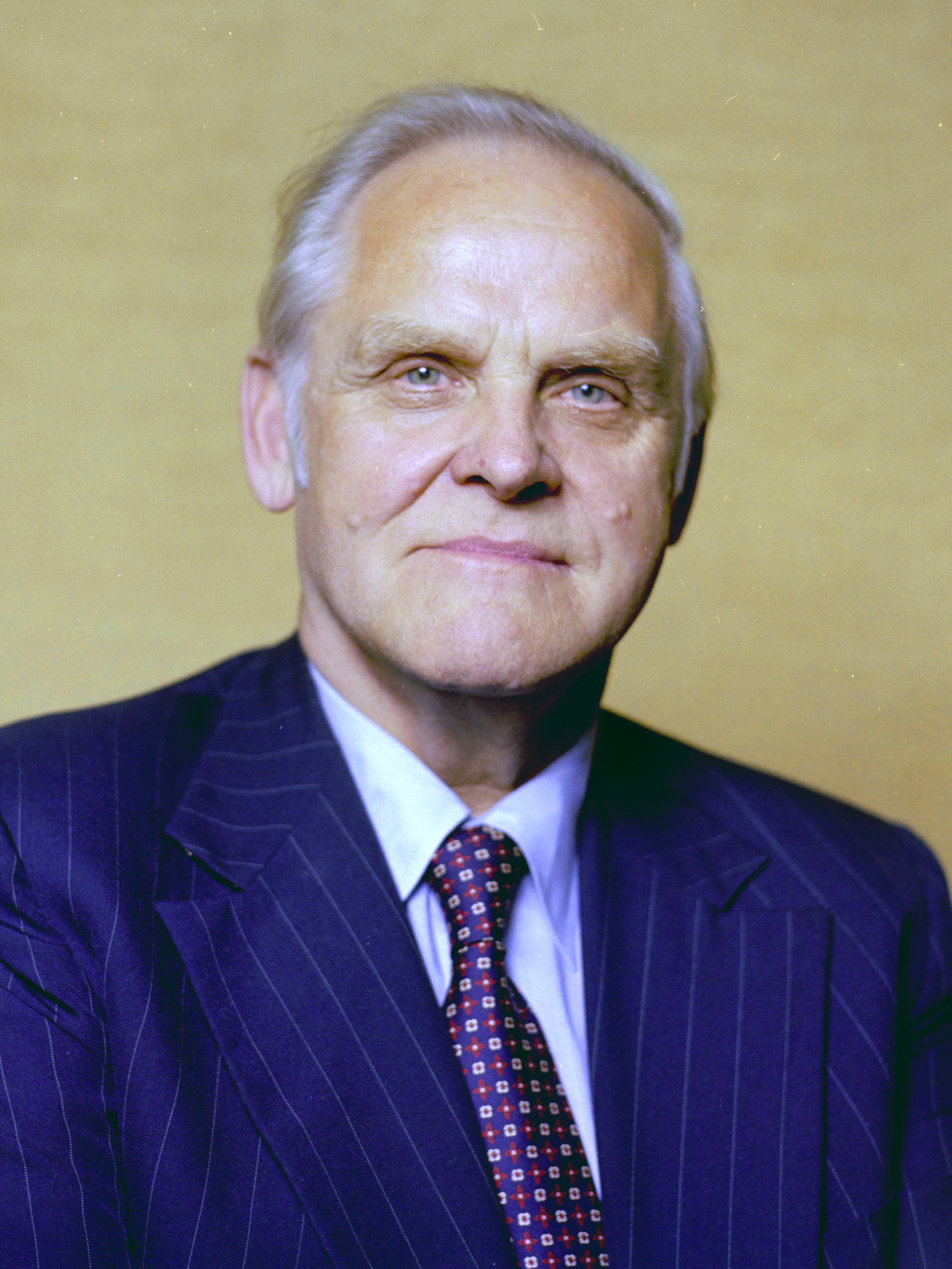
Gus Hall (here in 1980) led the CPUSA for several decades before the collapse of the Soviet Union

The 1956 Soviet invasion of Hungary and the Secret Speech of Nikita Khrushchev to the CPSU listing a devastatingly long and detailed list of atrocities committed by and in the name of Joseph Stalin had a cataclysmic effect on the previously Stalinist majority membership Communist Party. Membership plummeted and the leadership briefly faced a challenge from a loose grouping led by Daily Worker editor John Gates, which wished to democratize the party. Perhaps the greatest single blow dealt to the party in this period was the loss of the Daily Worker, published since 1924, which was suspended in 1958 due to falling circulation.

Most of the critics would depart from the party demoralized, but others would remain active in progressive causes and would often end up working harmoniously with party members. This diaspora rapidly came to provide the audience for publications like the National Guardian and Monthly Review, which were to be important in the development of the New Left in the 1960s.

The post-1956 upheavals in the Communist Party also saw the advent of a new leadership around former steel worker Gus Hall. Hall's views were very much those of his mentor Foster, but he was to be more rigorous in ensuring the party was completely orthodox than Foster in his last years. Therefore, while remaining critics who wished to liberalize the party were expelled, so too were anti-revisionist critics who took an anti-Khrushchev stance. There were various disagreements in the party during Gus Hall's tenure as General Secretary. The California sections of CPUSA were regarded as largely autonomous groups within the broader party. Anyone who didn't adhere to Gus Hall's party discipline ran the risk of being accused as anti-Soviet, an agent of the Democratic Party, and largely disregarded.

But through the hard work of many of the core leadership, the Party rebuilt itself through the nationwide creation of W.E.B. Du Bois Clubs, and the founding of the Young Worker's Liberation League.

The popular work of high-profile leaders like Angela Davis and Bettina Aptheker regained a national prominence for the Party in the anti-capitalist, anti-racist, and anti-imperialist struggle. By the 1970s, the party had grown in membership to about 25,000 members, with many being in prominent positions of leadership in the Civil Rights, anti-war, and Trade Union movements.

During the Sino-Soviet split, CPUSA sided with the Communist Party of the Soviet Union.

=== 1989–2000: CPUSA in a Post-Soviet World ===
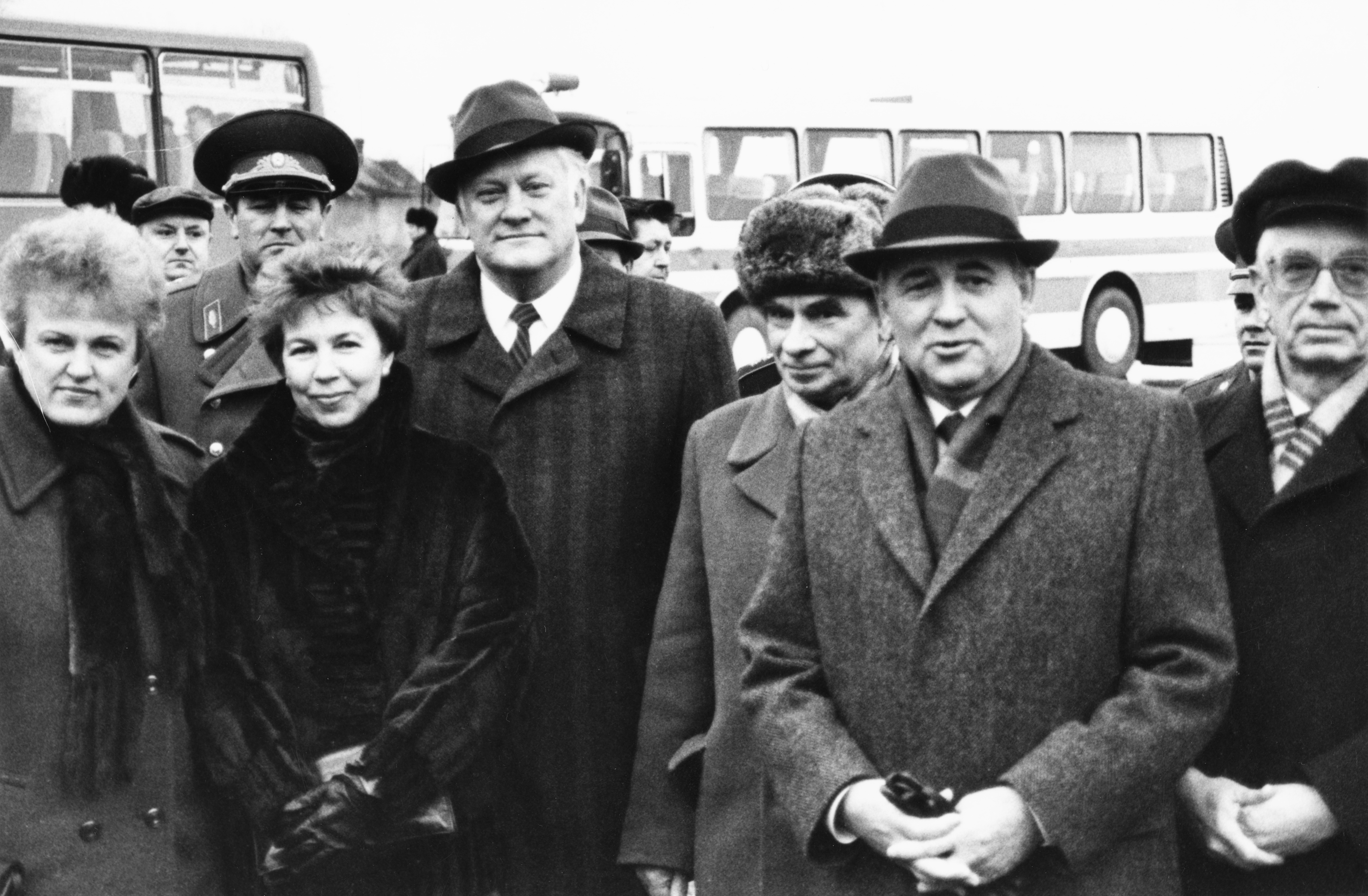
CPSU leader Mikhail Gorbachev could not maintain the USSR, which the CPUSA had supported since its founding (here, Gorbachev, second from right, in Lithuania to try to stop its independence in 1990)

The rise of Mikhail Gorbachev as the leader of the CPSU brought unprecedented changes in American–Soviet relations. Initially, American Communists welcomed Gorbachev's glasnost and perestroika initiatives to restructure and revitalize Soviet socialism. However, as reforms were carried out, neoliberal leaders Ronald Reagan and Margaret Thatcher began to praise Gorbachev, which prompted Communists to double take on their assessment. As the liberalization of the Soviet system began to introduce more aspects of Western society into the Soviet Union, party leader Gus Hall came out in condemnation of these reforms in 1989, describing them as a counter-revolution to restore capitalism. This effectively liquidated relations between the two Communist parties which would be dissolved less than two years later.

The cutoff of funds resulted in a financial crisis, which forced the Communist Party to cut back publication in 1990 of the party newspaper, the People's Daily World, to weekly publication, the People's Weekly World. Following the dissolution of the Soviet Union, a crisis in doctrine ensued. The Communist Party's vision of the future development of socialism had to be completely changed due to the extreme change in the balance of global forces. The more moderate reformists, including Angela Davis, left the party altogether, forming a new organization called the Committees of Correspondence for Democracy and Socialism (CCDS). In an interview, Charlene Mitchell, one of the members who left the party with Angela Davis, explained how she and others felt the party remained closed and failed to open up discussions among members. Many saw the party as slow and impartial to adjustment, one key area being their approach to a labor force that was becoming less and less industrial in the United States. After the attempt on Gorbachev's life and Gus Hall's ensuing comments in which he sided with the coup, many, even those close to him began to question his judgement.

The remaining Communists struggled with questions of identity in the post-Soviet world, some of which that are still part of Communist Party politics today. The party was left reeling after the split and was plagued by many of the same issues yet maintained Gus Hall as General Secretary.

=== 2000–present day: change in alignment ===
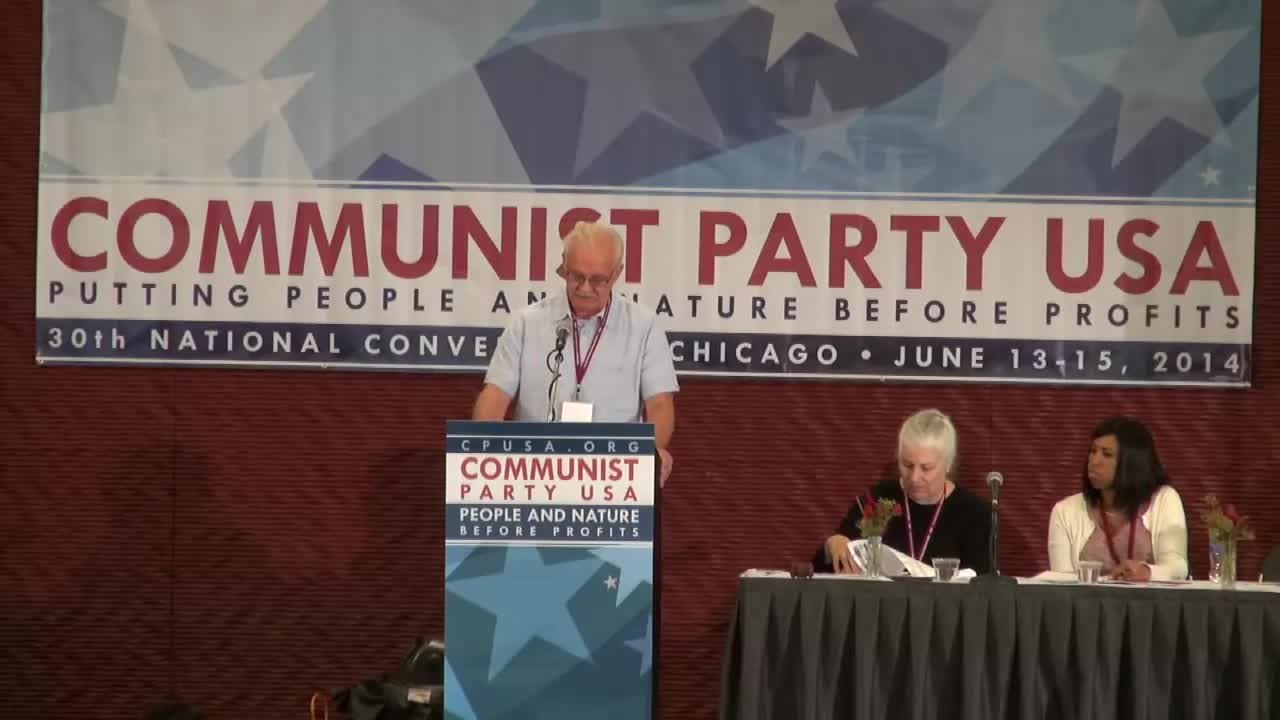
30th National Convention of the Communist Party USA in Chicago

In 2000, after the death of Gus Hall, Sam Webb became the chairman of the National Committee. Under his leadership, the party's top priority became supporting the Democratic Party in elections in order to defeat the "ultra right". Despite the party's previous rigidity which partially caused the previous split, in the 21st Century CPUSA was willing to align with the Democratic Party to an extent far greater than its previous internal critics had even called for. In fact CPUSA had shifted its views to the point where they saw the 2008 election of Barack Obama as a "transformative triumph of a labor-led all peoples’ movement.", a far cry from their previous stances.

Webb issued a thesis on how he saw the party's position in American politics and its role, rejecting Marxism–Leninism as "too rigid and formulaic" and putting forward the idea of "moving beyond Communist Parties" which was widely criticized both within the party and internationally as anti-communist and a move towards liquidation. Webb stepped down as chairman and was replaced by John Bachtell at the party's National Convention in 2014. Two years later, Webb renounced his party membership.

In order to make room for the rental of four floors in the national building, the Communist Party had to move its extensive archives. The archives of the Communist Party were donated in March 2007 to the Tamiment Library at the New York University. The massive donation, in 12,000 cartons, included history from the founding of the party, 20,000 books and pamphlets and a million photographs from the archives of the Daily Worker. The Tamiment Library also holds a copy of the microfilmed archive of Communist Party documents from Soviet Archives held by the Library of Congress and from other materials which documents radical and left history.

Although the CPUSA no longer runs candidates under its own banner, it does run occasional candidates as independents or as Democrats. In 2009 Rick Nagin came close to winning a city council seat in Cleveland. Nagin won 24% of the votes and second place in the primary and therefore advanced to the general election. He lost the general election, although he gained 45% of the votes. In 2019 Wahsayah Whitebird, a member of the CPUSA, won a seat on the city council of Ashland, WI. In April 2021 CPUSA staff released an article/statement declaring it was time to begin running candidates once again. CPUSA has begun exploring running explicitly communist candidates under the party name in local elections in the very near future. Estimating current membership in the CPUSA can be difficult. While various sources claim 5,000 active members, the Trump era has led to a large spike in membership and a reconstituting of the Young Communist League. Estimates now run as high as 8,000 for combined membership in the CPUSA and the newly reformed youth league.

During the 2020 presidential election CPUSA self-published articles written by the party staff in tacit support of then candidate Joe Biden and in vehement opposition to President Donald Trump, CPUSA accused Trump of spreading "deadly hate" during the election. CPUSA has published unofficial (articles on the CPUSA website but not written by party staff) articles likening the 2020 election movement to elect Joe Biden to another Popular Front. In the wake of the January 6 Capitol Riot the party released an article calling for the impeachment of Donald Trump from office. An increasingly militant and growing youth sector played instrumental roles in the Black Lives Matter demonstrations and in the national fight to save Public Housing.

In July 2024, dissenting members of the CPUSA formed their own party, the American Communist Party, citing the CPUSA's support for the Democratic Party and alleged abandonment of Marxism–Leninism, with online political commentators Haz Al-Din as its founding chairman and Jackson Hinkle as a founding Plenary Committee member. The party, Haz Al-Din, and Jackson Hinkle have drawn criticism for populist tactics such as MAGA Communism.

During the 2024 presidential election, an article published by the CPUSA accused presidential candidates Cornel West, Jill Stein, and Claudia de la Cruz of splitting the vote from Kamala Harris, asserting she is the "only viable anti-MAGA candidate", claiming the other candidates have no chance of winning. Co-chair of the CPUSA, Joe Sims, on the party's podcast, Good Morning Revolution, agreed with the assessment that Kamala Harris is the 'lesser evil' candidate compared to Donald Trump and endorsed strategically voting for the Democratic Party in the atmosphere of alleged fascism from the Republican Party.

== See also ==
- Communist Party USA and African Americans
- Rummagers League
