= Rossana Cambron =

American communist activist and co-chair of the Communist Party USA

Co-chair of the Communist Party USA
- Incumbent
- Assumed office June 23, 2019 Serving with Joe Sims
- Preceded by: John Bachtell (as chair)

Personal details
- Born: El Paso, Texas, U.S.
- Party: Communist Party USA
- Spouse: Arturo
- Education: Loyola Marymount University
- Occupation: Activist, former special-education teacher

Rossana Cambron is an American political activist who has served as national co-chair of the Communist Party USA (CPUSA) since 2019, alongside Joe Sims. A longtime organizer in Los Angeles, she is, according to the party's newspaper People's World, the first woman to lead the CPUSA since Elizabeth Gurley Flynn in 1961 and its first Mexican American national leader.

== Early life and education ==
Cambron was born in El Paso, Texas, and spent her early childhood in Ciudad Juárez, Mexico. Her mother, a U.S.-born citizen, had been taken to Mexico as a small child during the Mexican Repatriation of the 1930s. When Cambron was about seven, around 1963, her mother left Juárez with the children and settled in Los Angeles, where the family lived in public housing. After her mother remarried an educator from East Los Angeles, the family moved to a community near the San Gabriel Mountains.

As a teenager she joined the United Mexican American Students and a student human-rights group, and was influenced by the United Farm Workers grape boycott, in which her older brother was active. She registered to vote on turning 18 in 1974, which she has described as her first political act. She attended Loyola Marymount University, where she joined MEChA and campaigned to preserve the Chicano studies program. Through MEChA she met her husband, Arturo.

== Activism ==
Cambron has said she was anti-communist as a young person, based on her mother's accounts of Mexico, and came to Marxism only after attending the Communist Party's Instituto del Pueblo in East Los Angeles in the late 1970s and then the party's national school. After joining, she worked on efforts to increase Mexican-American representation on the Los Angeles City Council, the Los Angeles County Board of Supervisors, and the Board of Education.

A former special education teacher and union organizer, she has been involved with the Los Angeles Fight for $15 and Occupy Los Angeles campaigns. She is involved with other campaigns, including the peace movement related to the Iraq War and the campaigns Military Families Speak Out and the Poor People's Campaign. A videographer and writer for People's World in Southern California, she has covered issues related to immigration enforcement and deportation.

== Communist Party USA ==
Cambron served as the CPUSA's Southern California district organizer and later as its national membership coordinator. She represented the party at the International Meeting of Communist and Workers' Parties in Athens in 2018.

At the party's 31st National Convention in Chicago on June 23, 2019, delegates elected Cambron and Joe Sims as co-chairs, succeeding John Bachtell. She described the arrangement as a collective style of leadership and said the party aimed to offer its experience to movements rather than direct them. In March 2021, she led the CPUSA delegation to Beijing for a meeting with the Chinese Communist Party. She delivered the closing remarks at the party's 32nd National Convention in Chicago in June 2024 and addressed its National Committee after that year's presidential election.

During the 2026 midterm campaign, as Donald Trump made anti-communism a central theme, Cambron dismissed his rhetoric as a sign of electoral desperation, saying it was "red meat" for the Republican base and predicting that MAGA would lose the midterms.
