= Joe Sims =

Joe Sims may refer to:

- Joe Sims (actor), British actor
- Joe Sims (American football) (born 1969), American football player who played for the Atlanta Falcons for five seasons
- Joe Sims (politician), American politician, co-chair of the Communist Party of the United States of America (CPUSA)
