= National conventions of the Communist Party USA =

Highest decision-making body and quadrennial event of the Communist Party USA

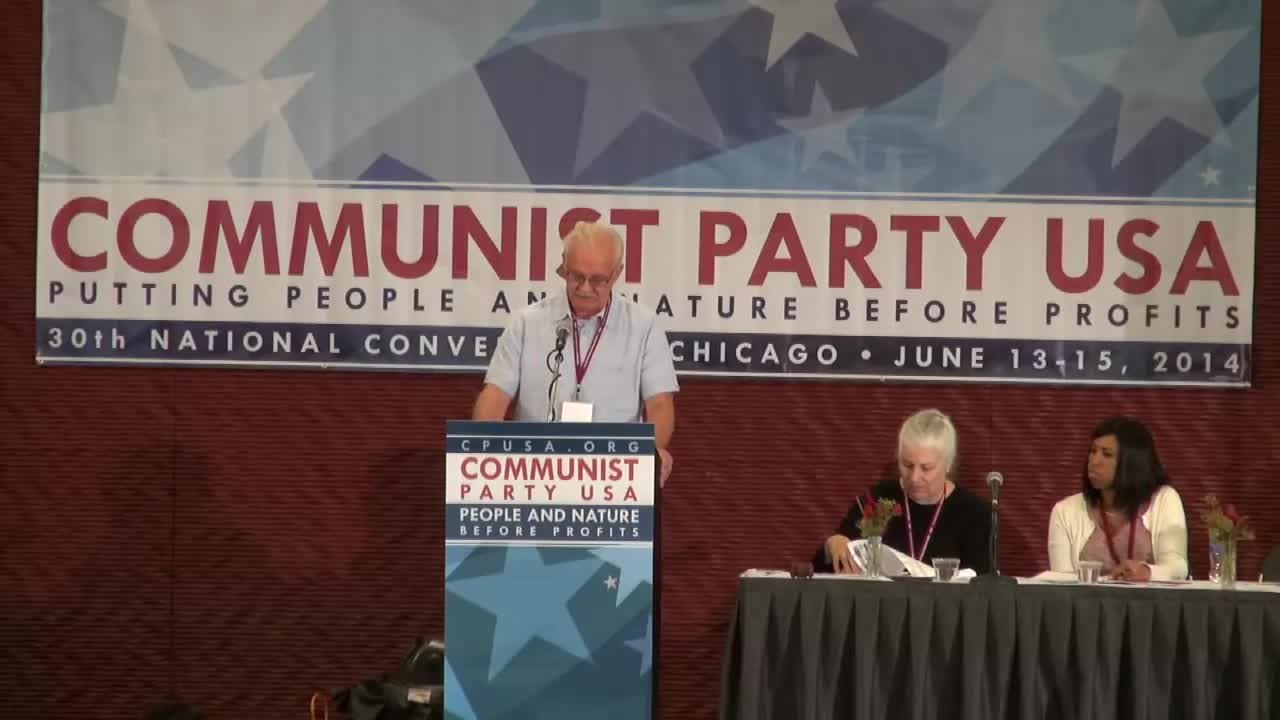
30th convention in Chicago

The Communist Party USA has held 32 official national conventions, including conventions held while the party was known as the Workers Party of America (1921–1924), the Workers (Communist) Party of America (1925–1928), and the Communist Political Association (1943–1946). There were also half a dozen congresses held by the party's organizational predecessors, including the Left Wing Section of the Socialist Party (1919), the competing Communist Labor Party (1919–1921) and Communist Party of America (1919–1921), and the merged (but "underground") Communist Party of America (1921–1923).

== Left Wing Section of the Socialist Party ==
In early 1919, the Socialist Party of America (SPA) was splitting between its socialist right and its communist left, known as the Left Wing Section of the Socialist Party. In May 1919, the Boston SPA, Cleveland SPA, and Left Wing Section of New York City SPA adopted a resolution calling for a national left-wing conference on June 21, 1919. Admittance as "left-wing" was defined as endorsement of the program of the Left Wing Section of NYC SPA.

At the conference, the delegates divided into two groups: The majority, formed around the periodical The Revolutionary Age, wanted to take over SPA at the SPA's September convention in Chicago. The minority wished to exit the SPA and create a Communist Party immediately. The minority withdrew and formed the National Organization Committee for a Communist Party. This group was mainly made up of the suspended language federations and the Socialist Party of Michigan.

The Revolutionary Age majority formed the National Council of the Left Wing Section and began organizing for a takeover of the SPA's convention. However, by late August, the majority of this group decided to abandon this plan and merge into the National Organization Committee to create a new party at a convention in Chicago. A minority, led by Ben Gitlow and John Reed, split with the majority and attempted to infiltrate the Socialist Party convention alone.

- Revolutionary Age Vol I #33 May 31, 1919: "Call for a National Conference of the Left Wing of the American Socialist Party"
- Revolutionary Age Vol II #1 July 5, 1919: Includes manifesto, program, reports, and preliminary minutes of the conference]
- Revolutionary Age Vol II #5 July 5, 1919: Includes first half of the official stenographic proceedings of the conference
- Revolutionary Age Vol II #6 August 9, 1919: Extracts from the remainder of the record
- Revolutionary Age Vol II #7 August 23, 1919: See "The Left Wing Unites" for a chronology of events, including Gitlow and Reed's split

== Communist Party of America (1919) ==
| # | City | Date | Notes |
|---|---|---|---|
| 1st | Chicago | September 1–7, 1919 | Founding Convention of the CPA.: Manifesto, Program, Constitution, and Report to the Communist International; The Communist Vol. I #1 Sept 27, 1919 |
| 2nd | New York | July 13–18, 1920 | First convention after the split of the Michigan and Ruthenberg factions into CLP.: The Communist Vol. II #8 Aug 1, 1920 |
| 3rd | New York | February 1921 | |

== Communist Labor Party/United Communist Party ==
| # | City | Date | Notes |
|---|---|---|---|
| 1st | Chicago | August 31 – September 5, 1919 | Founding Convention of the CLP.: Minutes; Constitution |
| Joint Unity | Bridgman, Michigan | May 26–31, 1920 | Joint Unity convention of the CLP. Merged the CLP with the Ruthenberg group of the CPA. New group named United Communist Party (UCP).: Program and Constitution |
| 2nd | Kingston, New York | December 24, 1920 – January 2, 1921 | |

== Communist Party of America (1921) ==
| # | City | Date | Notes |
|---|---|---|---|
| 1st | Woodstock, New York | May 15–28, 1921 | Joint Unity convention of the CPA and the UCP, merging them into the Communist Party of America (CPA). 1st convention of new CPA. |
| 2nd | Bridgman, Michigan | August 17–22, 1922 | The 1922 Bridgman Convention was raided by the Justice Department.: Agenda; Decisions; Delegates; Reds in America, an anti-communist pamphlet based on documents seized from the Bridgman convention |
| 3rd | New York | April 7, 1923 | Dissolved underground CPA into aboveground Workers Party of America (WPA). |

== Workers Party of America ==
| # | City | Date | Notes |
|---|---|---|---|
| 1st | New York | December 23–26, 1921 | Founding Convention of the WPA. Merged the Workers Council, the CPA's aboveground American Labor Alliance, and CPA-aligned other groups to form the Workers Party of America.: Program and Constitution |
| 2nd | New York | December 24–26, 1922 | Constitution, 2nd ed |
| 3rd | Chicago | December 30, 1923 – January 2, 1924 | Report of the Central Executive Committee; Program and Constitution |
| sp. | Chicago | July 10, 1924 | Nominating Convention of the WPA. Nominated William Z. Foster for President and Benjamin Gitlow for Vice President. |

== Workers (Communist) Party of America ==
| # | City | Date | Notes |
|---|---|---|---|
| 4th | Chicago | August 21–30, 1925 | Changed name to Workers (Communist) Party (WCP). Ruthenberg minority given control of party by Comintern representative.: Report of the Central Executive Committee |
| 5th | New York | August 31 – September 6, 1927 | Confirmed Jay Lovestone as Executive Secretary and Lovestone group as majority on party organs.: From Propaganda Society to Communist Party, a pamphlet by Ruthenberg about the 4th and 5th convnetions |
| sp. | New York | May 25–27, 1928 | Nominating Convention of the WCP. Nominated William Z. Foster for President and Benjamin Gitlow for Vice President.: Acceptance speeches; Platform |

== Communist Party USA ==
| # | City | Date | Notes |
|---|---|---|---|
| 6th | New York | March 4–10, 1929 | Renamed from WCP to Communist Party USA (CPUSA). Lovestone faction won majority. However, Comintern placed Gitlow as Executive Secretary, removing Lovestone. |
| 7th | New York | June 21–25, 1930 | Elected Earl Browder General Secretary. |
| sp. | Chicago | May 28–29, 1932 | Nominating Convention of CPUSA. Nominated William Z. Foster for President and James Ford for Vice President. |
| 8th | Cleveland | April 2–8, 1934 | Report of the Central Committee |
| 9th | New York | June 24–28, 1936 | Report of the Central Committee; Resolutions |
| 10th | New York | May 27–31, 1938 | Report of the Central Committee; Resolutions |
| 11th | New York | May 30–June 2, 1940 | |
| | New York | November 16, 1940 | Special Convention of CPUSA. |
| 12th | New York | May 20–22, 1944 | CPUSA renamed to Communist Political Association (CPA).: Browder's speech: The Road Ahead |
| 13th | New York | July 26–28, 1945 | CPA re-renamed to Communist Party USA (CPUSA). Browder removed as General Secretary, replaced by Eugene Dennis. |
| 14th | New York | August 2–6, 1948 | Endorsed Henry Agard Wallace for President.: Eugene Dennis indicts the Wall Street conspirators. |
| 15th | New York | December 28–30, 1950 | Henry Winston pamphlet: What It Means To Be A Communist; On Guard against Browderism, Titoism, Trotskyism. |
| 16th | New York | February 9–12, 1957 | |
| 17th | New York | December 10–13, 1959 | |
| 18th | New York | June 22–26, 1966 | |
| sp. | New York | July 4–7, 1968 | special delegate convention held at the Hotel Diplomat to nominate presidential ticket; Charlene Mitchell nominated for president and Michael Zagarell nominated for vice president |
| 19th | New York | April 30 – May 4, 1969 | |
| 20th | New York | February 18–21, 1972 | Resolution: Toward Chicano Liberation |
| 21st | Chicago | June 26–29, 1975 | |
| 22nd | Detroit | August 23–26, 1979 | Convention did not nominate a ticket for the 1980 presidential election. Instead, delegates granted the party's central committee the authority to select a ticket, which the central committee later authorized on November 18, 1979, to nominate Gus Hall for president and Angela Davis for vice president.: Resolution: The Path to Native American Liberation |
| 23rd | Cleveland | November 10–13, 1983 | |
| 24th | Chicago | August 13–16, 1987 | |
| 25th | Cleveland | December 5–8, 1991 | First convention after the fall of the Berlin Wall and the failed August coup. |
| 26th | Cleveland | March 1–3, 1996 | First convention after the dissolution of the Soviet Union. |
| 27th | Milwaukee | July 6–8, 2001 | 520 attendees. First convention after the death of Gus Hall. CPUSA adopted "Bill of Rights Socialism" as policy.: Convention web page; Keynote speech by Sam Webb; Constitution, 2001 ed |
| 28th | Chicago | July 1–3, 2005 | "450 participants".: Convention web page; Keynote speech by Sam Webb; Program; Resolutions |
| 29th | New York | May 21–23, 2010 | A "few hundred" attendees.: Convention web page; Main report; Keynote speech by Sam Webb |
| 30th | Chicago | June 13–15, 2014 | Convention had "about 300" or "nearly 375" attendees. While CPUSA ultimately made no changes, discussion subjects included incorporating "Socialism of the 21st Century" into the party platform and dropping Marxism–Leninism from the party constitution.: Convention web page; Keynote speech by Sam Webb; Discussions; Constitution, 2014 ed |
| 31st | Chicago | June 21-23, 2019 | "Over 300" attendees of which "over 200" delegates. Of the 71 members of the new CPUSA National Committee, 28 were women, 14 African-American, 14 Latinx, and 3 LGBTQ. 24 are younger than 50 years old.: Convention web page; Keynote speech by John Bachtell; Main report; Resolutions; Program |
| 32nd | Chicago | June 7-9, 2024 | "Over 350" attendees.: Convention web page; Keynote speech by Joe Sims; Resolutions; Constitution, 2025 ed |

== See also ==
- 1922 Bridgman Convention
- List of conventions of the Democratic Socialists of America
- List of presidential nominating conventions in the United States
