= John Bachtell =

American communist activist (born 1956)

Chair of the Communist Party USA
- In office June 15, 2014 – June 23, 2019
- Preceded by: Sam Webb
- Succeeded by: Rossana Cambron and Joe Sims (as co-chairs)

Personal details
- Born: March 26, 1956 (age 70) Ohio, U.S.
- Party: Communist Party USA
- Education: Antioch College
- Occupation: Political organizer

John Bachtell (born March 26, 1956) is an American communist activist and organizer who served as national chair of the Communist Party USA (CPUSA) from 2014 to 2019. A party member since 1977, he had earlier been the CPUSA's organizer in Illinois and head of its New York district. As chair he was the party's chief public advocate for an electoral strategy built on coalitions with Democrats and organized labor against what he termed the "extreme right."

== Early life ==
Bachtell grew up in Ohio, where his parents were active in the civil rights movement and the antiwar movement. He became interested in communism in college and joined the CPUSA in 1977. He attended Antioch College.

== Career ==
Bachtell was a leader of the Young Communist League USA before serving as the CPUSA's organizer in Illinois and later as head of the party in New York, where he ran for office in the Bronx. He was arrested several times in acts of civil disobedience, including a protest over the 1999 police killing of Amadou Diallo in New York. He has said that most of his political work has been organizing for progressive Democrats and independents, and that he served as a precinct captain for Barack Obama's 2004 U.S. Senate campaign and was active in both of Obama's presidential campaigns.

== Chair of the CPUSA ==
Bachtell was elected chair of the party's National Committee at the 30th National Convention in Chicago in June 2014, succeeding Sam Webb, who did not seek re-election. In an article published shortly after his election, he argued that involvement in elections was essential for the party and called for broad coalitions to contest local, state, and federal offices in both Republican- and Democratic-leaning states.

In January 2015 he wrote that labor and other social movements were unlikely to leave the Democratic Party soon and that building the broadest possible alliance against the "ultra-right" required working within it, a position that drew criticism from conservative outlets. In a 2015 interview with Gawker, he acknowledged that the party had shrunk since the 1980s and carried a "branding problem" from its association with the Soviet Union; he described the Soviet model's reliance on central planning and wage leveling as mistakes, praised Cuba's market reforms, and set out a vision of socialism reached through elections that he called "Bill of Rights socialism." He discussed the distinction between socialism and communism, and accusations of communism directed at Bernie Sanders, on WMNF radio in 2016.

Interviewed by state media outlet Xinhua News Agency in 2018, Bachtell said the CPUSA had about 5,000 members, favored a nonviolent "democratic path" over armed struggle, maintained fraternal relations with the Chinese Communist Party, and regarded the Trump administration's steel and aluminum tariffs as a fraud on working people. He did not stand for a second term, and was succeeded by Rossana Cambron and Joe Sims as co-chairs at the 31st National Convention in June 2019.

== Personal life ==
Bachtell lives in Chicago with his partner and has two adult children.
