= Sam Webb (communist) =

American activist and political leader (born 1945)

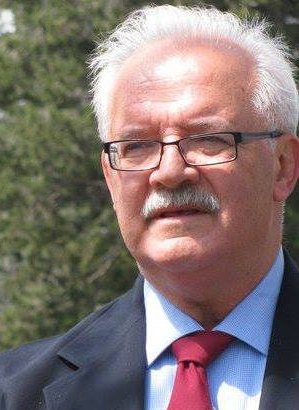
- Webb in 2013

Chairman of the Communist Party USA
- In office 2000–2014
- Preceded by: Gus Hall
- Succeeded by: John Bachtell

Personal details
- Born: June 4, 1945 (age 81) Maine, U.S.
- Party: Communist Party USA (1978–2016)
- Education: St. Francis Xavier University, (B.A.); University of Connecticut, (M.A.)
- Website: www.samwebb.org

Samuel Webb (born June 4, 1945) is an American activist and political leader, who served as the Chairman of the Communist Party USA from 2000 to 2014, succeeding the party's longest running leader, Gus Hall. Webb did not accept nomination to be reelected as chairman at the 30th National Convention of the Communist Party USA in 2014, at which John Bachtell was elected the party's new chairman. Webb continued to serve on the party's National Committee until 2016.

== Biography ==
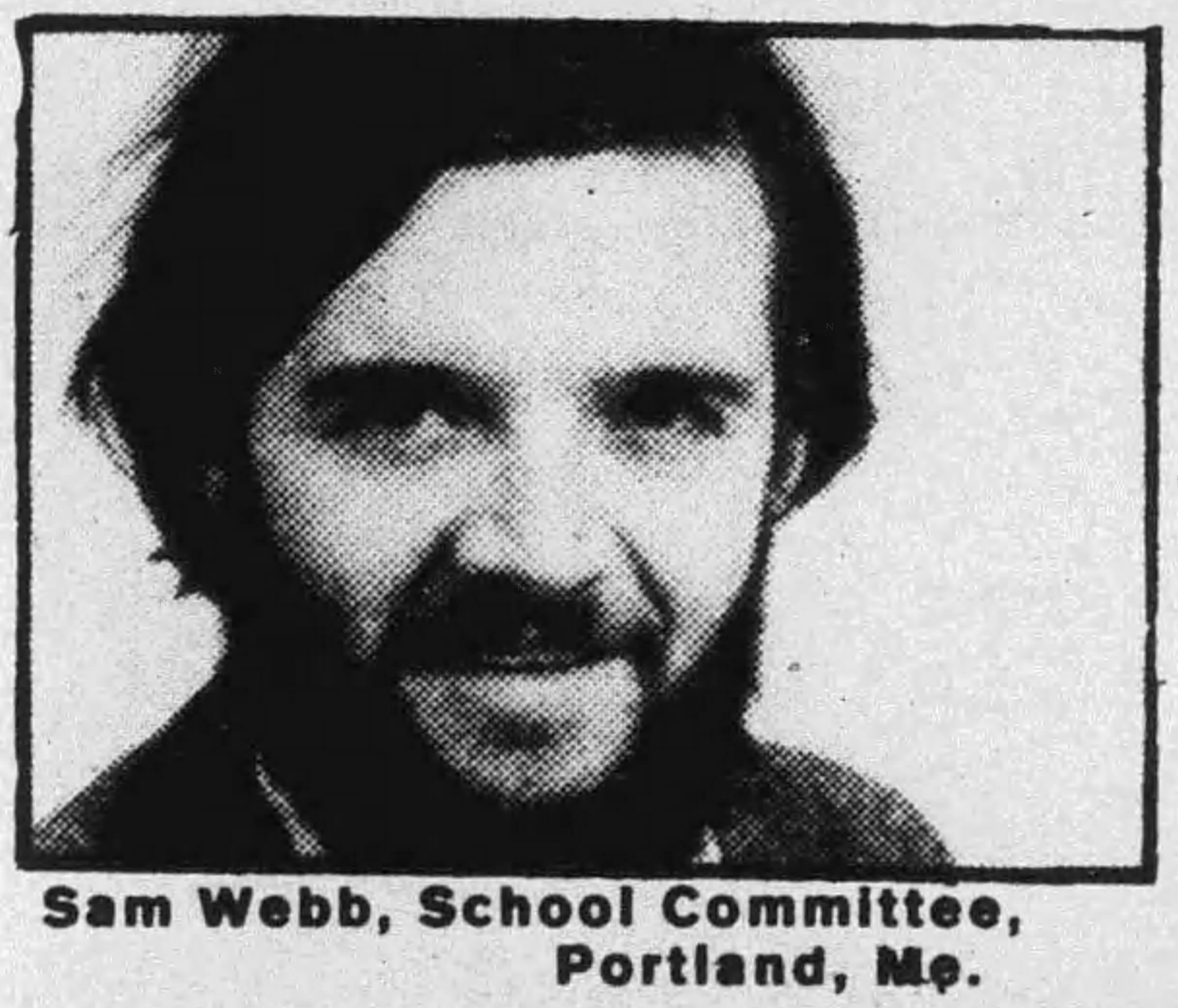
Webb as the Communist Party candidate for School Committee in Portland, Maine, 1973

Samuel Webb was born in Maine and graduated from St. Francis Xavier University in Nova Scotia, Canada, in 1967. He holds an M.A. in economics from the University of Connecticut. He worked as a Communist Party organizer in Michigan from 1978–1988.

Webb led the CPUSA when it made the decision to support some Democratic candidates in the 2004 U.S. presidential election. While the Party regarded both major parties as two capitalist entities in a collaborative dictatorship for established financial institutions, it believed that rule by the Democrats was preferable to rule by the Republicans, arguing that the latter puts the interests of working people in considerable danger. During the 2008 U.S. presidential election, Webb called then-president Barack Obama a "people's advocate" and said that some of his early decisions, in reversing some of President George W. Bush's policies, were praiseworthy.

In 2005 Webb wrote Reflections on Socialism, a paper reflecting ideas that Webb first presented at the 2005 Left Forum in New York City. This paper points out that socialism is once again being discussed in the trade union and student movements, in popular magazines and certainly in the halls of power worldwide.

Webb traveled to China, United Kingdom, Cuba, and Vietnam, in order to meet communist and socialist leaders.

On February 4, 2011 Webb published an essay in the Communist Party magazine Political Affairs, "A Party of Socialism in the 21st Century: What It Looks Like, What It Says, and What It Does". It set forth positions that came under sharp criticism from Communist parties across the world, as well as a portion of CPUSA members, as being revisionist, social democratic, and anti-Communist. These parties included the Communist Parties of Canada, Mexico, Germany and Greece as well as the CPUSA Houston club, the Austin Hogan Transit Club of NYC, the CPUSA Tucson Club, the LA Metro Club, and the Communist Party of San Francisco.

In 2014, Webb did not seek reelection as the National Committee's chairman and stepped down from office. At the 30th National Convention of the Communist Party USA, John Bachtell was elected as the new Chairman of the National Committee, thereby ending Webb's 14 years as the party's leader.

At the end of the 2016 Democratic primary, Webb defended Hillary Clinton and urged supporters of Bernie Sanders to support her in the general election.

Party political offices
Preceded by Gus Hall	Chair of Communist Party USA; 2000–2014	Succeeded by John Bachtell
