= 1968 Communist National Convention =

- 1968 presidential election
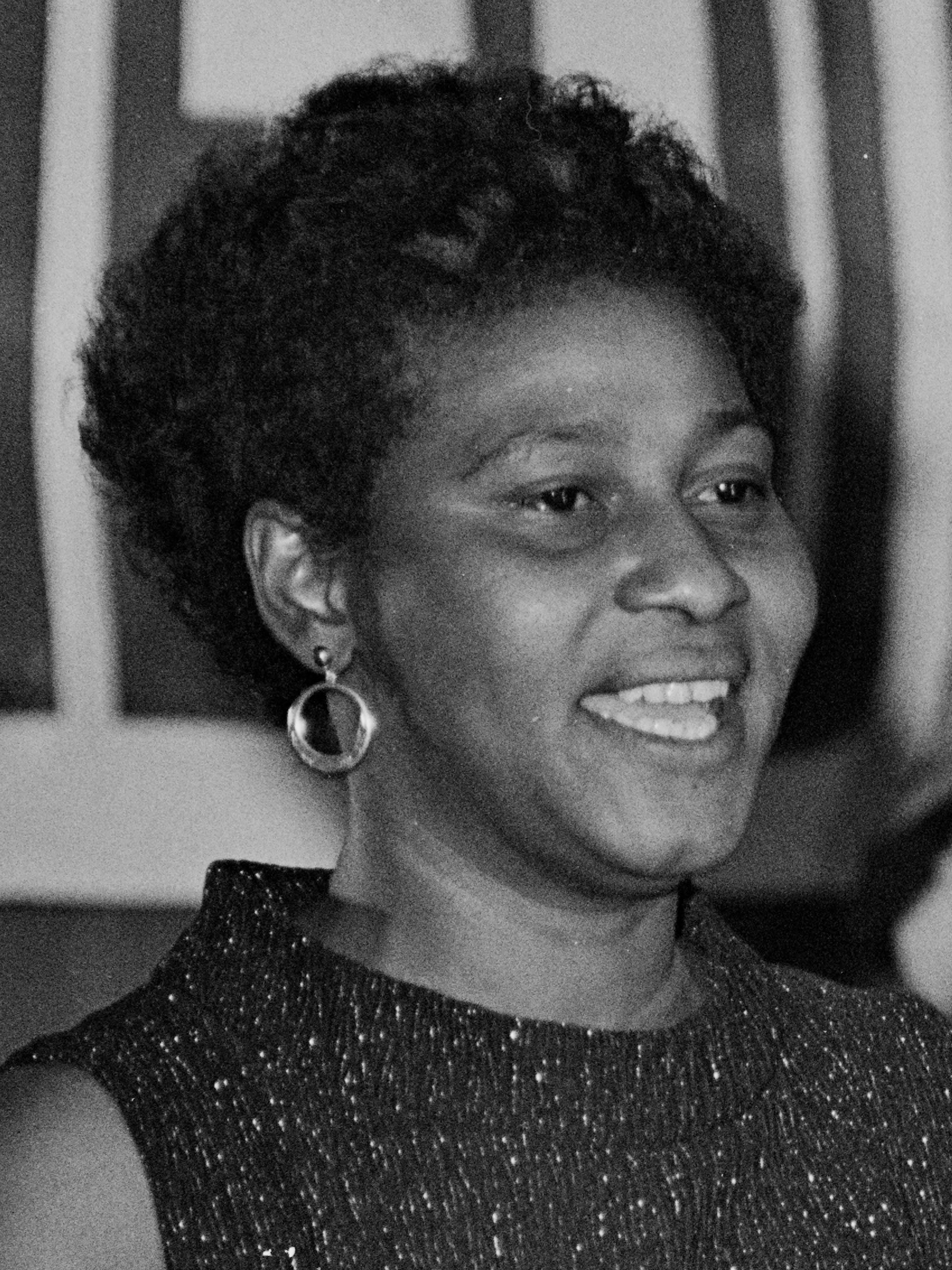
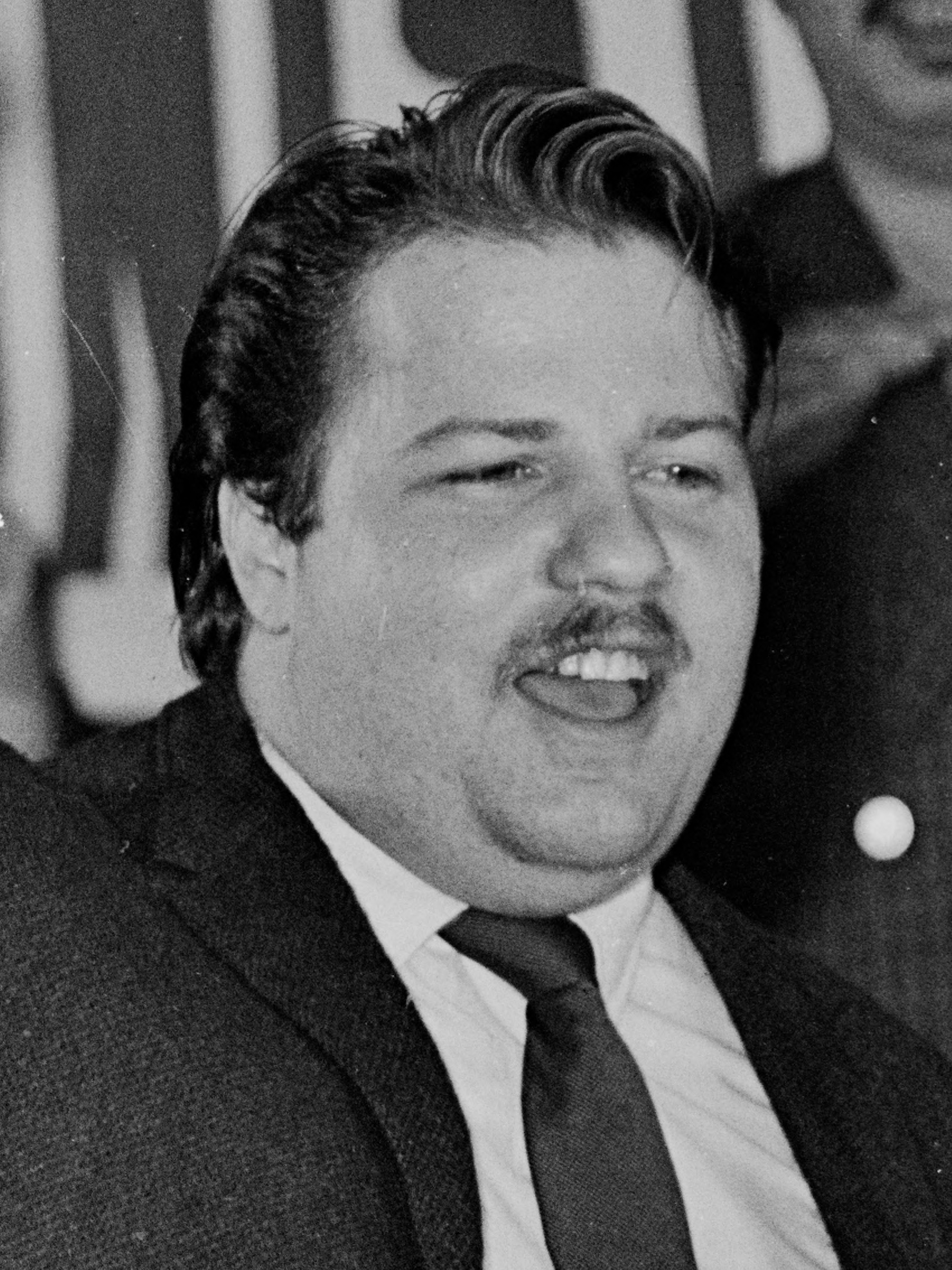
- Nominees (Mitchell and Zagarell)

Convention
- Dates: July 4–7, 1968
- City: Manhattan, New York City, New York
- Venue: Hotel Diplomat

Candidates
- Presidential nominee: Charlene Mitchell
- Vice-presidential nominee: Michael Zagarell

The 1968 Communist National Convention was held July 4–7, 1968 at the Hotel Diplomat in New York City. It saw the nomination of Charlene Mitchell for president (the first African American to run for the presidency of the United States), and the nomination of Michael Zagarell for vice president.

== Background ==
By the time of the 1968 United States presidential election, Communist Party USA's stature had shrunk due to a variety of factors. This included suppression by the federal government, conflicts within the party, as well as a loss of support to newer and emerging political forces.

The party had last nominated its own ticket for president in 1940. The nomination of a presidential candidate came amid a reemergence of the party to "overground" political activity. The party had previously gone underground amid persecution of communists in the 1950s during an era of Red Scare and McCarthyism.

== Logistics ==
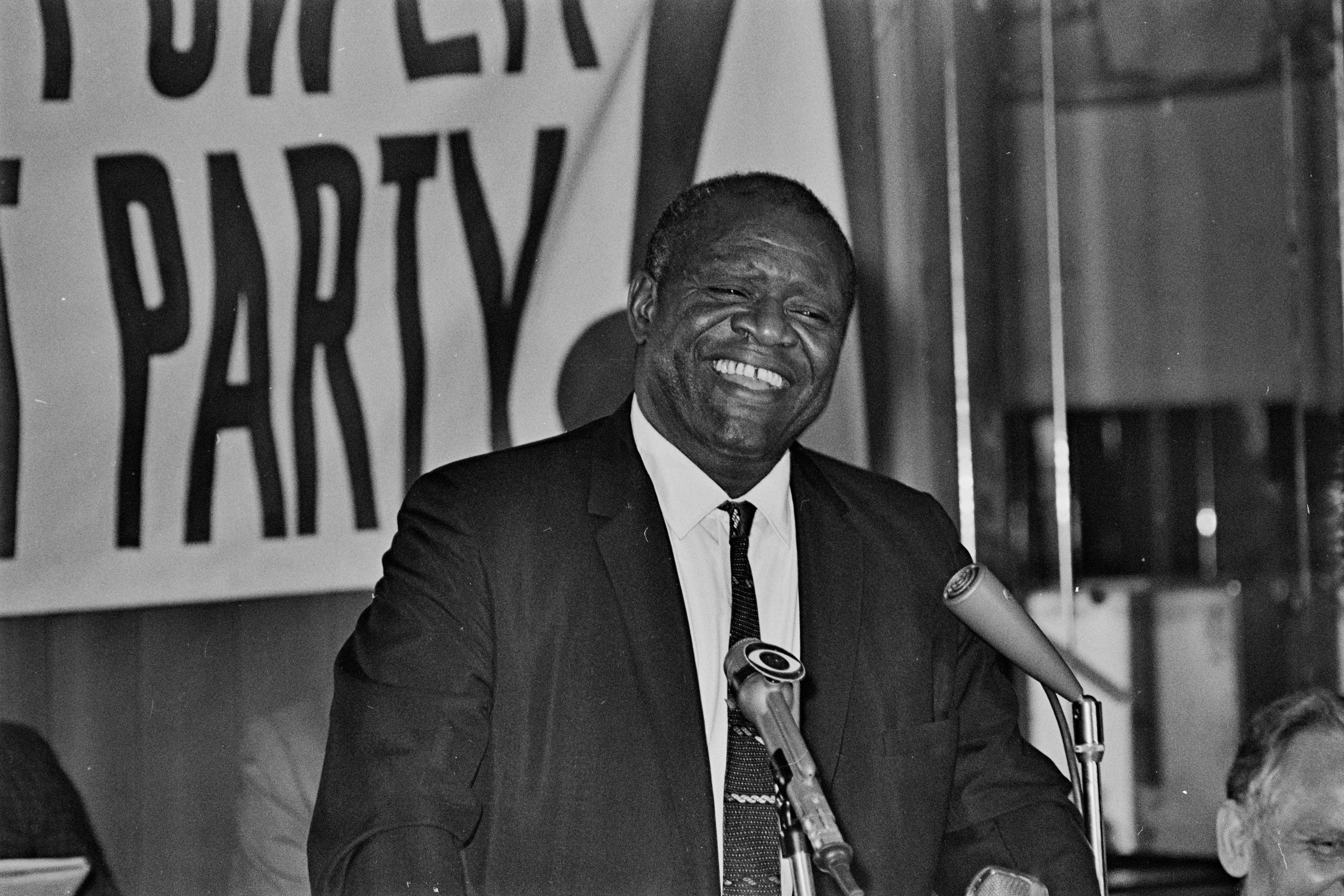
Henry Winston speaking at the convention

The convention was held July 4–7, 1968, at the Hotel Diplomat in New York City. The convention was attended by approximately 300 delegates.

== Nominations ==
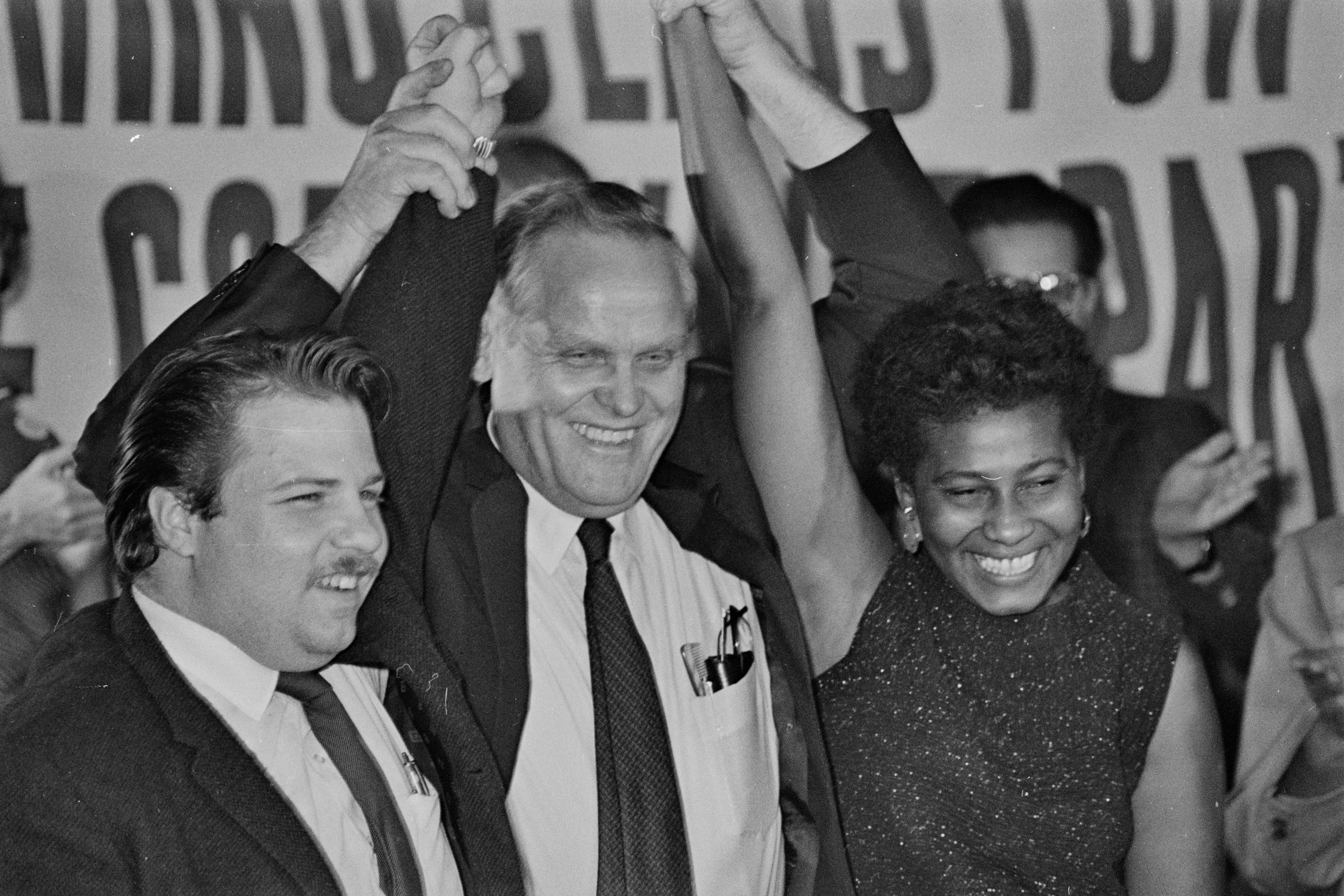
Party chairman Gus Hall poses with the nominees during the convention

Party chairman Gus Hall had previously announced his intent to run as the party's presidential nominee, but bowed out at the convention and instead recommended the nomination of Charlene Mitchell (a leading party figure and organizer).

The convention nominated Mitchell for president and Michael Zagarell (the party's youth director) for vice president. Mitchell delivered an acceptance speech to the convention. Zagarell was ineligible to take office as vice president, as he was twelve years below the age minimum of 35.

In her convention acceptance speech, she declared she intended to "put an 'open-occupancy' sign on the White House lawn". At a press conference after her nomination, Mitchell recognized that she did not have a realistic chance of being elected herself in 1968, but hoped to use her campaign to highlight solutions to problems.

Mitchell's nomination was historic for her being the first African American woman to seek the presidency of the United States. However, the historic nature of her candidacy was largely overlooked at the time, and given little media fanfare. Mitchell was an understated candidate, who ran a rather low-key campaign. As a result, even African-American centric media outlets paid her nomination little attention, being interested in covering flashier affairs such as the contest between Eldridge Cleaver and Dick Gregory to capture support in the new Peace and Freedom Party ahead of its nominating convention. Mainstream outlets either treated Mitchell's being a black woman as further exacerbating the lack of viability for the Communist ticket, or as a ploy by Communists to aggravate divisions in the United States. The Chicago Tribune alleged that her nomination was a symbolic gesture intended to "dramatize what the Communists perceive to be the nation’s major discontents".
