= Joe Sims (politician) =

American communist activist and editor (born 1950s)

Co-chair of the Communist Party USA
- Incumbent
- Assumed office June 23, 2019 Serving with Rossana Cambron
- Preceded by: John Bachtell (as chair)

Personal details
- Born: Joe Sims Jr.
- Party: Communist Party USA
- Occupation: Editor, political activist

Joe Sims Jr. is an American communist activist and editor who has served as national co-chair of the Communist Party USA (CPUSA) since 2019, alongside Rossana Cambron. A longtime figure in the party's press, he edited its theoretical journal Political Affairs and has been a senior editor of its online newspaper People's World. Since his election he has become the party's most visible public spokesman, frequently quoted in national media on the CPUSA's membership, program, and response to anti-communist rhetoric from Donald Trump.

== Early activism ==
Sims was active in the CPUSA's youth wing, the Young Workers Liberation League, and attended the party's extraordinary conference in Milwaukee in April 1982 as the League's section chairman for Washington, D.C. By the mid-1990s he sat on the party's Organization Commission, and in 1998 he was among the signatories of the call that led to the founding of the Black Radical Congress, later serving on the editorial board of its journal BRC Today.

== Party press ==
Sims served as editor of Political Affairs, the CPUSA's theoretical journal, during the 2000s, and later as a senior editor of People's World. In a 2016 interview he described his role as coordinating the party's organizational and social-media work, framing it as an effort to apply the Leninist idea of building a party around its press to the internet age.

In May 2026, Sims announced that the party would re-establish Political Affairs, which had stopped publishing and merged into People's World in 2016.

== Co-chair of the CPUSA ==
Sims was elected national co-chair of the CPUSA, together with Los Angeles organizer Rossana Cambron, at the party's 31st National Convention in Chicago in June 2019, succeeding John Bachtell at the end of his five-year term. The Morning Star noted the election of an African-American man from New York and a Mexican-American woman from Los Angeles to lead the party into its second century.

=== Electoral strategy ===
In April 2021 the party, under Sims and Cambron, announced it would resume running candidates for office after a hiatus of more than three decades, concentrating on nonpartisan local races. Sims argued at the time that the organization could not call itself a political party without fielding candidates. The strategy produced the party's first electoral victories in decades in November 2025, when CPUSA members won local seats in Ithaca, New York, Bangor, Maine, and Cambridge, Massachusetts. Sims keynoted the party's 32nd National Convention in Chicago in June 2024 and appeared on C-SPAN the same month to discuss the party's approach to that year's elections. After the 2024 presidential election he told a meeting of the party's National Committee that Trump had won "on the margins" and that resistance to the incoming administration was already under way.

=== Membership claims ===
Sims has been the party's principal public source on its size. In 2023 he told the Associated Press that the CPUSA had roughly 15,000 people on its membership list, while acknowledging that not all were active. In early 2026 he wrote that the party had recruited about 20,000 members since Trump's first election but that 9,000 of them had since dropped off its lists, and later that year he put active membership at around 11,000. Reporters have noted the party's long history of overstating its self-reported numbers.

=== Response to Trump-era anti-communism ===
As Trump made "communism" a central theme of his attacks on Democrats and democratic socialists in 2026, Sims became a frequent media counterpoint. He told Cronkite News that the party advocates a "Bill of Rights socialism" tailored to the United States, rejects any universal model of socialism, and does not envision single-party rule, while distinguishing the CPUSA from democratic socialists by its view that capitalism must be fundamentally changed rather than reformed. After Trump described communism as the greatest threat facing the country, Sims issued a statement saying he knew of no Democratic candidate for Congress who was a party member. A Slate profile that September, reported from the party's Manhattan headquarters, portrayed Sims as the face of a small organization that nonetheless claimed 20,000 membership applications since 2016.

== See also ==
- List of Communist Party USA election results
