= Rummagers League =

The Rummagers League was the final name of a small communist group that existed in the United States from 1919 to 1920.

The organization was founded in Terre Haute, Indiana in November 1919 as the Industrial Communists. While endorsing the Third International, its programme was unorthodox for communists groups of the period. It did not mention soviets, dictatorship of the proletariat or violent insurrection. It claimed the second paragraph of the American declaration of independence as its "legal basis". The new party recognized six "basic industries" in modern society: agriculture, mining, transportation, manufacturing, construction and education. The party, therefore, should be organized around this basis, reflecting the capitalist structure in miniature. Each branch of the party would thus be organized with representatives of these six industries, and like wise the party congresses would be held according to this principle. Daniel Bell detected the influence of De Leonism in its ideology.

The Industrial Communists did not believe that the other communist factions were capable of carrying out a socialist revolution, "any one of them if put into power could not establish industrial communism". On the other hand, it clearly had great ambitions for itself, "The Industrial Communists have been so organized that when it (the party) goes into power we will have industrial communism,". The party established its headquarters in Chicago in June 1920 and in August issued an appeal to the other socialist and communist parties to join it in a unity convention in November of that year. They apparently did not get any response.

By late 1921 they appear to have changed their name to the Proletarian Socialist Party and issued at least one leaflet under that name. By January 1922 they announced that they had abandoned their complex industrial organizing plan and became an educational society, the Rummagers League. The name was taken from the preamble of their constitution "We rummage the field of history and science so as to develop the keenest intellect possible." They proposed to establish a "Rummagers Institute" in Chicago and establish study circles "in every locality for the purpose of extending knowledge of the worlds material and historical development."

The membership of the group is unknown, but is thought to be small. In 1924 James Oneal estimated that the group had 25 members. Later he wrote "At most, the organization did not have more than one or two hundred members". Nor is the exact fate of the group known. Oneal states that after the formation of the Rummagers League "They dragged out a precarious existence till the end of the year and then disappeared." Walter Goldwater suggests the group liquidated itself, with most members going into the Communist Party.

== Publications ==
Almost all we know about this sect comes from the small number of its periodicals known to scholars. Industrial Communist is listed as number 95 in Walter Goldwaters bibliography of radical periodicals. Goldwater notes that only "three or four" issues of the paper appeared, and that they were unnumbered. He gives Sept. 1920 as the date for the first issue and Oct. 1921 for the last. In James Oneals book on the American communist movement he gives his sources as the Industrial Communist issues of Sept. 1920 and March 1921. Earlier he had described it as "a small monthly of four pages". Despite Goldwaters note that the periodical was unnumbered, Oneal mentions that one issue was numbered seven, and that the eleventh number of the periodical became The Rummager (January 1922) and announced the formation of the Rummagers League. Goldwater cites only one issue of The Rummager located, also January 1922.
