= Charlene Mitchell =

American politician (1930–2022)

Charlene Alexander Mitchell
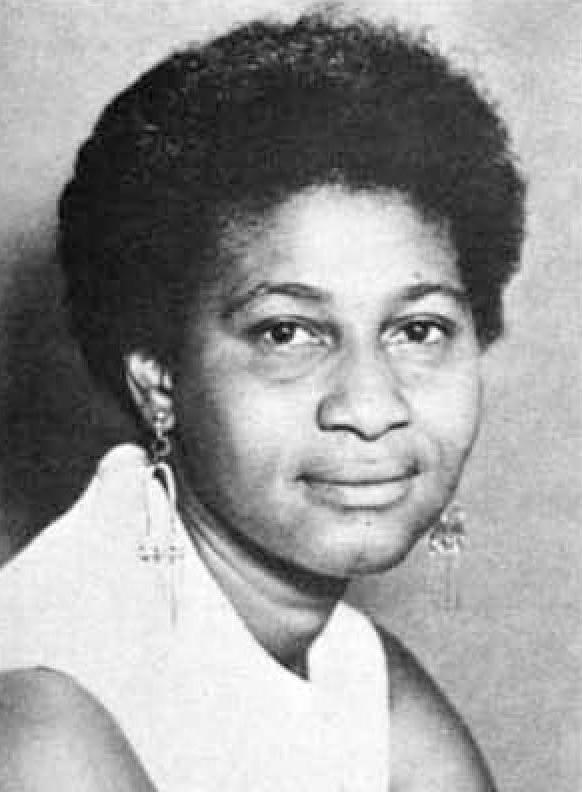
- Mitchell in 1968
- Born: June 8, 1930; Cincinnati, Ohio, U.S.
- Died: December 14, 2022 (aged 92); New York City, U.S.
- Occupations: International socialist, feminist; labor; civil rights activist
- Spouse(s): Bill Mitchell (m. 1950, divorced) Michael Welch (div.)
- Children: 1

Charlene Alexander Mitchell (June 8, 1930 – December 14, 2022) was an American international socialist, feminist, labor and civil rights activist. In 1968, she became the first Black woman candidate for President of the United States.

In the 1970s, she became a leader in efforts to support the defense of Angela Davis, founded the National Alliance Against Racist and Political Repression, campaigned on behalf of the defenses of Joan Little and the Wilmington Ten, and focused her activism on anti-apartheid efforts.

Mitchell joined the Communist Party USA (CPUSA) at the age of 16, and is considered to have been one of the most influential leaders in the party in the late 1950s and the 1960s. After leaving the party, she became a leader of the Committees of Correspondence for Democracy and Socialism (CCDS) in the 1990s.

== Early life and education ==
Born Charlene Alexander in Cincinnati, Ohio, on June 8, 1930, she moved with her parents and seven siblings to Chicago at the age of nine. In the early 20th century, her parents had moved north during the Great Migration of Black Southerners. During the Second World War, she grew up in the Frances Cabrini Rowhouses in the Near North Side of Chicago and took classes at the Moody Bible Institute.

She joined the Communist Party USA at the age of 16, and had joined the youth branch, the American Youth for Democracy, when she was 13. Early activism by Mitchell in the 1940s included participation in a successful sit-in protest against segregated seating in a theater, with white students sitting in the "colored only" balcony and Black students sitting in the "whites only" section below.

In Chicago, her father was a precinct captain for Rep. William L. Dawson, a Pullman porter, a hod carrier, and a labor activist. Mitchell attended Herzl Junior College in Chicago and moved to Los Angeles in 1955.

== Political career ==
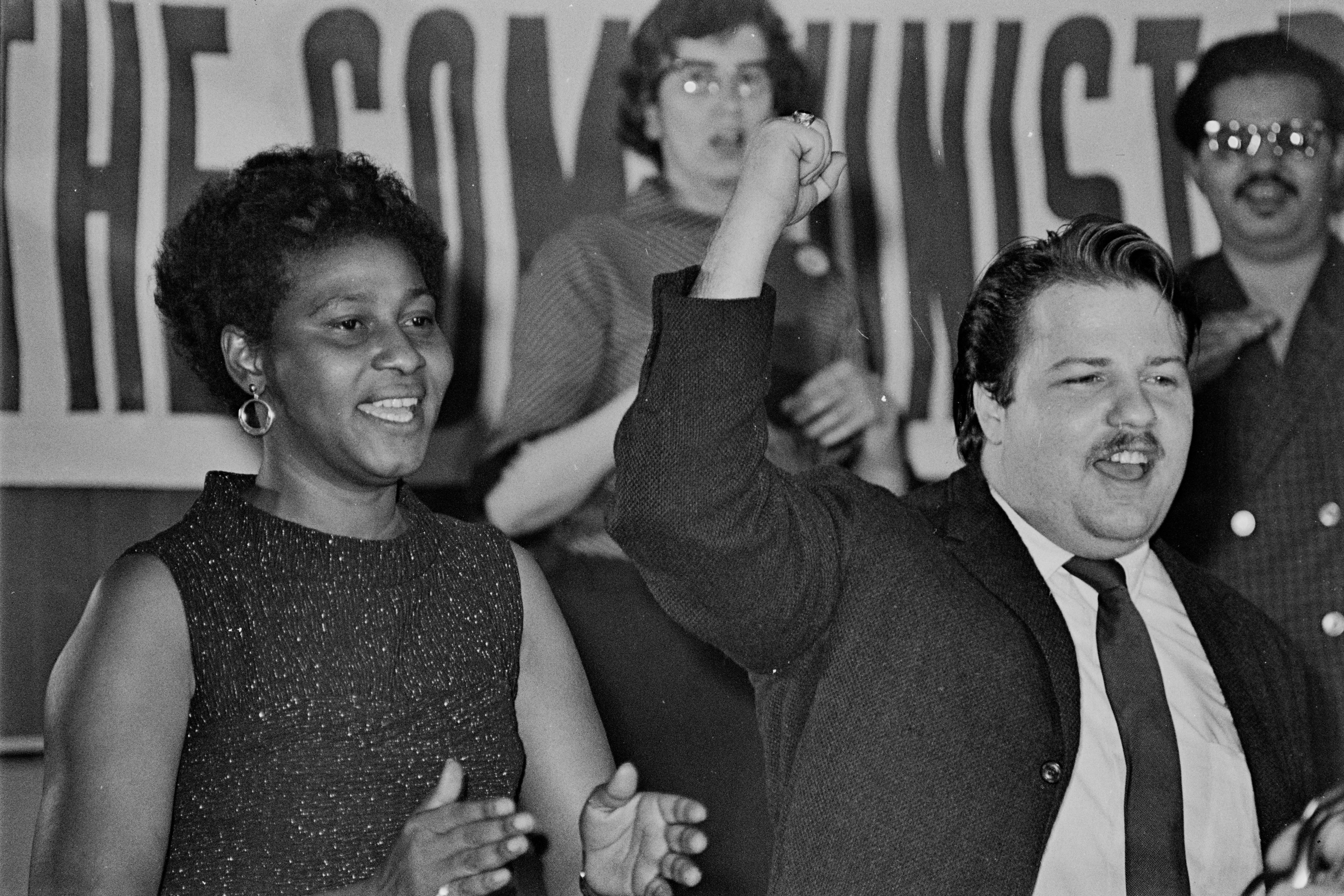
Mitchell and her running mate, Mike Zagarell, at the 1968 Communist Party USA National Convention

In 1958, Mitchell joined the national committee of the Communist Party USA (CPUSA). Her 1959 testimony before a panel of the House Un-American Activities Committee received attention due to her refusals to answer questions and her challenge to the authority of the committee. In Los Angeles, she founded the Che-Lumumba Club, an all-Black chapter of CPUSA, in the 1960s. Angela Davis worked with Mitchell and the Che-Lumumba Club, including to organize protests. Mitchell's brother and sister-in-law Franklin and Kendra Alexander were also active in the Che-Lumumba Club. Mitchell moved to New York City in 1968.

As a third-party candidate in the election of 1968, nominated at the National convention of Communist Party USA, Mitchell was the first Black woman to run for President of the United States. She represented the Communist Party USA (CPUSA) and her running mate was Michael "Mike" Zagarell, the National Youth Director of the party. They were entered on the ballots in only four states and received about 1000 votes.

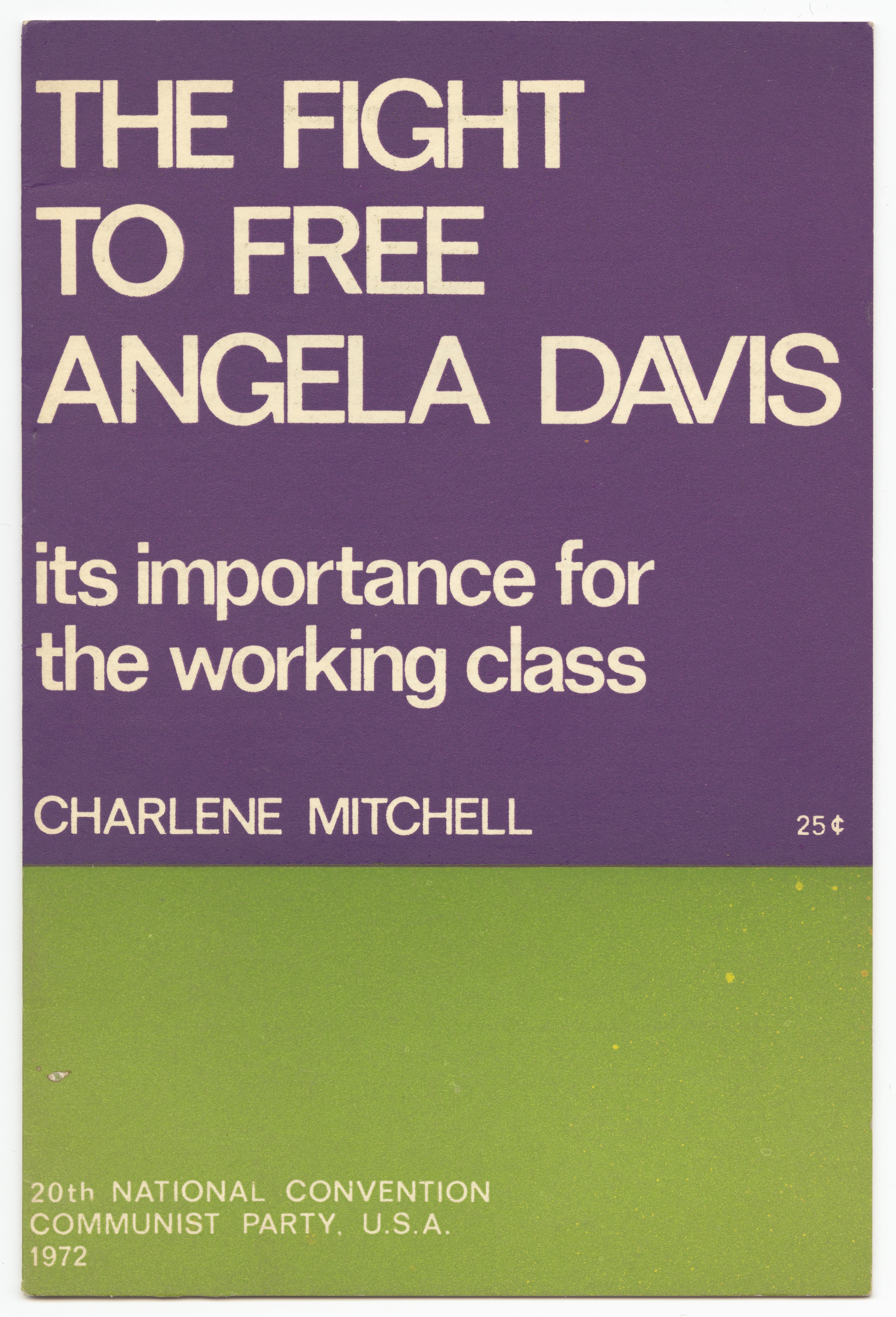
The Fight to Free Angela Davis by Charlene Mitchell (1972)

After Davis was arrested in 1970, Mitchell led efforts to support her defense. Mitchell worked with Kendra and Franklin Alexander on the campaign to free Davis, including as an investigator for the National United Committee to Free Angela Davis and with a small team and Davis to coordinate political and legal defenses.

According to Sol Stern at the New York Times in 1971, it was "the best-organized, most broad-based defense effort in the recent history of radical political trials--more potent than that afforded to any of the Panther leaders or the Chicago Seven." Davis later described the effort as "one of the most impressive mass international campaigns of the 20th century" and said about Mitchell, "I have never known anyone as consistent in her values, as collective in her outlook on life, as firm in her trajectory as a freedom fighter."

After the acquittal of Davis in 1972, Mitchell founded the National Alliance Against Racist and Political Repression, with a focus on police brutality and the legal system. Mitchell also campaigned on behalf of the defenses of Joan Little and the Wilmington Ten.

Mitchell began to focus on anti-apartheid efforts in the 1970s, and visited Nelson Mandela in South Africa after his release from prison in 1990. Benjamin Chavis has said that in the 1980s, James Baldwin referred to Mitchell as "the Joan of Arc of Harlem" because "she dares to utter unspeakable truth to power."

In 1988, Mitchell ran as an Independent Progressive for U.S. Senator from New York against the incumbent Daniel Patrick Moynihan. He was re-elected by a large margin. Mitchell received 0.2% of the vote to finish fourth out of seven candidates, ahead of the candidates from the Workers World Party, Libertarian Party and Socialist Workers Party.

After the death of prominent CPUSA member Henry Winston in 1986, Mitchell and other party members questioned the direction of the party. They planned a reform movement and matters came to a head at a convention in December 1991. Many who signed a letter urging reform were purged by Gus Hall from the CPUSA's national committee, including Mitchell, Angela Davis, Kendra Alexander and other African-American leaders. Others who left the Party then included Herbert Aptheker, Gil Green, and Michael Myerson.

Mitchell became an elected leader of the Committees of Correspondence for Democracy and Socialism (CCDS) in the 1990s. In 1993, Mitchell attended the Foro de São Paulo in Havana as an observer from the CCDS. In 1994 she served as an official international observer of the first democratic elections in post-apartheid South Africa, where Nelson Mandela was elected president.

== Personal life and death ==
Mitchell married Bill Mitchell in 1950 and they had a son in 1951. After their divorce, she married Michael Welch and they later divorced. In 2007, she experienced a stroke. Mitchell died in New York City’s Amsterdam Nursing Home on December 14, 2022, at the age of 92.

== Selected works ==
- The Fight to Free Angela Davis: Its Importance for the Working Class, New York: New Outlook Publishers (1972), ISBN 0-87898-085-7
- Equality: its time has come, New York: New Outlook Publishers (1985)

== Notes and references ==
Party political offices
Preceded by James W. Ford	Communist Party USA Presidential candidate 1968 (lost)	Succeeded by Gus Hall
