= Charles Curtiss =

American communist

Charles Curtiss (born Samuel Kurz; July 4, 1908 – December 20, 1993) was an American communist.

== Early life ==
Samuel Kurz was born on July 4, 1908, in Chicago, the son of poor immigrants from Poland. He changed his name to Charles Curtiss and earned his living by working as a miner and sailor, before finally becoming a skilled printer.

== Career ==
In 1928, Curtiss joined the Communist League of America, the Trotskyist movement led by James P. Cannon. As a printer, Curtiss took responsibility for producing the movement's weekly paper The Militant.

In 1932, Curtiss moved to Los Angeles to build the Trotskyist movement on the West Coast. In 1938, the Communist League became the Socialist Workers Party (SWP).

Curtiss, who was fluent in Spanish, was repeatedly sent as a representative of the American Trotskyist movement to Mexico in the 1930s. There, he was known as Carlos Curtiss. He also visited Leon Trotsky in Coyoacán several times. From June 1939 to August 1940, Curtiss lived in the Trotsky household and his wife, Lillian Ilstien, who he had married in 1935, served as secretary for Trotsky's wife Natalia Sedova.

Curtiss functioned as Trotsky's primary link with the Mexican Trotskyists. It would have been illegal and unwise under the terms on which Trotsky was granted asylum in Mexico for Trotsky to maintain direct political contact with radical communist revolutionaries in his host country. Curtiss also tried to resolve the personal differences between Trotsky and Mexican artist Diego Rivera. Curtiss was not present on August 20, 1940, when Trotsky was attacked and killed by Stalinist agent Ramón Mercader, who had infiltrated the household, but it is said that Curtiss had always been suspicious of Mercader and had warned Trotsky to be careful around him.

After the assassination of Trotsky, Curtiss and his wife returned to the United States and the SWP, living and working in Los Angeles for a couple of years. When 18 of the SWP's most prominent leaders, including James P. Cannon, Farrell Dobbs and Carl Skoglund, were sentenced to jail according to the Smith Act, for opposing U.S. involvement in World War II, Curtiss moved to New York City to help take over the leadership of the party. However, Curtiss was soon drafted into the U.S. Army and sent to Italy to fight in the war.

== Later life ==
After the war, Curtiss returned to the SWP, but left the party in 1951. However, his wife Lillian remained in the SWP for many years.

Curtiss died of heart failure in Los Angeles on December 20, 1993.
