= Albert Glotzer =

Albert Glotzer (1908–1999), also known as Albert Gates, was a professional stenographer and founder of the Trotskyist movement in the United States. He was best remembered as the court reporter for the 1937 John Dewey Commission that examined the Stalinist charges against Trotsky in Mexico City and as a memoirist and activist in the social democratic movement in his later years.

== Biography ==
=== Early years ===
Albert Glotzer was born November 7, 1908, to a Jewish family in Pinsk, Belorussia (modern-day Belarus), then part of the Russian Empire. Glotzer and his family emigrated to Chicago when he was four.

=== Political career ===
Politically active since childhood, he was selling socialist literature on the street corners by age eight, and joined the Young Communist League at fifteen. By the end of the 1920s Glotzer was elected a member of the National Executive Committee of the Young Workers (Communist) League.

In the fall of 1928 Glotzer and his Chicago co-thinker Arne Swabeck were expelled from the Workers (Communist) Party and its youth section for espousing Trotskyism. News of the ouster of Glotzer and Swabeck was front-page news in the second issue of The Militant, the first American Trotskyist newspaper.

Glotzer was a delegate to the founding convention of the Communist League of America (Opposition) (CLA) in May 1929 and was elected as one of five members of the governing National Council of the fledgling organization. At that time Glotzer moved to New York City to work at the new organization's national office.

Glotzer was involved in the factional difficulties that best the CLA from the very beginning. He originally gravitated toward James P. Cannon and Arne Swabeck, with whom he had worked in Chicago, but soon became a close ally of Max Shachtman, who felt that Cannon was running the party in a bureaucratic and manner.

In 1931, Glotzer traveled with his wife to visit Leon Trotsky at Prinkipo, Turkey, where he spent some weeks as a secretary and guard to the exiled Soviet leader. According to Glotzer's wife they subsisted on the fish they caught in the Sea of Marmara. Trotsky advised a truce between the two factions, and Glotzer returned to the US to go on a national speaking tour on the dangers of fascism.

By June 1932, Glotzer's criticism of Cannon became explicit. Together with Martin Abern and Max Shachtman, Glotzer made charges that Cannon had shown signs of an "ingrowing conservatism" after 1928, taking long absences from party duty over "personal difficulties" and leaving operations in the hands of a tightly knit group of close personal supporters who controlled criticism in the party press. Abern, Glotzer, and Shachtman declared that "new forces" were needed to revitalize the flagging CLA. Relations between the top leaders were patched up at this juncture and no split of the organization ensued.

When the unity negotiations with A.J. Muste's American Workers Party began in 1934, Cannon and Shachtman became factional allies. Glotzer felt alienated from the policy, however. He returned to Chicago but stayed loyal to the Trotskyist movement.

In April 1937 the skilled stenographer Glotzer was sent to Mexico City to serve as court reporter at the John Dewey Commission called to hear charges made by the Joseph Stalin regime against Leon Trotsky. This commission heard evidence for a week before rendering a verdict clearing Trotsky of charges of espionage and sabotage levied against him in the ongoing Moscow Trials. The transcript produced by Glotzer was later published in book form by the American Trotskyist movement.

In the United States the Trotskyists emerged from the Socialist party as the Socialist Workers Party. After the Nazi-Soviet Pact and the beginning of the Second World War, Shachtman, Abern, and others condemned the USSR's alliance with Nazi Germany and their cooperative invasion of Poland. Schachtman condemned the USSR's invasion of Finland. Viewing these invasions, Shachtman argued that the USSR was not a "workers' state", but a new form of class-stratified society, "bureaucratic collectivism", in which workers and peasants were exploited by a class of bureaucratic elites.

Glotzer joined with Shachtman and helped to found the Workers Party, later known as the Independent Socialist League, which was absorbed by the Socialist Party in 1958. In 1972, the Socialist Party voted to rename itself Social Democrats, USA (SDUSA). Glotzer served on the SDUSA's National Committee for the rest of his life.

=== Death and legacy ===
Albert Glotzer died February 18, 1999. He was 90 years old at the time of his death.

Albert Glotzer's papers are housed in 67 archival boxes at the Hoover Institution Archives at Stanford University in Palo Alto, California. An on-line finding guide is available.

Besides remaining a speaker Glotzer was active in the stenographers union, Federation of Shorthand Reporters, AFL-CIO. He served four terms as union president during the 1960s.

== Works ==
- The Case of Leon Trotsky: Report of Hearings on the Charges Made Against Him in the Moscow Trials. New York: Harper, 1937 (stenographer).
- Incentive Pay: The Speed-up New Style. New York: Workers Party, 1945 (as Albert Gates).
- "Introduction" (as Albert Gates) to Leon Trotsky Marxism in the United States. New York: Workers Party, 1947.
- Trotsky: Memoir and Critique. Buffalo, NY: Prometheus Books, 1989.
