= Oliver Carlson =

American teacher, activist

Oliver Carlson (1899–1991) was founder of the Young Communist League of America among other Communist organizations and then served as an anti-communist government witness who specialized in Communist infiltration in Hollywood.

== Background ==
Oliver Carlson was born on July 31, 1899, in Gotland, Sweden. In 1919, he was a member of the Intercollegiate Socialist Society. He studied law for one year at the University of Michigan at Ann Arbor.

== Career ==
=== YPSL ===
In 1914, Carlson joined the Young People's Socialist League (YPSL) while living in the Muskegon and Detroit, Michigan, areas. During 1918–1919, Carlson served as YPSL national secretary.

=== YWL and YCL ===
After the Communist Party formed in 1919 in the US, Carlson became a communist. During winter 1920–1921, Carlson (as "H. Edwards") attended a second convention of the United Communist Party in Kingston, New York, which voted to establish the "Young People's Communist League." In April 1921, he attended a congress in Germany of the Young Communist International, where he received funding. The meeting then moved to Moscow, which Carlson (as "Tucker") attended.

In January 1922, as the Workers Party of America formed, the Party agreed to found a National Organizing Committee (NOC) for the Young Workers League of America (YWL), with Carlson as secretary. The group started a second publication called Youth, soon changed to The Young Worker with Carlson as both YWLA secretary and Young Worker editor, Martin Abern as secretary, and Harry Gannes as business manager. In May 1922, the Young Communist League of America (YCLA) formed at an underground gathering, to which Max Bedacht spoke. The group published Young Communist quarterly during 1922. In July 1922, Carlson visited to comrades in Gary, Indiana.

In January 1924, Carlson, now ex-editor, gauged circulation of the Young Worker at 7-8,000 copies per issue. After attending the 4th world congress of the Young Communist International, leadership shuffled, with three secretaries (John Williamson, Martin Abern, and Carlson), Max Shachtman as editor, and Abern and Carlson as heads of the education department (among other positions).

=== Communist Summer Schools ===
In 1925, Carlson became head of Communist Summer Schools, sponsored by the Workers Party of America. During summer 1926, the Young Workers League of America (YWL) ran several pioneer camps and summer schools: Chicago, Waino, Wisconsin; Waukegan, Illinois, and Winchedon, Massachusetts. During Summer 1927, the YWL ran four schools in Boston, a town in Ohio, Waino, and Winlock, Washington. Carlson directed the Winlock school. During 1928, Carlson directed a YWL school in Woodland, Washington.

=== CLA ===
In 1928–29, Carlson joined the Communist League of America (CLA), headed by James P. Cannon, Max Shachtman, and Martin Abern. CLA members had been expelled from the Communist Party USA for Trotskyism as "Cannonites." He was one of the CLA "Musteites," other being Louis F. Budenz, Arnold Johnson, J.B.S. Hardman, and Benjamin Mandel. By late 1931, Carlson was out and seeking readmission to the CLA: he would not gain re-admittance. (In 1934, the CLA folded into A.J. Muste's American Workers Party to form the Workers Party of the United States.)

=== University of Chicago ===
In 1930, Carlson taught political science department at the University of Chicago, where "I made a special study of the propaganda techniques of the Communist movement both abroad and in this country."

During 1939–1940, he studied "the problem of Communism" in the state of California, which he published as A Mirror for Californians in 1941. According to Carlson in 1947, "has a good deal of information about the Communist movement in California, and in one chapter dealing with Hollywood I devote a part of that chapter to a discussion of the Communist infiltration in Hollywood up to that time." Carlson then read several pages from a chapter in the book called "There Is No Town Called Hollywood." (A May 1941 review in The New York Times reports that the book focuses on four main actors in California history: Denis Kearney, Hiram Johnson, Upton Sinclair, and Francis Townsend and also discusses Harry Bridges.)

== HUAC ==
As early as 1944, Carlson's name appears among others listed by the Legislature of the State California as "friendly witnesses". Others include Earl Warren.

On October 24, 1947, during hearings before the House Un-American Activities Committee, Carlson described himself as a writer and teacher, residing in Los Angeles. He told the committee, "I specialize in the field of political science, more particularly in the field of propaganda techniques. I have worked in that field for about 20 years or more." He testified that the Communist Party had sent people from New York to "run" Hollywood. He named V.J. Jerome and Eli Jacobson. He described Jacobson in detail: New Yorker, "charter member of the Communist Party," and associated in Los Angeles of film director Beryl La Cava and magazine editor Kyle Crichton. In the mid-1920s, Jacobson was a director of the New York Workers School, whose teachers included: Alexander Trachtenberg, William Z. Foster, Jack Stachel, and William W. Weinstone.

Regarding communism and teaching, Carlson testified that William Wolfe of the ILGWU education department ran a People's Education Center, succeeded by Sidney Davison (sent from New York). Herbert Biberman taught there (Soviet theater), as did Guy Endore Robert Lees. Advisors included Lees, Lawson, Healey, Herbert Sorrell, Frank Tuttle, and Sondra Gorney.

== Later life ==
In 1985, Carlson was living in Carlsbad, California.

== Personal life and death ==
Mrs. Oliver Carlson was a sponsor of the Hollywood League of Women Shoppers, along with Frances Farmer, Lillian Hellman, Mrs. Boris Karloff, and others.

Oliver Carlson died aged 91 on March 4, 1991, in California.

== Legacy ==
In addition to his works and congressional testimony, historian Harvey Klehr interviewed Carlson, available the Harvey Klehr Papers at Emory University.

== Works ==
Articles:

- "The Road Before Us: Keynote Speech at the First National Convention of the Young Workers League, Brooklyn, NY" (May 13, 1922)
- "Our First National Convention" (May 1922)
- "New Internationalism" (1922)
- "The Aims and Methods of Young Workers Education" (August 1927)
- "Recollections of American Trotskyist Leaders" (1977)

Pamphlets:

- Pamphlet series on Communism for Catholic Information Society (which also published Eugene Lyons, George S. Schuyler, William Henry Chamberlin, Richard Ginder, Hermann Borchhardt, Liston M. Oak, Aloysius Stepinac, Isaac Don Levine, Ralph de Toledano, Freda Utley, and Suzanne La Follette):
  - Red Star Over Hollywood (1947)
  - Radio in the Red (1947)
- Articles or pamphlets for Freeman:
  - What Really Happened in Pasadena? (1951
  - A Slanted Guide to Library Selections (January 14, 1952)

Books:

- Hearst: Lord of San Simeon with Ernest Sutherland Bates (1936)
- Brisbane: A Candid Biography (1937)
- A Mirror for Californians (1941)
- Man Who Made news, James Gordon Bennett (1942)
- How to Get into Politics; The Art of Winning Elections with Aldrich Blake (1946)
- Handbook on Propaganda for the Alert Citizen (1953)

== See also ==
- Martin Abern
- James P. Cannon
- Young Communist League of America
- Young Workers League

== External sources ==
- Getty images Oliver Carlson (undated)
- Inventory of the Communism: myth vs. reality motion picture film
- Early American Marxism - YPSL - Photo of Carlson (1919?)
