= Minneapolis general strike of 1934 =

1934 labor strike and protest in Minneapolis, Minnesota, United States

- Part of the Great Depression
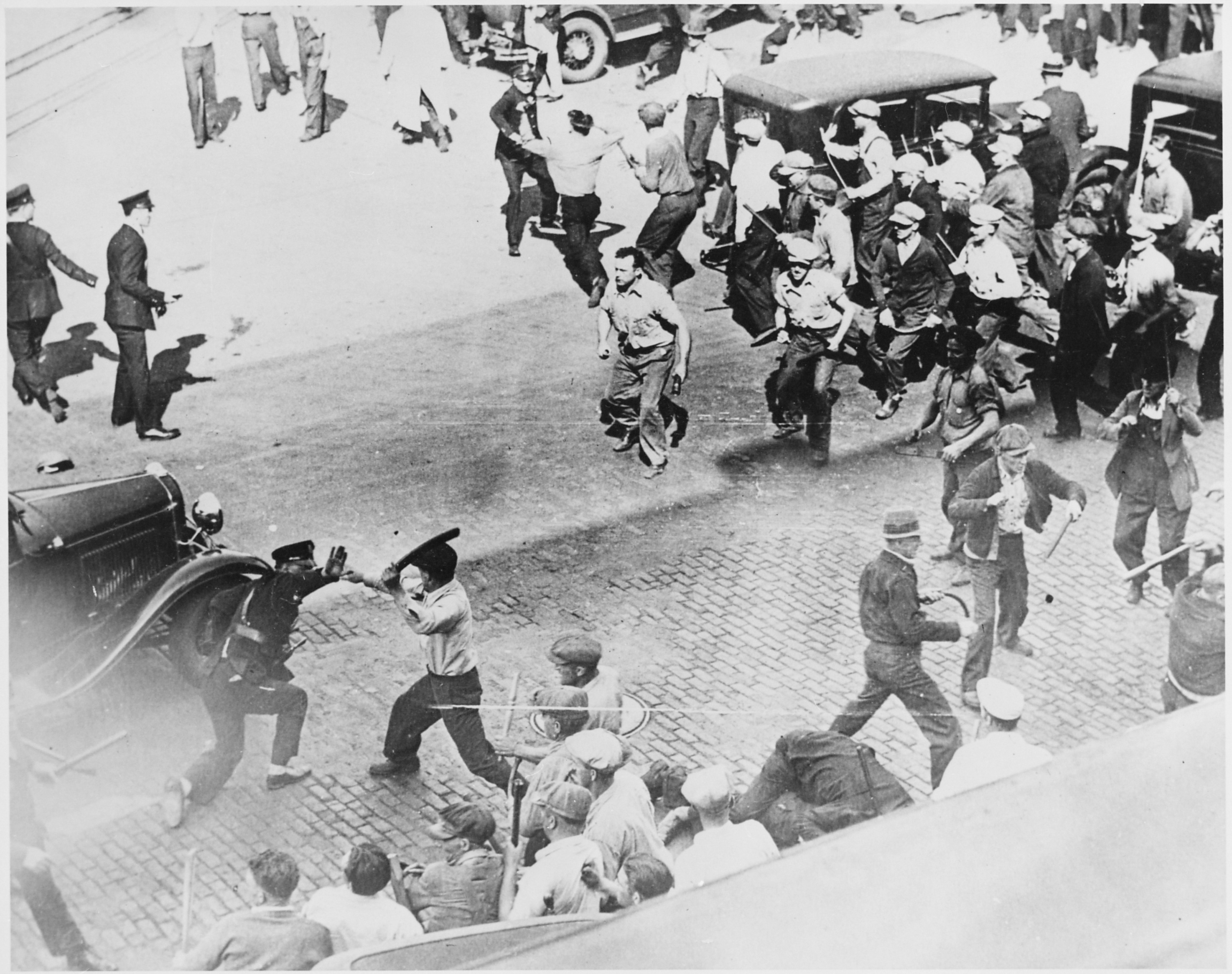
- Open battle between striking teamsters armed with pipes and the police in the streets of Minneapolis
- Date: May 16, 1934 - August 21, 1934
- Location: Minneapolis, Minnesota; 44°58′52″N 93°16′37″W
- Goals: Unionization
- Methods: Strikes, Protest, Demonstrations

Parties
International Brotherhood of Teamsters Communist League of America	Citizens' Alliance; Government of Minnesota: Minnesota Army National Guard; City of Minneapolis: Minneapolis Police Department

Lead figures
Daniel J. Tobin; Vincent R. Dunne; Carl Skoglund; Farrell Dobbs	Floyd B. Olson; Mike Johannes

Casualties and losses
Injuries: 67+; Fatalities: 2 strikers; Arrests: Many	Fatalities: 2 deputized civilians

The Minneapolis general strike of 1934 grew out of a strike by Teamsters against most of the trucking companies operating in Minneapolis, the major distribution center for the Upper Midwest. The strike began on May 16, 1934, in the Market District (the modern day Warehouse District). The worst single day was Friday, July 20, called "Bloody Friday", when police shot at strikers in a downtown truck battle, killing two and injuring 67. Ensuing violence lasted periodically throughout the summer. The strike was formally ended on August 22.

With a coalition formed by local leaders associated with the Trotskyist Communist League of America, a group that later founded the Socialist Workers Party (United States), the strike paved the way for the organization of over-the-road drivers and the growth of the Teamsters labor union. This strike, along with the 1934 West Coast Longshore Strike and the 1934 Toledo Auto-Lite Strike led by the American Workers Party, were also important catalysts for the rise of industrial unionism in the 1930s, much of which was organized through the Congress of Industrial Organizations.

== Background ==
Prior to the strike, in the early 1930s, Minneapolis was a non-union town, in part due to an "employer advocacy group" called the Citizens Alliance. The Alliance had power and sway over the Minneapolis economy and thwarted union organizing.

== Leadup to the strike ==
At the time of the strike, the governor of Minnesota was Floyd Olson, who belonged to the Farmer-Labor party. Olson was sympathetic to the union cause but also believed that he had gubernatorial responsibility to maintain law and order.

Large labor groups were more likely to maintain the status quo than to improve working conditions. The International Brotherhood of Teamsters (IBT), under the leadership of Daniel Tobin in 1933, was a conservative union averse to strikes. While the union's members were often called on to support other unions' strikes, the International Union itself was cautious and had resistance to any striking.

The provisions of the International Constitution (IC) required a two thirds vote of the membership to authorize any strike action. However, the same constitution gave the International President the power to withhold strike benefits if he believed that a local union had struck prematurely. The IC also divided its members into separate unions along craft or industry lines: ice wagon drivers in one local, produce drivers in another, milk drivers in a third, and so forth. The International Brotherhood of Teamsters was opposed to organizing broadly in the trucking sector.

The Teamsters had a number of general locals; Local 574 in Minneapolis, which had no more than 75 members in 1934, was one of them. A number of members, including several Communist Party members who had gone to the newly formed Communist League of America (Left Opposition) in the internal split following Trotsky's expulsion, became members of Local 574 in the early 1930s.

These members – Ray Dunne, his brothers Miles and Grant, Carl Skoglund and later Farrell Dobbs – began by organizing coal drivers through a strike in February 1934 that ignored both the cumbersome approval procedures established under the International's Constitution and the ineffective mediation procedures offered under the National Industrial Recovery Act. The victory gave the union a great deal of credibility among both drivers and their employers. The union began organizing drivers wherever they could be found, including truckers, helpers, and indoor workers like packers, creating a union of about 3,000 transportation workers.

The union also began preparing for the strike in a number of ways. It rented a large hall that could be used as a strike headquarters, kitchen and infirmary. It organized a women's auxiliary to staff the headquarters. Finally, it entered into discussions with the sympathetic leaders of organizations of farmers and the unemployed to obtain their support for the upcoming strike.

On April 30, 1934, the 574 presented demands for a closed shop, union recognition, shorter hours, and standard pay to the trucking firms. The trucking firms refused to negotiate with or recognize the union.

== The strike ==
The strike began on May 16, 1934. The strike was remarkably effective, shutting down most commercial transport in the city with the exception of certain farmers, who were allowed to bring their produce into town, but delivering directly to grocers, rather than to the market area, which the union had shut down.

On Saturday, May 19, 1934, Minneapolis Police and private guards beat a number of strikers trying to prevent strikebreakers from unloading a truck in the market area and waylaid several strikers who had responded to a report that scab drivers were unloading newsprint at the two major dailies' (newspapers) loading docks. Police followed injured strikers to the strikers headquarters. The strikers refused to let the police into the headquarters, leading to more violence between police and strikers.

Fighting intensified the following Monday, May 21, when the police, augmented by several hundred newly deputized members of the Citizens Alliance, an employer organization, attempted to open up the market for trucking. Fighting began when a loaded truck began leaving a loading dock. The battle became a general melee when hundreds of pickets armed with clubs of all sorts rushed to the area to support the picketers; when the police drew their guns as if to shoot, the union sent a truck loaded with picketers into the mass of police and deputies in order to make it impossible for them to fire without shooting each other.

Other unions, particularly in the building trades, began to strike in sympathy with the Teamsters. The American Federation of Labor's Central Labor Council in Minneapolis offered financial and moral support for the strike, allowing the union to coordinate some of its picketing activities from its headquarters.

The fighting resumed on Tuesday, May 22, known as the "Battle of Deputies' Run". The picketers took the offensive, beating and dispersing strikebreakers, and succeeded in driving both police and deputies from the market and the area around the union's headquarters. Of the several hundred deputized "special police", two (C. Arthur Lyman and Peter Erath) were cornered and killed. In the following "general riot" another roughly two dozen special police, municipal police, and strikers were beaten or wounded.

=== Negotiations ===
The Central Labor Council, the Building Trades Council and the Teamsters Joint Council approached Mike Johannes, the Minneapolis Chief of Police, to propose a truce, under which the local would cease picketing for twenty-four hours if the police and the employers ceased trying to move trucks. The employers, the Teamsters and the building trades signed a formal truce agreement. Johannes, however, declared that the police would move trucks once the truce expired, leading the union to announce that it was resuming picketing.

At this point city government appealed for Governor Floyd B. Olson to mobilize the National Guard, the 34th Infantry Division (United States) under Adjutant General Ellard A. Walsh. Olson did, but stopped short of actually deploying them, unwilling to alienate his labor supporters. Olson had already been attempting to mediate the dispute.

On May 25, the employers and the union reached an agreement on a contract that provided union recognition, reinstatement for all strikers, seniority and a no-discrimination clause. The membership approved it overwhelmingly.

On June 25, Local 574 launched its own newspaper daily, The Organizer, for the purposes of publicity and as agitprop.

=== Resumption of the strike ===
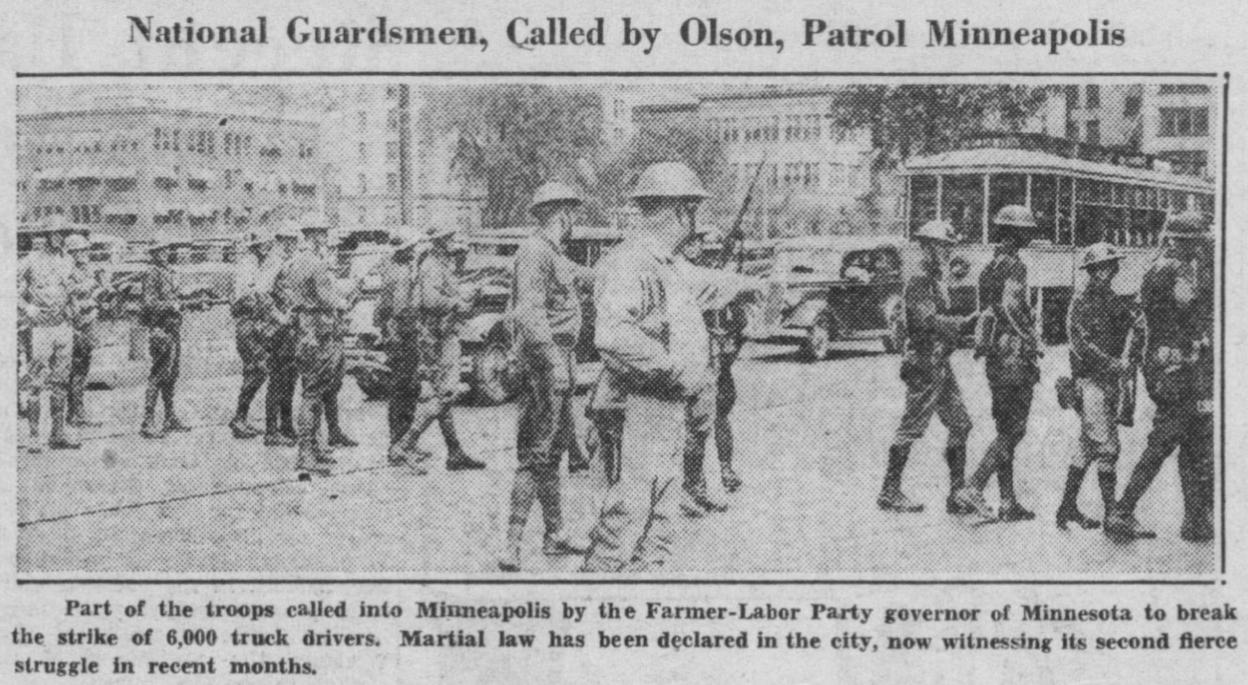
"National Guardsmen, Called by Olson, Patrol Minneapolis" Daily Worker, July 30, 1934

The union thought that it had the employers' agreement to include the "inside workers", the warehouse employees as well as the drivers and loaders. When the employers reneged on that agreement the strike resumed on Tuesday, July 17. Governor Olson again mobilized, but did not deploy, the National Guard.

The union's leadership had chosen to use different tactics in this strike; it ordered its members to picket without carrying any clubs or weapons of any sort. The police, on the other hand, armed themselves with riot guns which sprayed buckshot over a wide arc.

On Friday, July 20, a single yellow truck drove to the central market escorted by fifty armed policemen. The truck made the small delivery successfully, but a vehicle carrying picketers wielding clubs cut off the truck. The police opened fire on the vehicle with shotguns, then turned their guns on the strikers filling the surrounding streets. An eyewitness reported that as the pickets moved to aid their fallen comrades, "They flowed directly into buckshot fire ... And the cops let them have it as they picked up their wounded. Lines of living, solid men fell, broke, wavering." He also said he saw one man "stepping on his own intestines, bright and bursting in the street, and another holding his severed arm in his right hand."

Trotskyist The Militant comic, August 4, 1934

CPUSA's Daily Worker Comic, August 3, 1934

Two political comics from the opposing factions within the US communist movement, criticizing the deployment of the National Guard by Gov. Olson.

By the end of hostilities, two strikers (Henry Ness and John Belor) were dead and sixty-seven wounded. The death of Henry Ness became a way to show support for the strike. Ness was a World War I veteran who served as a "Wagoner" with the 311th Engineers U.S. Army 86th Division. He was shot twice, once while standing up and once on the ground. Reports vary from 40,000 to 100,000 people who attended his funeral.

The police violence sparked a show of support from other unions and a one-day strike of transport workers. Each side stepped back from the confrontation: Chief Johannes and Mayor Bainbridge faced calls for their impeachment, while the union continued to urge its members not to give the police any justification for further attacks, disarming a number of picketers who wanted to return fire with fire. The union did not make any overt efforts to stop later trucks accompanied by convoys of up to forty police cars that tried to deliver goods, but sent so many cars with pickets to accompany those convoys that the police were never able to shepherd more than a few delivery trucks on any given day.

On July 25, mediators Francis J. Haas and E.H. Dunnigan issued a proposal that listed minimum wage rates and clearly defined insider workers; it also reaffirmed union recognition. Local 574 accepted the deal but the firms—many of them now represented by the Employers’ Advisory Committee or EAC—rejected it.

== Martial law and settlement ==
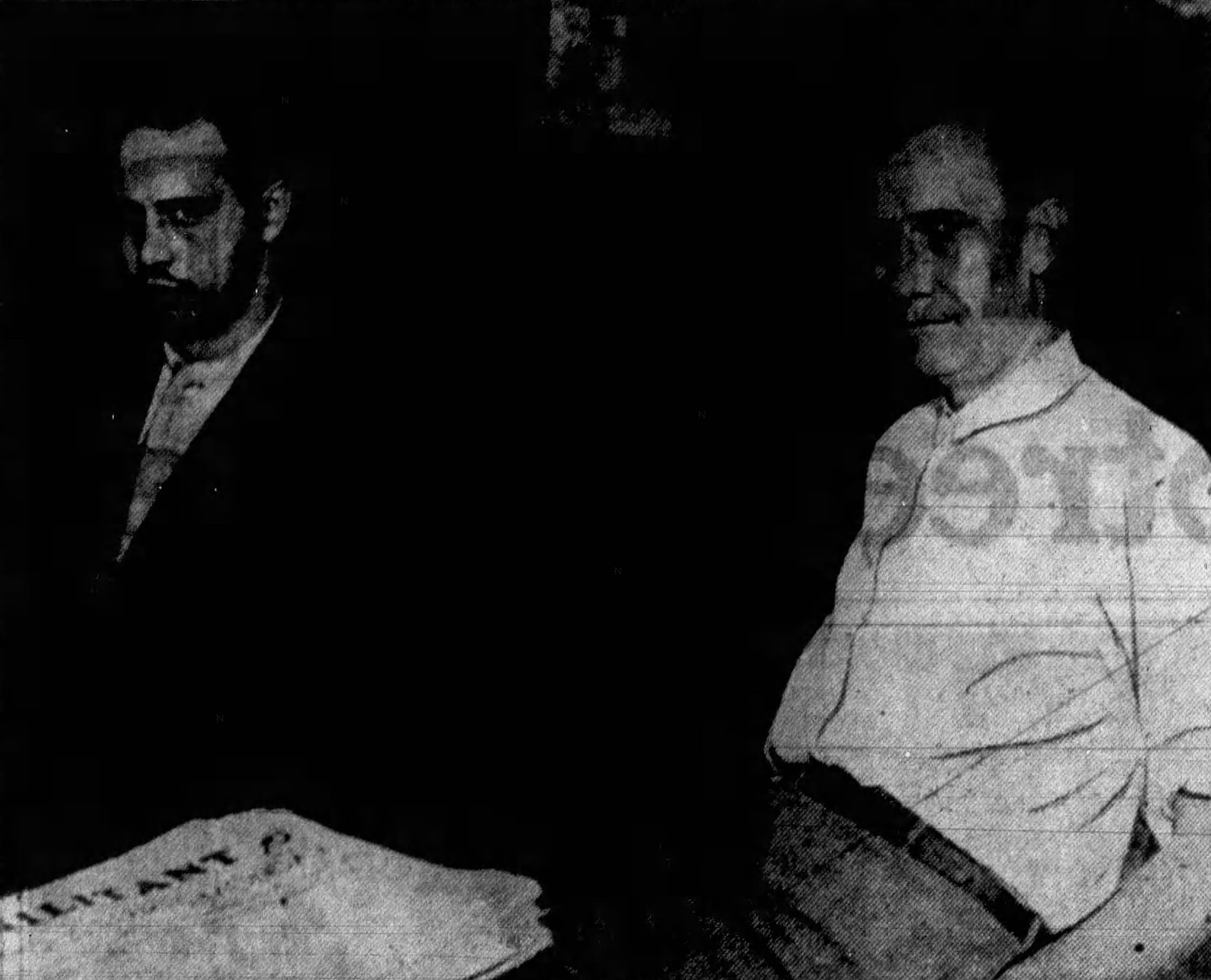
Trotskyist leaders Max Shachtman (left) and James P. Cannon following their arrest, July 27, 1934

A public commission, set up later by the governor, reported:

Police took direct aim at the pickets and fired to kill. Physical safety of the police was at no time endangered. No weapons were in possession of the pickets.

On July 26, after the violence which led to the deaths of two protesters, Farmer-Labor governor Olson declared martial law and mobilized four thousand National Guardsmen of the 34th Infantry. He banned picketing and offered permits only to trucks delivering essentials.

Between July 26 and August 1, the National Guard began issuing operating permits to truck drivers, and engaging in roving patrols, curfews, and security details. On August 1, National Guard troops seized strike headquarters and placed arrested union leaders in a stockade at the state fairgrounds in Saint Paul. The next day, the headquarters were restored to the union and the leaders released from the stockade, as the National Guard carried out a token raid on the Citizens Alliance headquarters.

The union appealed to the Central Labor Union for a general strike and the governor issued an ultimatum that he would stop all trucks by midnight, August 5, if there was no settlement. Nevertheless, by August 14, there were thousands of trucks operating under military permits, as Olson allowed only firms that had signed the mediator's proposal to get the permits. Although the strike was gravely weakened by martial law and economic pressure, union leaders made it clear that it would continue.

On August 21, a federal mediator got acceptance of a settlement proposal from A. W. Strong, head of the Citizens Alliance, incorporating the union's major demands. The settlement was ratified, breaking the back of employer resistance to unionization in Minneapolis.

== Impact and legacy ==
The strike changed Minneapolis, which had been an open shop citadel under the control of the Citizens Alliance for years before 1934. In the aftermath of this strike thousands of other workers in other industries organized with the assistance of Local 574.

The strike paved the way for militancy in the larger American labor movement. This strike, along with the 1934 West Coast Longshore Strike and the 1934 Toledo Auto-Lite Strike led by the American Workers Party, were also important catalysts for the rise of industrial unionism in the 1930s, much of which was organized through the Congress of Industrial Organizations. These efforts led to the establishment of the National Labor Relations Act.

The strike also gave the Communist League, later renamed the Workers Party of America, a strong position in Local 574, and in other Teamster locals within the metropolitan area of Minneapolis. Trotskyist strength grew to over 100 members. This gave leadership to the Trotskyists through the various unions they led within the Central Labor Council. As mentioned below, through organizing the first area-wide contract for any union outside of rail, the Trotskyists established locals of their party wherever there were Teamster locals, from South Dakota to Iowa to Colorado. The party was later driven out of that local by prosecutions under the Smith Act and a trusteeship imposed by Tobin in the early 1940s.

In March 1935, International president Daniel Tobin expelled Local 574 from the International Brotherhood of Teamsters (IBT). However, in August 1936, Tobin was forced to relent and recharter the local as 544. The leaders of 544 went on to develop the conference bargaining that exists today in the IBT.

Local 544 remained under socialist leadership until 1941, when eighteen leaders of the union and the Socialist Workers Party were sentenced to federal prison. They were the first victims of the anti-radical Smith Act, a law the United States Supreme Court eventually found to be unconstitutional. The members sentenced to prison included James P. Cannon, Grace Carlson, Jake Cooper, Oscar Coover, Harry DeBoer, Farrell Dobbs, V.R. Dunne, Max Geldman, Albert Goldman, Clarence Hamel, Emil Hansen, Carlos Hudson (father of Michael Hudson), Karl Kuehn, Felix Morrow, Edward Palmquist, Alfred Russel, Oscar Schoenfeld, Carl Skoglund.

More importantly, the strike launched the career of Farrell Dobbs, who played a significant role in the organization of over-the-road drivers throughout the Midwest. Those efforts led in turn to the transformation of the Teamsters from a craft union, made up of locals with a parochial focus on their own craft and locality, into a truly national union.

The organization Remember 1934 hosts an annual celebration to honor the strike. In 2024, the celebration included the grandchildren of Henry Ness and involved local art exhibitions. In 1940, the Aquatennial was established and took place on the same day as the remembrance of the strikers.

== See also ==
- Union violence in the United States
- 1938 New York City truckers strike
- 34th Infantry Division (United States)
- Ellard A. Walsh
- Floyd B. Olson
- History of Minneapolis
- Murder of workers in labor disputes in the United States

== External sources ==
- 1934 Minneapolis Teamster Strikes Archive at marxists.org
- The Organizer Archive at marxists.org
- Trotskyist Work in the Trade Unions, by Chris Knox
- 75th anniversary of the Minneapolis truck drivers’ strike, by Ron Jorgenson
- Primary source set on the Teamsters Strike of 1934 from the Minnesota Digital Library
