= Joseph Carter (socialist) =

American socialist (1910–1970)

Joseph Carter (1910–1970) was the pseudonym of Joseph Friedman, a founding member of the American Trotskyist movement.

Friedman was expelled from the Young Communist League, the youth wing of the Communist Party of America, in 1929 for his Trotskyist sympathies. He became a charter member of the Trotskyist Communist League of America and with Emanuel Geltman and Albert Glotzer created Young Spartacus, the youth newspaper of the Communist league. Friedman was the original editor of Labor Action, the official organ of the Workers Party, the organization established by James Burnham, Max Shachtman, and Martin Abern in April 1940 following their departure from the Socialist Workers Party. He was one of the originators of the theory of bureaucratic collectivism. He dropped out of political activity after World War II.
