= Communist League of America =

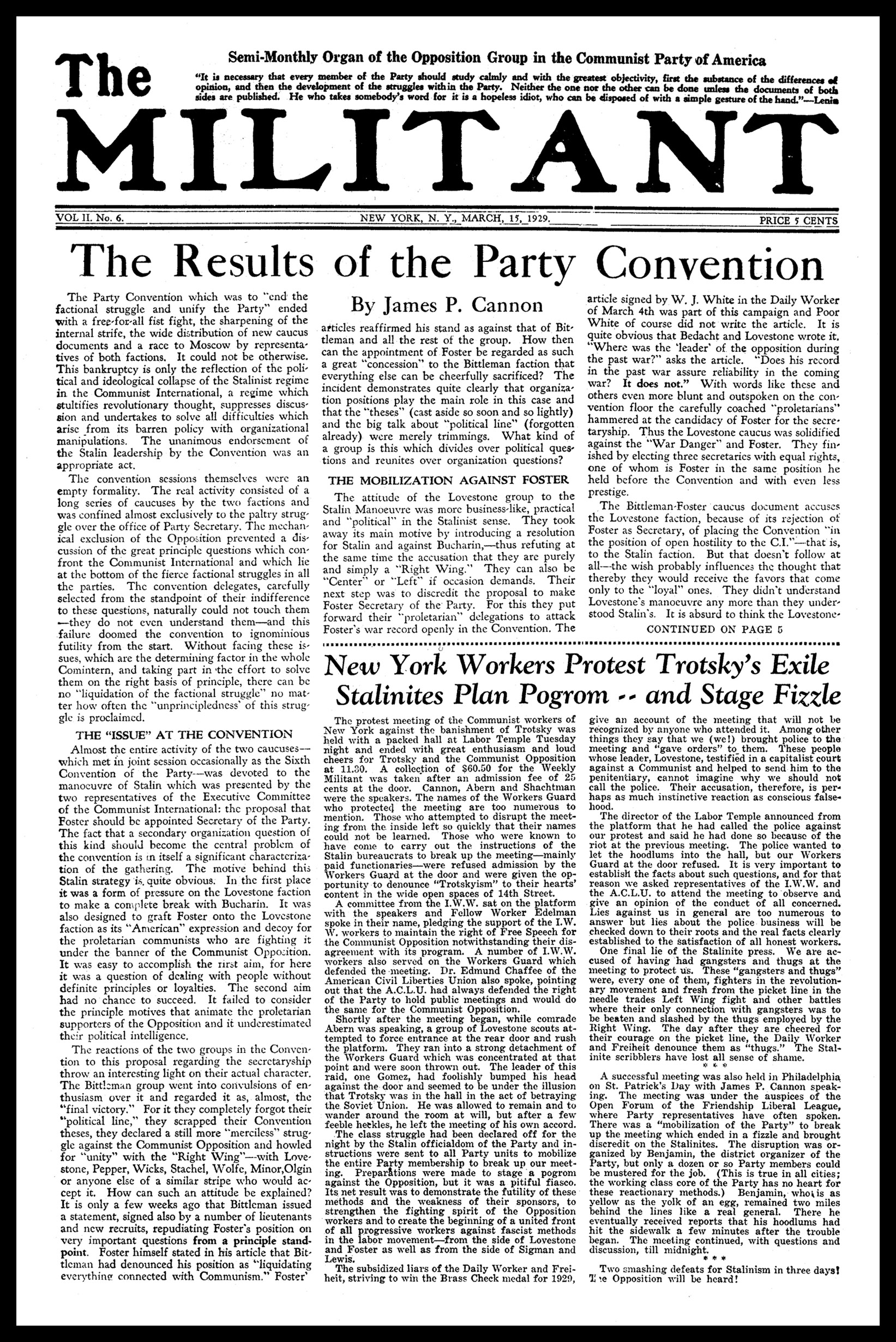
- The Militant, edited by James P. Cannon, Martin, Abern, and Max Shachtman, was the official organ of the Communist League of America throughout its six years of existence.
- Leader: James P. Cannon
- Founders: James P. Cannon; Max Shachtman; Martin Abern
- Founded: October 1928
- Dissolved: December 1934
- Split from: Communist Party USA
- Merged into: Workers Party of the United States
- Newspaper: The Militant
- Membership (1932): 429
- Ideology: Communism; Trotskyism
- Political position: Far-left
- International affiliation: International Left Opposition

The Communist League of America (Opposition) was founded by James P. Cannon, Max Shachtman and Martin Abern late in 1928 after their expulsion from the Communist Party USA for Trotskyism. The CLA(O) was the United States section of Leon Trotsky's International Left Opposition and initially positioned itself as not a rival party to the CPUSA but as a faction of it and the Comintern. The group was terminated in 1934 when it merged with the American Workers Party headed by A. J. Muste to establish the Workers Party of the United States.

== Organizational history ==
=== Introduction to Trotskyist ideas ===
On October 27, 1928, three leading members of the Workers (Communist) Party of America were expelled from the organization for the transgression of "Trotskyism." The trio — Communist Labor Party founder James P. Cannon, Labor Defender editor Max Shachtman, and Romanian-born former head of the Young Workers League Martin Abern — had been won over to the ideas of Leon Trotsky when Cannon had been exposed to a translation of Trotsky's manuscript "The Draft Program of the Communist International: A Criticism of Fundamentals" while a delegate to the Sixth World Congress of the Comintern in Moscow that summer.

Cannon later recalled:

"Through some slip-up in the apparatus in Moscow, which was supposed to be bureaucratically airtight, this document of Trotsky came into the translating room of the Comintern. It fell into the hopper, where they had a dozen or more translators and stenographers with nothing else to do. They picked up Trotsky's document, translated it and distributed it to the heads of the delegations and the members of the program commission. So, lo and behold, it was laid in my lap, translated into English by Maurice Spector, a delegate from the Canadian Party, and in somewhat the same frame of mind as myself, was also on the program commission and he got a copy. We let the caucus meetings and the Congress sessions go to the devil while we read and studied this document. Then I knew what I had to do and so did he. Our doubts had been resolved... We made a compact there and then — Spector and I — that we would come back home and begin a struggle under the banner of Trotskyism."

Cannon and the rest of the Comintern delegation returned to America in September 1928. The factional war between the dominant group headed by party Executive Secretary Jay Lovestone and the Chicago-based chief of the Trade Union Educational League, William Z. Foster was temporarily put on ice so that the party could conduct a Presidential campaign. Meanwhile, Cannon and his small circle of close associates set to work at another task, personally evangelizing to "carefully selected individuals" by reading to them from the single copy of the Trotsky document that they had at their disposal.

After about a month word leaked about the dissident gospel being propagated by Cannon and his co-thinkers — Rose Karsner (Cannon's wife), Max Shachtman, and Marty Abern. The subject was broached at a formal meeting of the Foster-Cannon factional caucus, with the Foster loyalists demanding an explanation. Cannon refused to provide a frank and full disclosure of his new-found ideological views, electing instead to "bluff" Foster and his associates for another week in order to win more time for the winning of converts to the cause.

The Foster group became increasingly aware of the heresy in their midst and quickly called another factional meeting, however. At this session Foster associate Clarence Hathaway, newly returned from a stint at the Comintern's Lenin School in Moscow, demanded passage of a formal resolution condemning Trotskyism as "counter-revolutionary" in the name of the joint Foster-Cannon caucus. A heated debate erupted, lasting four or five hours, at the end of which time Cannon managed to win another two weeks by hinting that he might end his uphill fight on behalf of Trotsky, who was by this juncture thoroughly marginalized in Russian politics.

Ultimately, however, the Foster group was forced to blow the whistle that Cannon, Shachtman, and Abern were attempting to convert party members to Trotskyism, lest they too be tainted as silent accomplices if the Lovestone faction should discover the heresy on their own. The Cannon group was expelled from the joint caucus with the Fosterites and charges were preferred against Cannon, Shachtman, and Abern before a joint session of the Political Committee and the disciplinary Central Control Committee. A mimeographed statement was circulated by the Cannon group in defense of their position, the inevitable expulsions were made, and a split was at hand. Cannon, Abern, and Shachtman were also expelled from the mass organization of the Communist Party which Cannon had previously headed, the International Labor Defense (ILD).

Just one week after the October 27, 1928, expulsion of Cannon, Shachtman, and Abern from the Communist Party the first issue of a new newspaper called The Militant rolled off the presses. The Communist League of America was born in earnest.

=== Birth of an organization ===
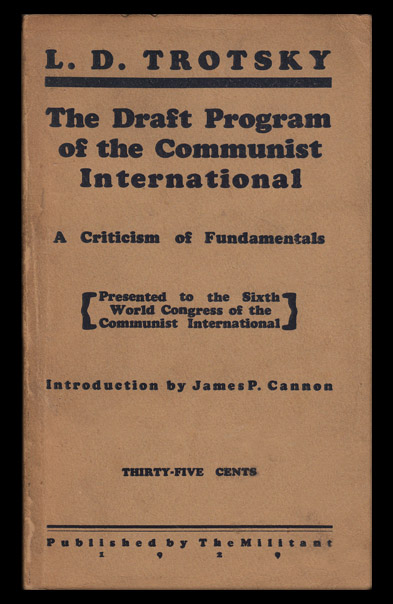
The Communist League of America published more than a dozen books and pamphlets by Leon Trotsky during its six years of existence.

Cannon, Shachtman, and Abern initially conceived of their task as that of reforming rather than replacing the Communist Party. Historian Constance Myers has explained their thinking in this manner:

"Since Trotsky was right, one day he would be redeemed and recalled to the Communist Party of the Soviet Union and the Comintern; subsequently the party would reinstate his followers in their rightful, leadership roles. Moreover, the comrades still in the party (in the Trotskyists' eyes) remained comrades with different opinions."

Max Shachtman made arrangements with a sympathetic New York printer he knew that was a former member of the Industrial Workers of the World to produce a newspaper in his small shop extending credit to the expelled dissidents. Funding began to become available, with Max Eastman, a translator of Trotsky that had recently produced a book called The Real Situation in Russia chipping in the $200 the job had paid him, and additional funds coming from Hungarian communists led by Louis Basky, an expelled group of Italian supporters of Amadeo Bordiga in New York, and a Boston group headed by left-wing veteran Antoinette Konikow.

On November 15, 1928, the first issue of a new tabloid newspaper for the fledgling supporters saw light, The Militant — a paper tellingly subtitled "Semi-Monthly Organ of the Opposition Group in the Workers (Communist) Party of America." The paper was aimed directly at members of the Communist Party, whom the expelled Trotskyists considered a vanguard organization that would be most interested in their ideas.

Those choosing to remain regular to the Workers (Communist) Party of America saw matters through different eyes. Over the next six weeks a series of about 60 expulsions of party members for their support of Cannon and the Trotskyist movement, including key activists Arne Swabeck and Albert Glotzer in Chicago, Ray Dunne in Minneapolis, and others in Kansas City, Philadelphia, and Cleveland. The Communist Party of Canada acted similarly in expelling Maurice Spector, who became a participant-by-correspondence in the fledgling American organization. This action paralleled even more severe reprisals in the Soviet Union, in which as many as 300 of Trotsky's former aides and political associates were arrested by the Soviet secret police. It was at this time that the Bolshevik-Leninist Opposition was completely smashed in an organizational sense in the Soviet Union, in the estimation of CLA leader Jim Cannon.

The "Three Generals Without an Army" of the new CLA — Cannon, Shachtman, and Abern — began conducting personal correspondence potential supporters. Cannon later recalled the situation which they faced:

"In the past we, and especially I, had been accustomed to speaking to fairly large audiences... Now we had to speak to individuals. Our propagandistic work consisted mainly of finding out names of isolated individuals in the Communist Party, or close to the party, who might be interested, arranging an interview, spending hours and hours talking to a single individual, writing long letters explaining all our principled positions in an attempt to win over one person. And in this way we recruited people — not by tens, not by hundreds, but one by one."

=== Physical violence ===
The schism of Cannon and his co-thinkers was the cause of organized illegal or unethical activity by the Workers (Communist) Party. Cannon's apartment was ransacked late in December 1928 by politically minded "burglars" who sought his correspondence files and subscription lists. According to a 1940 tell-all book by Benjamin Gitlow, the Communist Party's assistant organizational secretary Jack Stachel and the business manager of the Daily Worker, a man named Ravitch, were responsible for the Cannon burglary. Documents were transported to Stachel's New York City apartment, where they were examined by top party leaders Jay Lovestone and John Pepper, according to Gitlow. Some of this stolen material was later published in the Daily Worker as part of an organized campaign against the Trotskyist dissidents.

Early public meetings under the auspices of the CLA were threatened or broken up by organized groups of supporters of the regular Communist Party. A first lecture held in New York City on the topic "The Truth About Trotsky and the Russian Opposition" held on the evening of January 8, 1929, proceeded without obstruction. Subsequent Cannon lectures in New Haven and Boston met with organized disruption, however, with the New Haven gathering broken up and dispersed by Communist Party loyalists.

A 1929 Boston meeting was completed thanks only to the posting of a security team of about 10 former Industrial Workers of the World associates of Cannon around the podium — a sufficient show of force to deter disruption. A meeting in Cleveland ended in a fifteen-minute riot with Communist Party supporters being physically expelled, in Chicago the situation did not degenerate to the level of physical confrontation. In Minneapolis a riot ensued which was broken up by the police, with the meeting disbursed. Other meetings were disrupted in Los Angeles and Salt Lake City.

In response to the physical tactics of the regular Communist Party Trotskyists formed a "Workers Defense Guard" equipped with clubs and wooden axe handles and maintained security at subsequent public meetings in Minneapolis (a hotbed of the organization) and New York. An assault on a Trotskyist meeting held on May Day 1929 was repelled by "Workers Defense Guard" members wielding clubs at the top of a stairway; a retaliatory attack on a business meeting of the Hungarian CLA branch shortly thereafter precipitated into a riot during which one of the interlopers was nearly stabbed to death by a Trotskyist woodworker. The negative publicity and escalation of force surrounding this event ended the first spate of organized violence by the Communist Party against the fledgling CLA.

=== Organizational difficulties ===
The Communist League of America was never a large organization at any stage of its existence. At the time of the 1st National Conference of the organization, held in Chicago in May 1929, the group consisted of only about 100 members. The total membership of the CLA reported at the time of the group's second conference in 1931 was 156, of whom just 24 dated their membership back to the 1928 origins of the organization.

The organization showed growth in 1932, hitting a membership of 429, but it stagnated at approximately this level. At the time of the group's dissolution through merger with the American Workers Party in 1934, it still contained fewer than 500 members, according to party leader Max Shachtman.

While the CLA did manage to attract some disaffected members of the regular CPUSA, most newcomers to the organization were previously unaffiliated young radicals. Many of those coming from the Communist Party were often difficult for the centralized organization to manage, retrospectively regarded by Cannon as "dilettantish petty-bourgeois minded people who couldn't stand any kind of discipline" who "wanted, or rather thought they wanted to become Trotskyists."

Cannon later recalled:

Many of the newcomers made a fetish of democracy. They were repelled so much by the bureaucratism of the Communist Party that they desired an organization without any authority or discipline or centralization whatever.

All the people of this type have one common characteristic: they like to discuss things without limit or end.... They can all talk; and not only can, but will; and everlastingly, on every question. They were iconoclasts who would accept nothing as authoritative, nothing as decided in the history of the movement. Everything and everybody had to be proved over again from scratch."

As by-product of the group's small size, its quarrelsome and iconoclastic membership, and its isolation from the broader labor movement, a culture of fierce internal squabbling reigned supreme. Eyes were turned inward upon other members of the group itself rather than political activities matters of concern in the broader world, as party members frequently fought over trifles.

In addition to the disorganization sowed by persistent sectarian squabbling, growth of the CLA was further hindered by its financial poverty. Party leader Jim Cannon summed the matter up in this manner:

"We were trying to publish a newspaper, we were trying to publish a whole list of pamphlets, without the necessary resources. Every penny we obtained was immediately devoured by the expenses of the newspaper. We didn't have a nickel to turn around with. These were the days of real pressure, the hard days of isolation, of poverty, of disheartening internal difficulties. This lasted not for weeks or months, but for years."

=== Union activity ===
Local leaders associated with the Communist League of America led the Minneapolis Teamsters Strike of 1934. The strike paved the way for the organization of over-the-road drivers and the growth of the Teamsters union. It, along with the 1934 West Coast Longshore Strike (led by the Communist Party USA) and the 1934 Toledo Auto-Lite Strike led by the American Workers Party, were important catalysts for the rise of industrial unionism in the 1930s, much of which was organized through the Congress of Industrial Organizations.

=== Dissolution ===
In December 1934, the CLA merged with A. J. Muste's American Workers Party to form the Workers Party of the United States. A new newspaper, much like the old one, was established with Jim Cannon at the editorial helm, given the less than original name New Militant. A new phase of the American Trotskyist movement was begun.

== Prominent members ==
- Martin Abern
- Oliver Carlson
- James P. Cannon
- Joseph Carter
- Bert Cochran
- Oscar Coover
- Charles Curtiss
- Farrell Dobbs
- Raya Dunayevskaya
- Grant Dunne
- Miles "Mickey" Dunne
- Vincent R. "Ray" Dunne
- Albert Glotzer
- Albert Goldman
- Joseph Hansen
- Reba Hansen
- Rose Karsner
- Antoinette Konikow
- A. C. Miller
- Felix Morrow
- George Novack
- Hugo Oehler
- T.J. O'Flaherty
- Max Shachtman
- Carl Skoglund
- Maurice Spector
- Arne Swabeck
- Joseph Vanzler (AKA "John G. Wright")

== National gatherings ==
Event	Location	Date	Notes
1st National Conference	Chicago	May 17–19, 1929	31 regular delegates, 17 alternates with voice but no vote.
2nd National Conference	New York City	Sept. 24–27, 1931	New organizational constitution adopted.
3rd National Convention	New York City	Nov. 28–30, 1934	Joint meeting with American Workers Party; 43 regular CLA delegates.

== Publications ==
=== Newspapers ===
- The Militant, (November 15, 1928 – December 8, 1934). Martin Abern, James P. Cannon, Max Shachtman, Maurice Spector, editors. New York.
  - Volume 1: Nov. 15, 1928 – Dec. 15, 1928.
  - Volume 2: Jan. 1, 1929 – Dec. 28, 1929.
  - Volume 3: Jan. 4, 1930 – Dec. 1, 1930.
  - Volume 4: Jan. 1, 1931 – Dec. 26, 1931.
  - Volume 5: Jan. 2, 1932 – Dec. 31, 1932.
  - Volume 6: Jan. 7, 1933 – Dec. 30, 1933.
  - Volume 7: Jan. 4, 1934 – Dec. 8, 1934.
- Communistes, (1931). —Greek language organ of the CLA.
- Unzer Kamf, (1932–1933). —Yiddish-language organ of the CLA.
- New International (established July 1934). —Theoretical magazine.
- Young Spartacus, (December 1931 – December 1935). —Organ of the CLA National Youth Committee.

=== Books and pamphlets ===
- Leon Trotsky, The Draft Program of the Communist International: A Criticism of Fundamentals: Presented to the Sixth World Congress of the Communist International. New York: The Militant, 1929.
- Leon Trotsky, Problems of the development of the U.S.S.R.; draft of the thesis of the International left opposition on the Russian question Communist League of America 1931
- Leon Trotsky, Max Shachtman trans. and intro. The strategy of the world revolution New York, Communist League of America 1930
- Leon Trotsky, Max Shachtman trans. Communism and syndicalism; on the trade-union question New York, Communist League of America 1931
- Leon Trotsky, The Permanent Revolution. Max Shachtman, trans. New York: Pioneer Publishers, 1931.
- Leon Trotsky, The Revolution in Spain. New York: Communist League of America (Opposition), 1931.
- Leon Trotsky, The Spanish Revolution in Danger! New York: Pioneer Publishers, 1931.
- World Unemployment and the Five Year Plan. New York: Communist League of America (Opposition), 1931.
- Leon Trotsky, Germany: The Key to the International Situation. New York: Pioneer Publishers, 1932.
- Leon Trotsky, Problems of the Chinese Revolution. New York: Pioneer Publishers, 1932.
- Leon Trotsky, What Next? Vital Questions for the German Proletariat. Joseph Vanzler, trans. New York: Pioneer Publishers, 1932.
- Hugo Oehler, America's Role in Germany. Philadelphia: Communist League of America (Opposition), 1933.
- Max Shachtman, Ten Years: History and Principles of the Left Opposition. New York: Pioneer Publishers, 1933.
- Leon Trotsky, In Defense of the Russian Revolution: Speech Delivered at Copenhagen, December 1932. New York: Pioneer Publishers, 1933.
- Leon Trotsky, Soviet Economy in Danger: The Expulsion of Zinoviev. New York: Pioneer Publishers, 1933.
- Leon Trotsky, The Soviet Union and the Fourth International: The Class Nature of the Soviet State. New York: Pioneer Publishers, 1934.
- Leon Trotsky, War and the 4th International: Draft Theses Adopted by the International Secretariat of the International Communist League. New York: Communist League of America, 1934.

== See also ==
- Workers Party of the United States
