= Skogie =

Skogie is the nickname of:

- Carl Skoglund (1884—1960), Swedish-American socialist and political figure
- Freddy Moore (born 1950), American rock musician, husband of Demi Moore
