= Olga Rodriguez =

Olga Rodriguez may refer to:

- Olga Rodriguez (activist), Chicano activist and member of the Socialist Workers Party of the United States
- Olga Rodríguez (journalist), Spanish journalist and author
- Olga María Rodríguez Fariñas, Cuban revolutionary
