= Jake Cooper (socialist) =

American politician (1916–1990)

Jake Cooper (1916–1990) was an American Socialist. He was active in the Minneapolis Teamsters Strike of 1934 led by the Communist League of America and later became a member of the Socialist Workers Party. As a leading member of the SWP, he was imprisoned under the Smith Act, together with many other SWP leaders, for opposing US involvement in the Second World War., receiving a 16-month sentence. Cooper was also a founding member of the Fourth International.

In 1940, Jake Cooper was selected by the Socialist Workers Party to go to Mexico City and work as a bodyguard for Leon Trotsky, the exiled Russian Bolshevik leader. "I'm honored by the fact that I was selected because perhaps it tells you that they thought I was not only a militant, but that I was honest and would go there to die for our ideas if necessary," Cooper said in an interview in 1988.

Cooper remained a Trotskyist his entire life. When the Socialist Workers Party leadership faction of Jack Barnes abandoned Trotskyism in the 1980s and expelled the Trotskyist factions, he joined those who were expelled in the group called Socialist Action (US). As a member of Socialist Action Cooper was, among other things, very active in supporting the UFCW Local P-9 strike of meat packing workers against Hormel Foods in Austin, Minnesota during the 1985–86 Hormel strike, serving as the chairperson of the Metro P-9 Strike Support Committee. As a supporter of the strike he actively gathered large amounts of food for the workers and advocated the kinds of militant tactics that he was part of in the Minneapolis Teamsters Strike of 1934.

== Sources ==
- On the 65th anniversary of the death of Leon Trotsky, a 1988 reminiscence from Jake Cooper
- Cooper, Jake (1988). Lessons of the P-9 Strike. Socialist Action Books. 298 Valencia St., San Francisco CA 94103.
- Cooper, Jake (6 July 2012). "Why Corporate Campaign’s Tactics Can’t Win Strikes".
