= Harry DeBoer =

American Marxist labor organizer

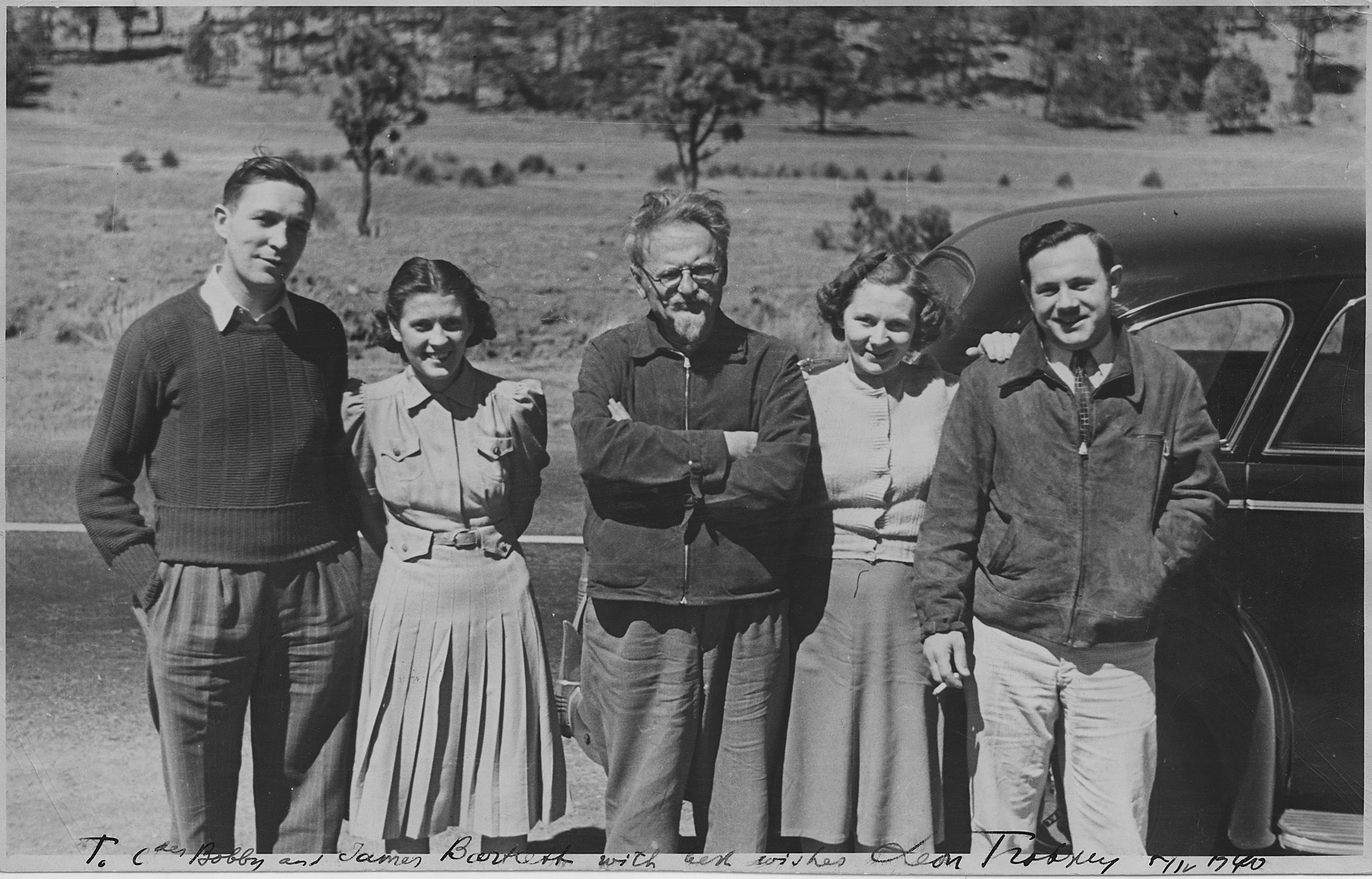
Leon Trotsky with Harry De Boer (left) and James H. Bartlett and their spouses in Mexico in 1940.

Harry DeBoer (1903–1992) was an American labor organizer and Trotskyist. He was born in Crookston, Minnesota, and worked in the Minneapolis coal yards. DeBoer became one of the leaders of the Minneapolis Teamsters Strike of 1934 – a particularly well-organized action that resulted in the shutting down of most commercial transport in the city. A leading member of the Socialist Workers Party, DeBoer was prosecuted together with many other SWP leaders under the Smith Act for opposing the US involvement in World War II. He found guilty and sentenced to one year in prison. In 1987, DeBoer authored the essay "How to Win Strikes: Lessons from the 1934 Minneapolis Truckers Strike" (also translated into Danish and German), in which he sought to disseminate the tactics used in the Minneapolis strike for the benefit of a new generation of socialists.

In his later years, DeBoer was a member of the Committee for a Workers' International before the 1992 split.
