= Farrell Dobbs =

American politician (1907–1983)

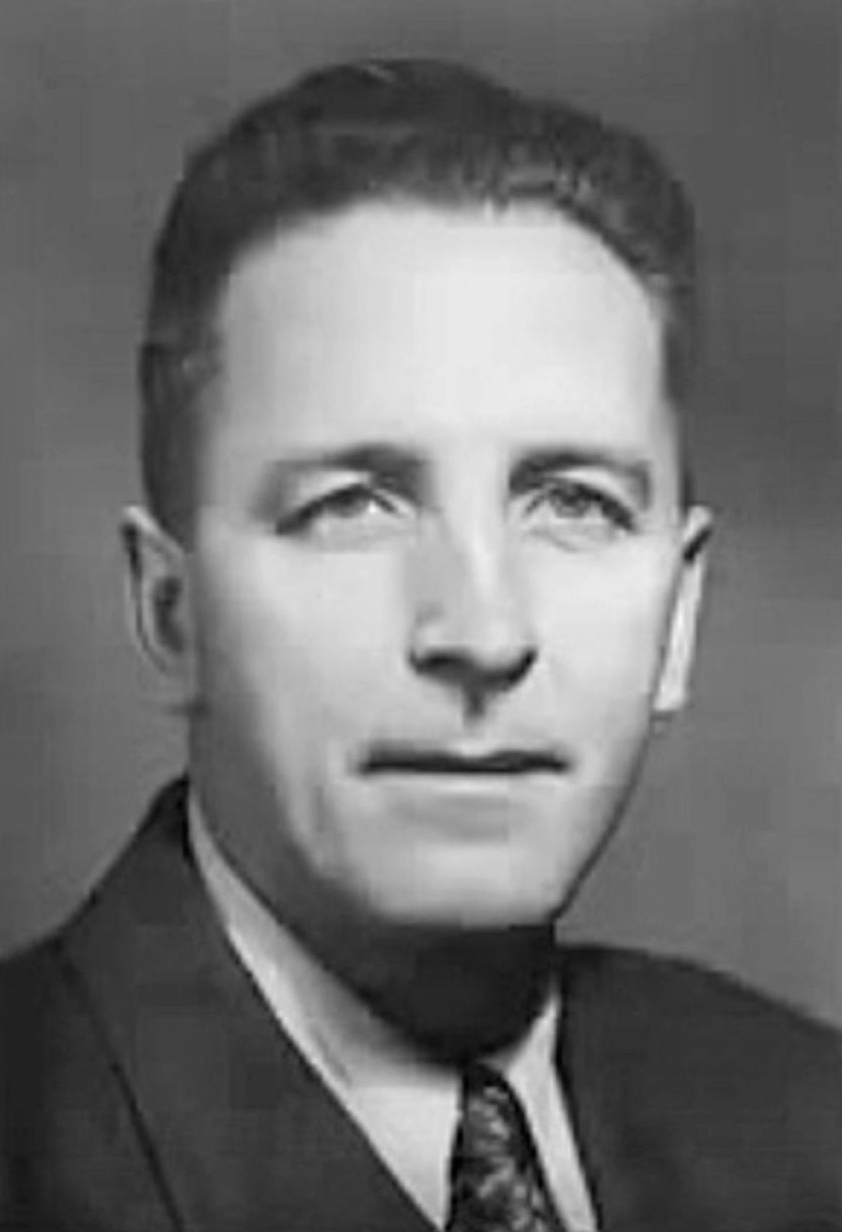
- Dobbs c. 1948

National Secretary of the Socialist Workers Party
- In office 1953–1972
- Preceded by: James P. Cannon
- Succeeded by: Jack Barnes

Personal details
- Born: July 25, 1907 Queen City, Missouri
- Died: October 31, 1983 (aged 76) Pinole, California
- Spouse: Marvel Scholl
- Children: Carol E. DeBerry, Mary Lou Montauk, Sharon Lee Finer
- Parent(s): Isaac Turl Dobbs, Ora Lenore Smith
- Occupation: Politician, trade unionist, historian

Farrell Dobbs (July 25, 1907 – October 31, 1983) was an American Trotskyist, trade unionist, politician, and historian.

== Early years ==
Dobbs was born in Queen City, Missouri, where his father was a worker in a coal company garage. The family moved to Minneapolis, and he graduated from North High School in 1925. In 1926, he left for North Dakota to find work, but returned the following fall. At this point, young Farrell Dobbs was a Republican, and supported Herbert Hoover for president in 1928 and 1932.

== Politics ==
Dobbs's political viewpoints changed during the Great Depression in the 1930s. Seeing the plight of workers in that situation (including himself), he became politically radicalized to the left.

In 1933, while working for the Pittsburgh Coal Company in Minneapolis, Dobbs joined the Teamsters. After getting to know the three Trotskyist Dunne brothers, (Miles, Vincent and Grant) and Swedish socialist Carl Skoglund, he joined the Communist League of America. Dobbs was one of the initiators of a general strike in Minneapolis, and for a while worked full-time as a union organizer.

He was influential in the Teamsters' shift from emphasis on local delivery work to over-the-road traffic, which keyed their great expansion towards becoming the largest union in the United States.

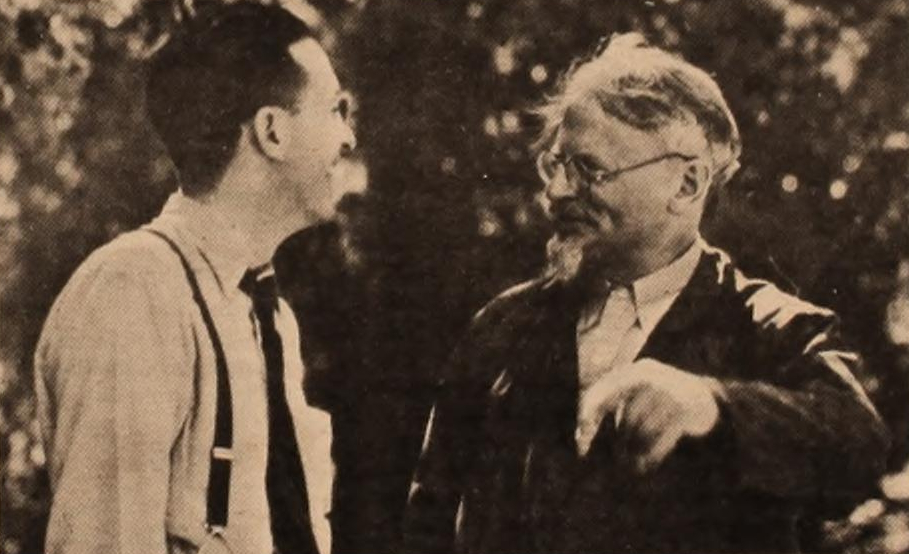
Dobbs meets with Leon Trotsky in Mexico c. 1940

Dobbs quit in 1939 to work for the new Socialist Workers Party (SWP). Dobbs met the Russian revolutionary leader Leon Trotsky when he visited Mexico shortly before Trotsky's death in 1940.

Dobbs served as mentor and advisor to a young Jimmy Hoffa, while Hoffa was making his rise within the Teamsters, eventually becoming its president in 1957. Dobbs primarily inspired Hoffa with his view that the capitalist system was a Darwinian struggle, where power, rather than morality, was the primary factor determining the eventual outcome.

For opposing World War II, he and other leaders of the SWP and the Minneapolis Teamsters were convicted of violating the Smith Act, which made it illegal to "conspire to advocate the violent overthrow of the United States Government". He served over a year of a 16-month sentence in Federal Correctional Institution, Sandstone, from 1944 to 1945.

== Presidential candidacy ==
After his release, he became the editor of the SWP's newspaper, The Militant. From 1948 to 1960 he was the SWP's candidate for President of the United States, running in four elections. He succeeded James P. Cannon as national secretary of the party in 1953, serving until 1972.

As a reporter for The Militant and as the party's presidential candidate, Dobbs travelled to Montgomery, Alabama to report on the trial of Martin Luther King Jr. After publishing articles supportive of the Montgomery bus boycott and calling on labor unions to join the fight, Dobbs went on a speaking tour to raise money to purchase station wagons that would be donated to the Montgomery Improvement Association's car pool.

In 1960, Farrell Dobbs and Joseph Hansen, Trotsky's former secretary in Mexico, went to Cuba to experience the revolutionary movement there. The two American Trotskyists decided to fully support the Cuban Revolution and the leadership of Fidel Castro and Che Guevara.

== Later life ==
Farrell Dobbs retired in 1972, but remained in the party until his death in 1983. He devoted the later part of his life to historical documentation of the American leftist movement and the Minnesota Teamsters. Dobbs was the author of a four-volume history / memoir of the Minneapolis struggles: Teamster Rebellion, Teamster Power, Teamster Politics and Teamster Bureaucracy. He had completed two volumes of a planned history of the Marxist movement in the United States at the time of his death, titled: Revolutionary Continuity: The Early Years, 1848-1917 and Birth of the Communist Movement, 1918-1922.

== Major works ==
- Trade Union Problems, New York, Pioneer Publishers, 1941
- The Voice of Socialism: Radio Speeches by The Socialist Workers Party Candidates In The 1948 Election (with Grace Carlson and James Cannon), New York, Pioneer Publishers, 1948
- Recent Trends In The Labor Movement, New York, National Education Dept., Socialist Workers Party, 1967
- The Structure And Organizational Principals Of The Party, New York, National Education Dept., Socialist Workers Party, 1971
- Teamster Rebellion, New York, Pathfinder Press, 1972
- Teamster Power, New York, Pathfinder Press, 1973
- Teamster Politics, New York, Pathfinder Press, 1975
- Teamster Bureaucracy, New York, Pathfinder Press, 1977
- Counter-Mobilization: A Strategy To Fight Racist And Fascist Attacks, New York, National Education Dept., Socialist Workers Party, 1976
- Revolutionary Continuity: Marxist Leadership In The U.S., Vol. 1: The Early Years, 1848–1917, New York, Monad Press, Distributed by Pathfinder Press, 1980
- Revolutionary Continuity: Marxist Leadership In The U.S., Vol. 2: Birth of the Communist Movement, 1918–1922, New York, Monad Press, Distributed by Pathfinder Press, 1983
- A Political Biography of Walter Reuther: The Record Of An Opportunist, by Beatrice Hansen, New York, Pathfinder Press, 1987 2nd ed. (contains Dobbs's essay Meany vs. Reuther)

== See also ==
- Minneapolis Teamsters Strike of 1934
- 1948 United States presidential election
- 1952 United States presidential election
- 1956 United States presidential election
- 1960 United States presidential election

Party political offices
Preceded by none	Socialist Workers Party nominee for President of the United States; 1948, 1952, 1956, 1960	Succeeded by Clifton DeBerry
