= Olga Rodriguez (activist) =

Olga Rodriguez is a Chicano activist and a leading member of the Socialist Workers Party of the United States.

== Life ==
Rodriguez first became active in the fight for Chicano rights in her home state of Texas, supporting the struggle to organize farmworkers in the Rio Grande Valley in the 1960s while a high school student in Brownsville. At the University of Houston, she joined the League of Mexican-American students, which was part of the fight for Chicano studies, bilingual-bicultural education, affirmative action, and U.S. withdrawal from Vietnam that swept the Southwest in the late 1960s and early 1970s. While a student at the university she also joined the Young Socialist Alliance and helped organize the first march in Houston against the war.

After moving to Los Angeles to help build the 4,000-strong Chicano contingent in the mammoth April 1971 San Francisco demonstration against the Vietnam War, Rodriguez joined the Los Angeles chapter of the Woman’s National Abortion Action Coalition, helping to organize actions for the legalization of abortion.

As Socialist Workers Party candidate for mayor of Los Angeles in 1973 and governor of California in 1974, Rodriguez used her campaigns to support and publicize the struggle of working people, including the battles of the United Farm Workers union.

Rodriguez served on the Socialist Workers Party’s National Committee from 1975–1988 and directed its work in solidarity with the Chicano movement from 1975 to 1979. This included collaboration with the Southwest Bureau of the Militant, set up in 1971 to give timely coverage to the developments in the struggle for Chicano liberation.

Rodriguez coordinated the SWP’s work in defense of the victorious Nicaraguan Revolution in 1979, as well as efforts in solidarity with the workers and farmers in El Salvador fighting against the U.S.-backed dictatorship. She has also been active in building solidarity with the Cuban Revolution.

== Works ==
- The Politics of Chicano Liberation, Pathfinder, 1977. ISBN 9780873485135, OCLC 491726604
