= Oscar Coover =

American Trotskyist and union organizer

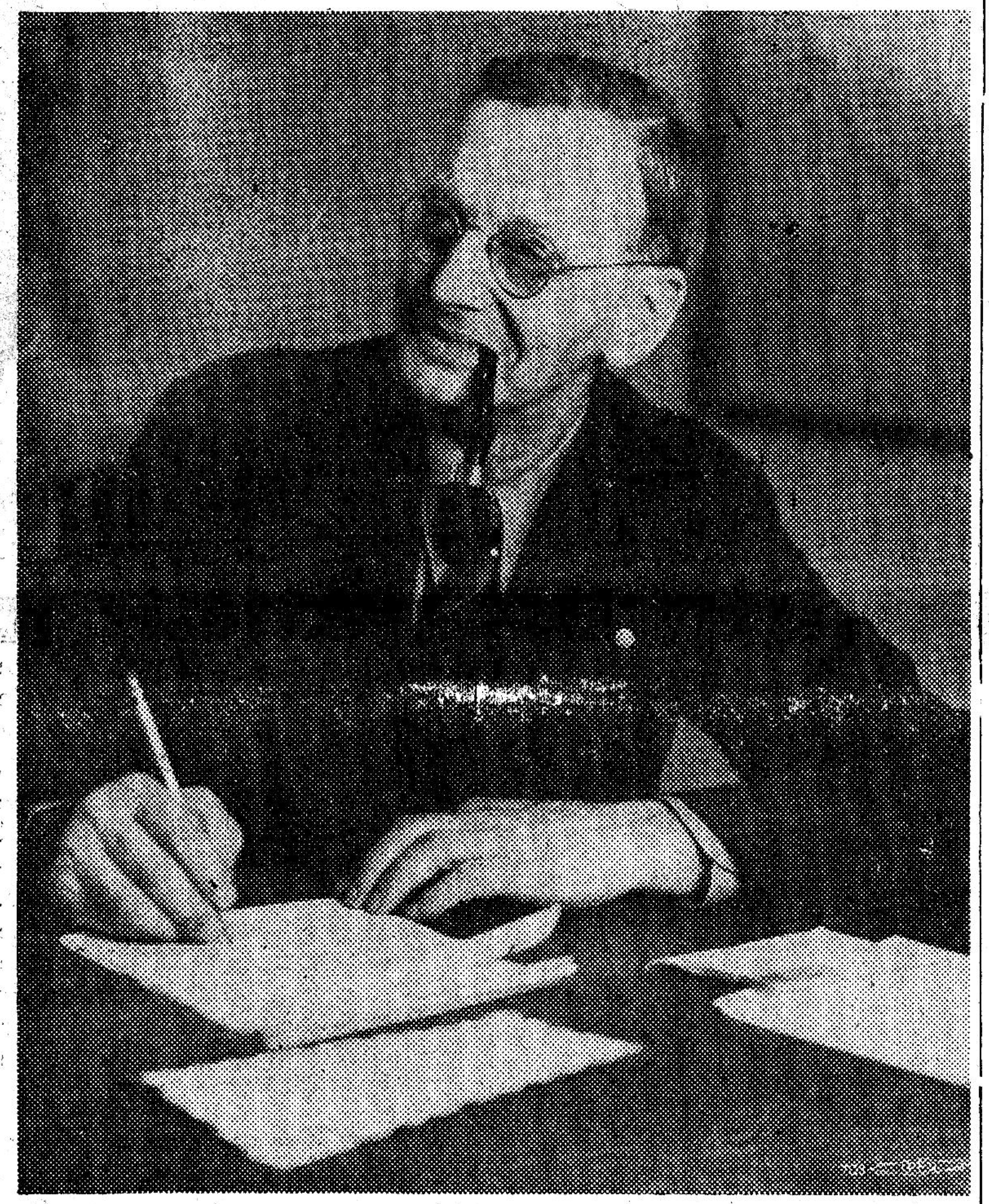

Oscar Coover (October 7, 1887 - May 3, 1950) was an American union organizer and founding member of the Socialist Workers Party.

== Biography ==
Coover was born in Republic, Missouri and worked as a railroad electrician until 1924. In 1919, Coover met Carl Skoglund who convinced him to join the Communist Party. During the Great Railroad Strike of 1922, Coover was the secretary of the Pullman and Great Western R.R. Employees' Strike Committee. The Communist Party expelled Coover in 1928 because of Trotskyist sympathies. Coover became a founding member of the Socialist Workers Party, along with Vincent Dunne and James P. Cannon.

In 1941, Coover was indicted along with twenty-eight other SWP leaders and charged under the Smith Act. In December 1941, Coover was found guilty of violating the Smith Act and was sentenced to sixteen months in prison. He died in New York, at Lenox Hospital, from spinal encephalitis.
