= Arne Swabeck =

Arne Swabeck (1890–1986) was an American communist leader.

Swabeck was born in Denmark and emigrated to the United States where he became one of the founding members of the Communist Party. In the late 1920s, he was expelled from the party as a Trotskyist and worked together with James P. Cannon and other American Trotskyists to create the Socialist Workers Party. Swabeck visited Leon Trotsky in his exile in Turkey in 1933.

In the late 1950s, Arne Swabeck became a Maoist and left the SWP in 1967. For a number of years, he was a member of the Progressive Labor Party. Swabeck wrote the book entitled The Split of the Socialist Party which was published by New England Free Press in 1969.

In 1980, Swabeck appeared as himself in the movie Reds. He was briefly interviewed as one of a series of elderly witnesses to events described in the movie.
