= Martin Abern =

American politician (1898–1949)

Martin "Marty" Abern
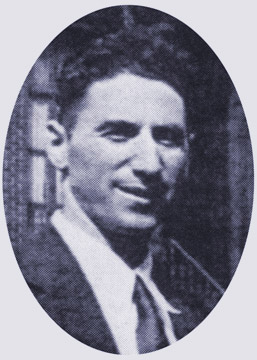
- Martin Abern, c. 1931
- Born: Martin Abramowitz; December 2, 1898; Bârlad, Kingdom of Romania
- Died: April 1949 (aged 50); U.S.
- Occupation: Politician
- Known for: Founding member of American Trotskyist movement
- Spouse: Lydia Winter (m. 1928)
- Parents: Joseph Abramovitz; Hinda Schwartz

Martin "Marty" Abern (né Abramowitz; December 2, 1898 – April 1949) was a Marxist politician who was an important leader of the Communist youth movement of the 1920s as well as a founder of the American Trotskyist movement.

== Early life ==
Martin Abern was born on December 2, 1898, in Berlad, Romania, the son of Joseph Abramovitz an ethnic Jewish peddler and Hinda Schwartz and brother of Rita Abramovitz. The family emigrated to the United States in 1902, moving to Minneapolis the following year. Abern attended public elementary school and high school in Minneapolis. He married Lydia Winter in November 1928.

== Career ==
=== Socialist ===
The young man was radically inclined from an early age, joining the Socialist Party of America's youth section, the Young People's Socialist League in 1912, the Socialist Party itself in 1915, as well as the Industrial Workers of the World. He attended the University of Minnesota for two years, starring on the football team. The radical Abern staunchly opposed World War I and following American entry into that conflict he refused induction into the military on political grounds. This refusal to join the military resulted in his expulsion from the university and ultimately led to a six-month prison term.

=== Communist ===
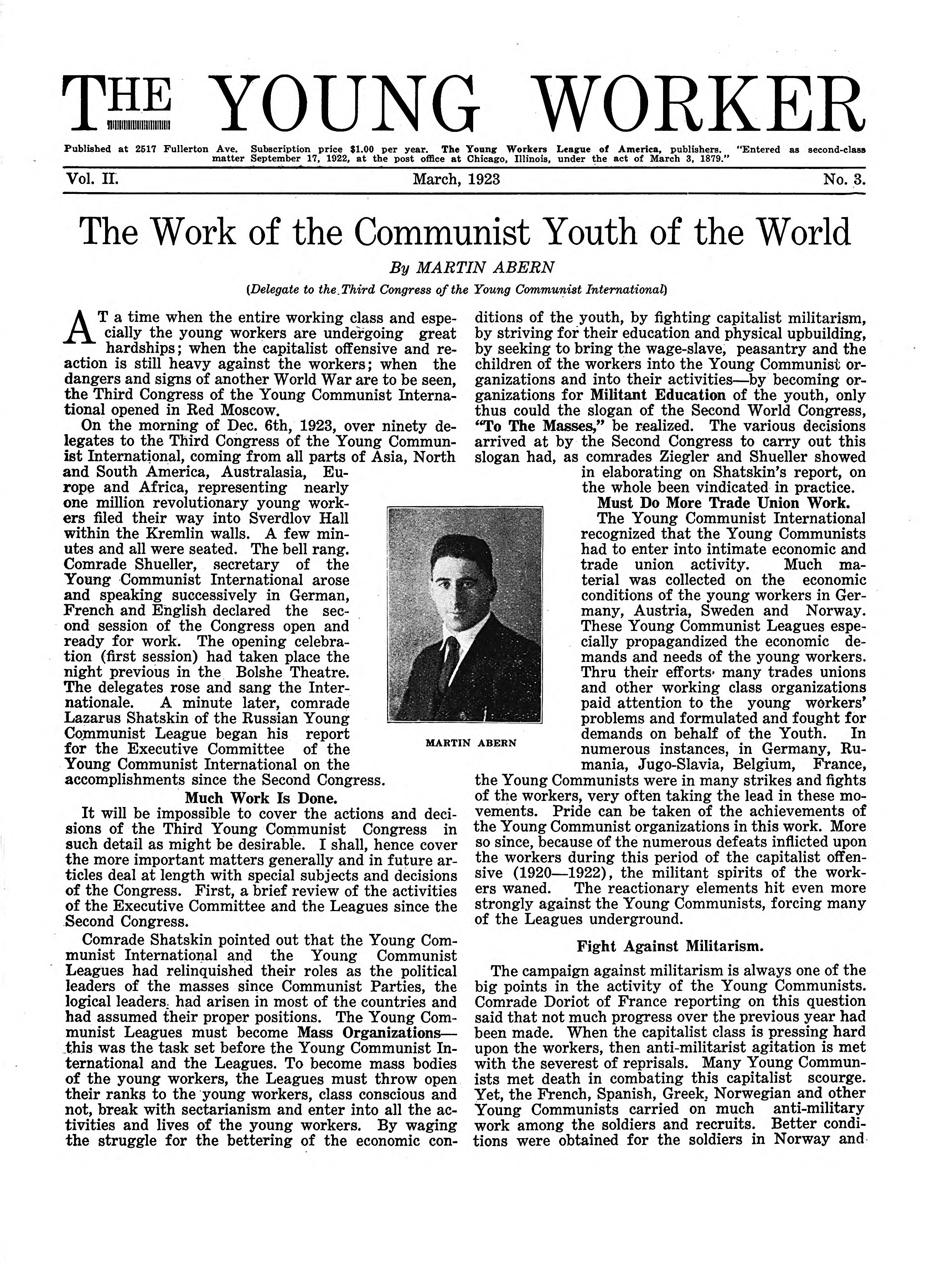
Abern on the cover of The Young Worker, March 1923

Abern seems to have been a member of the Communist Party of America at the time of its establishment in the fall of 1919 or shortly thereafter. In November 1920, the US Department of Justice attempted to make Abern a test case for the deportation of alien radicals citing Communist Party membership as sole grounds for action. He was saved from deportation at the last minute by a court order obtained by his attorney.

Abern was a delegate to the 2nd World Congress of the Young Communist International (YCI), held in Moscow in June 1921, where he was made a member of the Executive Committee of the YCI. He also held a seat on the governing National Executive Committee of the Young Workers League of America (YWL) from May 1922 and was reelected by the convention of that organization held the following year. Abern served as Secretary of the YWL from May 30, 1922, to October 19, 1922, ostensibly resigning for reasons of health.

Abern was also sent to Moscow to attend the 4th World Congress of the Comintern late in the fall of 1922. Upon his return he was made a member of the Central Executive Committee of the now legal Communist Party, the Workers Party of America, where he would develop a close ideological affinity and working relationship with James P. Cannon, a leading light of the legal party.

Abern also briefly was part of a three-person Secretariat running the Young Workers League in the summer and fall of 1924 before being replaced as National Secretary on October 15 by John Williamson. In 1925 Cannon became the National Secretary of International Labor Defense, the legal defense arm of the American Communist movement, Abern joined him as assistant national secretary and thereafter dedicated most of his effort in an attempt to build the size and influence of that parallel mass organization of the Workers (Communist) Party.

In 1926, Abern wrote a two-part, two-day article entitled "Can the Workers Write for Our Press?

Abern then took an important leadership role in the adult Workers (Communist) Party of America, becoming the District Organizer of the party's important Chicago district in 1928 and sitting on the governing Central Executive Committee of the organization. Abern was a steadfast supporter of the majority faction of Foster-Cannon-Lore during the bitter factional fighting that continued ceaselessly throughout the decade.

=== Trotskyist ===
Together with Jim Cannon and youth leader Max Shachtman, Abern was expelled from the Workers (Communist) Party in 1928 for supporting Leon Trotsky. He was a founding member of the Communist League of America (CLA) in May 1928 and sat on the governing National Committee of that organization from 1931 to 1934. In this interval Shachtman and Cannon were increasingly at odds with one another, with Abern tending to follow Shachtman in matters of controversy.

Abern was also a founding member of Workers Party of the United States in 1934, formed when the CLA merged with A.J. Muste's Workers Party. He was a member of the National Committee of that organization from 1934 to 1936. In that year he and other Trotskyists entered the Socialist Party en masse as part of the so-called "French Turn" tactic, a brief interlude ending with their expulsion late in 1937.

In 1938, Abern helped found the Socialist Workers Party (SWP) and he was on the National Committee of that organization from 1938 until 1940. The April 1940 convention of the SWP instructed the National Committee of the party to take disciplinary action against Abern, Shachtman, James Burnham, and their factional supporters if that group failed to abide by the decisions of the convention. In accordance with these instructions, the National Committee suspended Burnham, Shachtman, and Abern at its meeting of April 22, 1940, giving the members of this so-called "petty-bourgeois opposition" an opportunity to recant and return to the party. Burnham left the radical movement at this time, while Abern joined Max Shachtman's in establishing a new organization called the Workers Party of the United States (WPUS). The pair were expelled from the SWP by a Plenum Conference held in Chicago from Sept. 27 to 29, 1940.

Abern was elected to the governing National Committee of the WPUS at the time of its formation in 1940 and remained in the top leadership of that organization for the rest of his life.

== Death and legacy ==
Abern, who adopted the party name Harry Allen, was a central leader of the Workers Party and frequent contributor to its paper, Labor Action, until his death from a heart attack in April 1949. Abern was 50 years old at the time of his death.

Abern's papers comprise part of the John Dwyer Papers held by Wayne State University in Detroit, Michigan. A small collection of his correspondence with Leon Trotsky is also housed at the University of Michigan in Ann Arbor.

== External sources ==
- Max Shachtman, "Martin Abern: An Obituary," Labor Action [New York], May 9, 1949.
- Wolfgang Lubitz and Petra Lubitz, "Martin Abern," Lubitz TrotskyanaNet. Revised edition, November 2009.
- Finding Aid for the John Dwyer Papers, Walter P. Reuther Library, Wayne State University.
