= Vincent R. Dunne =

American union organizer (1889–1970)

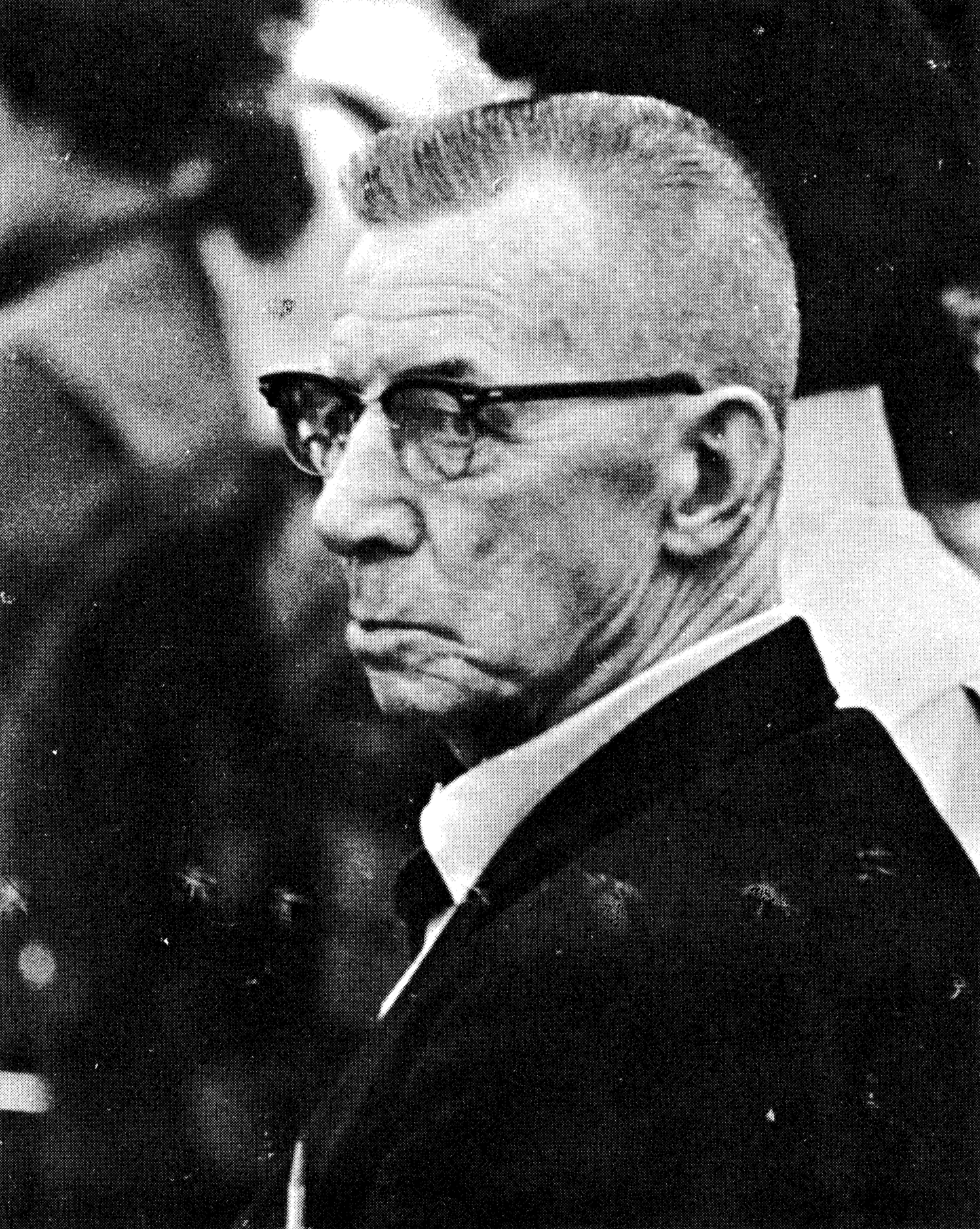
- Dunne c. 1970
- Born: Vincent Raymond Dunne; April 17, 1889; Kansas City, Kansas, U.S.
- Died: February 17, 1970 (aged 80)
- Occupations: Union organizer, teamster
- Organization(s): International Brotherhood of Teamsters; Industrial Workers of the World
- Political party: Socialist Workers Party; Communist League of America; Communist Party of America
- Movement: Trotskyism
- Criminal charge: Sedition (under the Smith Act)
- Spouse: Jennie Holme
- Children: 5
- Relatives: William F. Dunne (brother)

Vincent Raymond Dunne (17 April 1889 – 17 February 1970), also known as Vincent R. Dunne or Ray Dunne, was an American Trotskyist, teamster, lumberjack, and union organizer with the Industrial Workers of the World and the International Brotherhood of Teamsters. He is notable for his leading role in the 1934 Minneapolis general strike, his conviction and imprisonment under the anti-communist Smith Act, and his membership in the Socialist Workers Party and opposition to Stalinism.

== Early life ==
Dunne was born in Kansas City in 1889, the second of nine children. His mother was the daughter of a Wisconsin shoemaker and his father, a migrant worker from County Clare, Ireland, worked as a repairman for the local street railway. Tragedy struck early in his life when his father broke his kneecap on the job and his mother was forced to move him and his older brother to a farm by where her parents had settled near Little Falls, Minnesota, where they were eventually joined by his father after he had recovered. Adding to their hardships, their cabin burned down one winter when Dunne was six or seven, but they were able to rebuild with the help of neighbors. His father started to work again, this time as a lumberjack and building railway lines. By then, Dunne himself was working for pay on neighboring farms driving teams of horses and working the threshing rigs.

By fourteen, Dunne had left home to work at lumber camps throughout Minnesota, in conditions he found deplorable. Moving further west the next year, he harvested grain in North Dakota. In 1905, he went further west to Montana, where he encountered the Industrial Workers of the World (IWW) in lumber camps. Dunne was immediately struck by the difference in conditions between the union lumber camps and the non-union camps back in Minnesota, finding the union bunkhouses spacious, comfortable, and hygienic. The union also proved a source for cheap literature, which Dunne, who had been forced to leave school to work after only five years, enthusiastically embraced, reading titles like Charles Darwin's On the Origin of Species.

During the Panic of 1907, large numbers of workers were laid off and Dunne, along with fellow workers of the IWW, travelled west to Seattle looking for jobs. They found themselves living in large camps of unemployed workers, where they began soapboxing to campaign for jobs and aid to be provided to the unemployed. Eventually, a state road-building project was commissioned to provide jobs for some of the unemployed, but Dunne traveled south to California, where in Los Angeles he was sentenced to a road construction chain gang that helped build Sunset Boulevard. He moved on to Louisiana, where he organized a strike among sawmill workers. The strike failed, but it laid the groundwork for the creation of the multiracial Brotherhood of Timber Workers. After a brief stint in Texas, Dunne moved to Minneapolis, an IWW stronghold at the time, and organized teamsters after becoming frustrated with the conservatism of the American Federation of Labor (AFL).

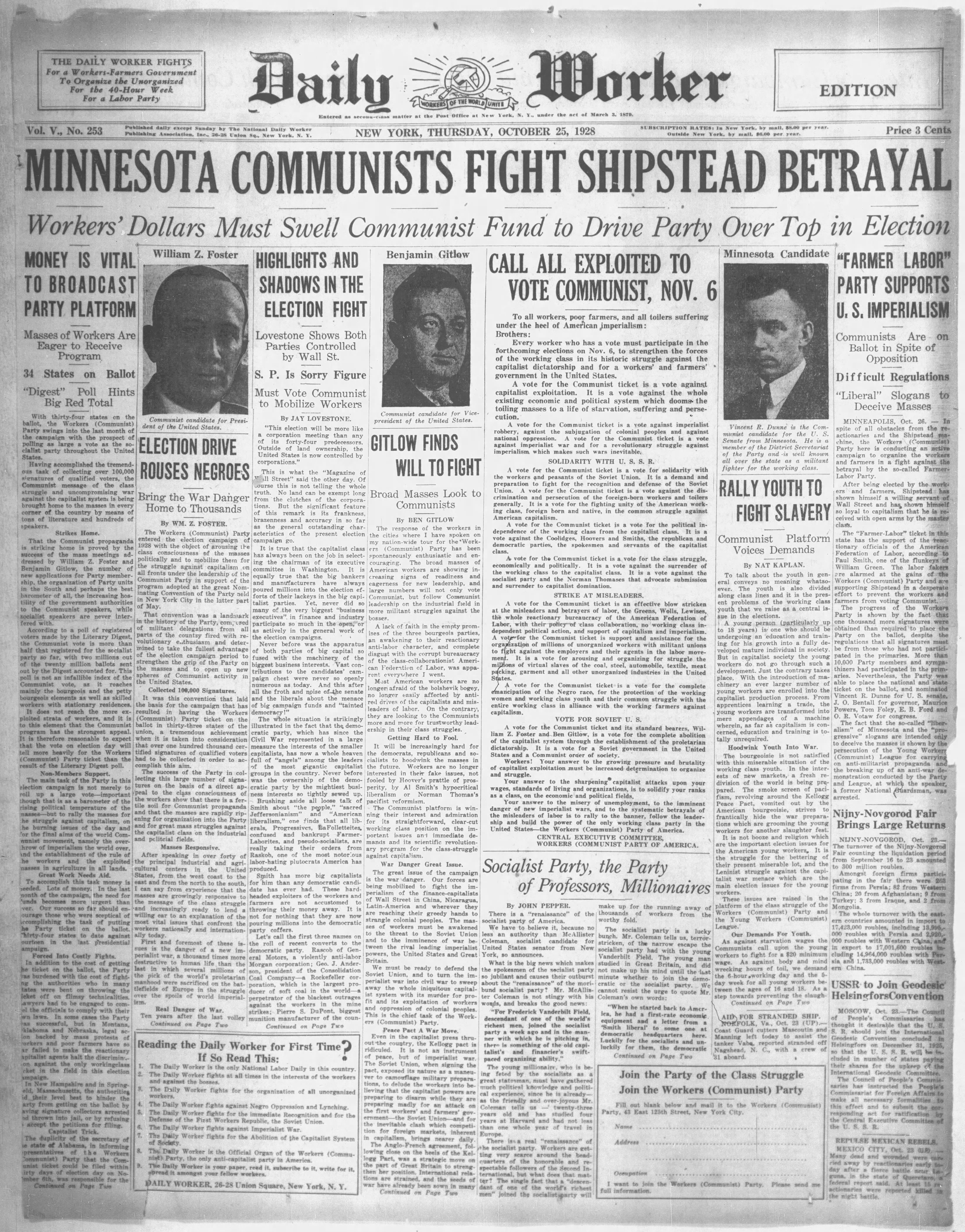
Dunne (right) on the cover of the Daily Worker, October 25, 1928

In 1914, Dunne married Jennie Holme. They had two children together, and adopted three others. By the late 1910s, he had drifted away from the IWW's organizing and more toward campaigning for Eugene V. Debs and his Socialist Party of America. The break with the IWW was solidified after the Russian Revolution, when Dunne joined the Communist Party of America in 1920. In 1928 he became a victim of the "Factional War" when Party members who opposed Joseph Stalin, and supported the theses of Leon Trotsky, were purged. Unfazed, Dunne and his comrades formed the Communist League of America (later renamed the Socialist Workers Party) in alignment with Trotsky's Left Opposition to Stalinism. Dunne was a vocal critic of the Communist Party after the expulsion of the Left Opposition, especially regarding the Party's "raids" on Communist League-controlled front organizations and co-operative businesses.

== International Brotherhood of Teamsters ==
By 1934, Dunne had been organizing teamsters in Minneapolis for twenty-five years; Trotsky called him "the most effective labor leader in America". With his brothers Miles and Grant, Dunne took effective control of Teamsters Local 574 and knew "four or five hundred workers in Minneapolis [...] personally." During the strike, he and his brothers dealt with espionage from police and private detectives, as well as personal attacks from local newspapers. Nevertheless, the strike eventually succeeded and Teamster membership in Minneapolis grew rapidly.

Dunne's fate changed in the 1940s. As the Second Red Scare began to grip the nation, the Socialist Workers Party found their offices raided and their top officials, including Dunne, accused of sedition under the anti-communist Smith Act. These moves were seen by Trotskyists as an anti-communist conspiracy between the FBI and the Teamsters national leadership, represented by Daniel J. Tobin, who sought to eliminate the radical Minneapolis local. Dunne and the other SWP leaders were found guilty, and in 1943 he was sent to Sandstone federal prison along with prominent Trotskyists such as James P. Cannon. Dunne served sixteen months.

== Later years ==
After his release from prison, Dunne unsuccessfully ran for mayor of Minneapolis in 1943 and 1947. He embarked on three national speaking tours, and served as chairman of the Socialist Workers Party in Minnesota. In 1948, 1952 and 1954, he was the Socialist Workers Party candidate for U.S. Senator from Minnesota, and tallied approximately 4,000 votes each time. His last years were marked by his fierce opposition to the Vietnam War. He died on February 17, 1970, at age 80.
