= The Militant =

Socialist newsweekly published in the United States

- Front page of The Militant, May 2025
- Type: Newsweekly
- Editor: John Studer
- Founded: November 15, 1928; 97 years ago
- Language: English, French, Spanish
- Headquarters: 306 West 37th Street, 13th floor New York City, New York 10018
- City: New York City
- Country: United States
- Website: www.themilitant.com

The Militant is a socialist newsweekly connected to the United States Socialist Workers Party (SWP) and the Pathfinder Press. It is published in the United States and distributed in other countries such as Canada, the United Kingdom, Australia, France, Sweden, Iceland, and New Zealand.

== Publication history ==
=== Forerunners ===
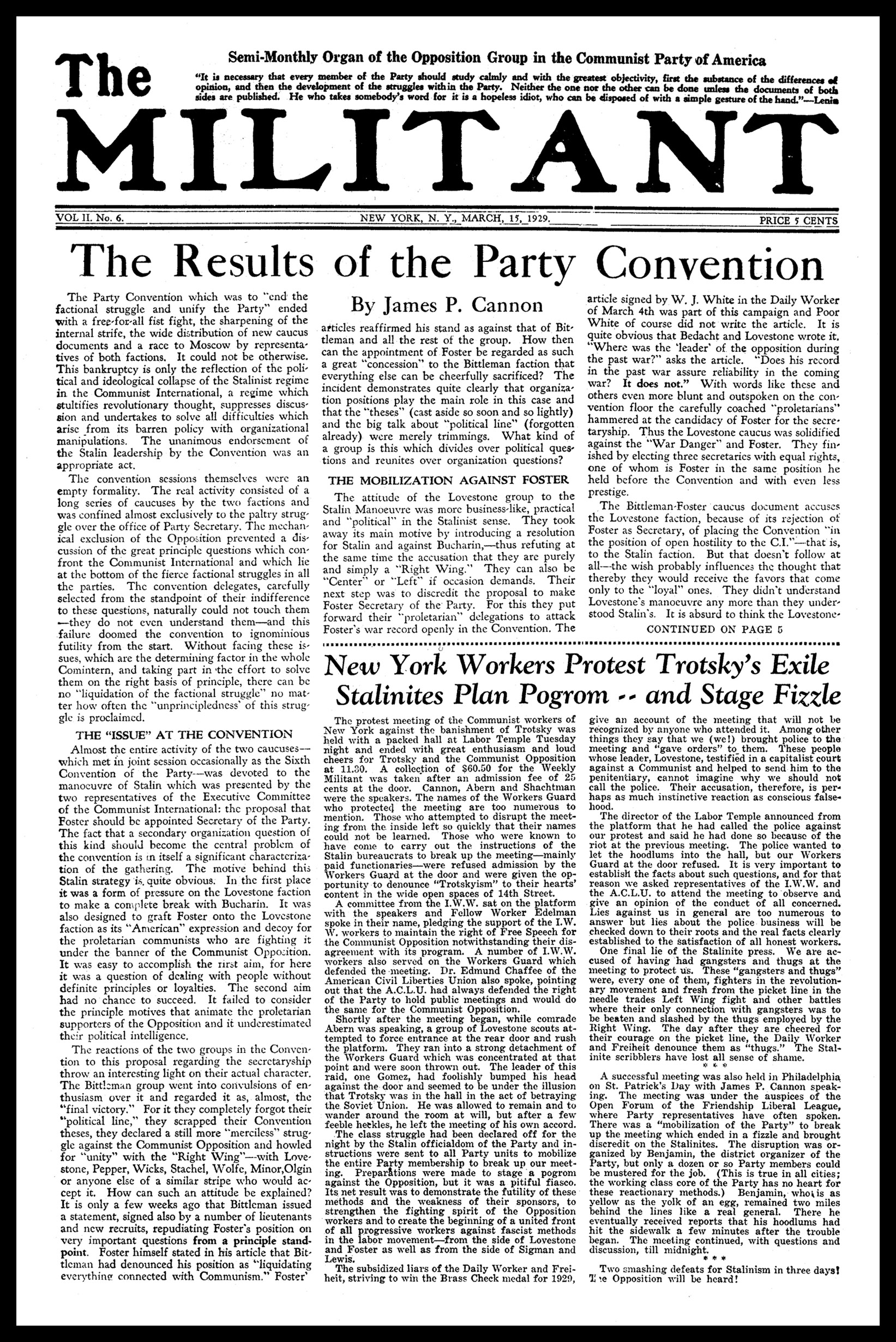
March 15, 1929 edition of The Militant

An earlier publication called The Militant was launched in November 1928 by James P. Cannon and other American Trotskyists gathered together in the Communist League of America (CLA). It declared its goal to be a fight "in the interest of the working people" against the capitalist system, imperialist wars, and the Stalinist regime in the Soviet Union, which according to the Trotskyists had betrayed and corrupted the October Revolution.

The original Militant terminated in 1934 at the time of the merger of the Cannon-led CLA with the American Workers Party headed by A. J. Muste to form the Workers Party of the United States (WPUS). The paper was succeeded by a similar broadsheet that served as the official organ of the WPUS called the New Militant, edited by Cannon. This paper was in turn terminated after about 18 months when the main section of the WPUS joined the Socialist Party of America en masse in 1936 and was replaced by a new publication Socialist Appeal by Trotskyists in the SPA. Albert Goldman edited the Chicago-based publication from 1935, he and other Trotskyists in Chicago had joined the SPA prior to the rest of the WPUS. In 1937, the newspaper was transferred to New York City.

=== Current publication ===
The Socialist Workers Party was founded on December 31, 1937, by Trotskyists following the expulsion of the "Socialist Appeal faction" from the Socialist Party of America. The SWP's newspaper continued to be known as Socialist Appeal until 1941 when it was renamed The Militant. This publication has continued without interruption.

Trotsky reading The Militant, c. 1936

In 1964, The Militant gained unwanted attention when it was revealed during the Warren Commission that Lee Harvey Oswald had his wife, Marina Oswald Porter take two photographs of him around March 31, 1963 posing in his backyard holding a copy of The Militant and another communist newspaper The Worker in one hand and the rifle that he would later use on November 22 to assassinate John F. Kennedy on the other (he held them in different hands in both photographs). These photographs were considered important evidence in the investigation as it proved the rifle was his. In the 1970s, another photograph of the same was found and was used in a later investigation in 1977.

In the summer of 2005, The Militant became a bilingual newspaper, published in both English and Spanish (El Militante), and with lead articles and editorials appearing in both languages. A French edition was inaugurated in 2012 named Le Militant.

The Militant is not officially owned or controlled by the SWP. To protect the party and the paper, The Militant is owned by an unidentified private group, although the endorsement the paper gives to the SWP is clear.

== Sources ==
- "Chapter 4: The Assassin". Report of the President's Commission on the Assassination of President John F. Kennedy. Washington, D.C.: United States Government Printing Office. 1964. p. 191.
