= Workers Party of the United States =

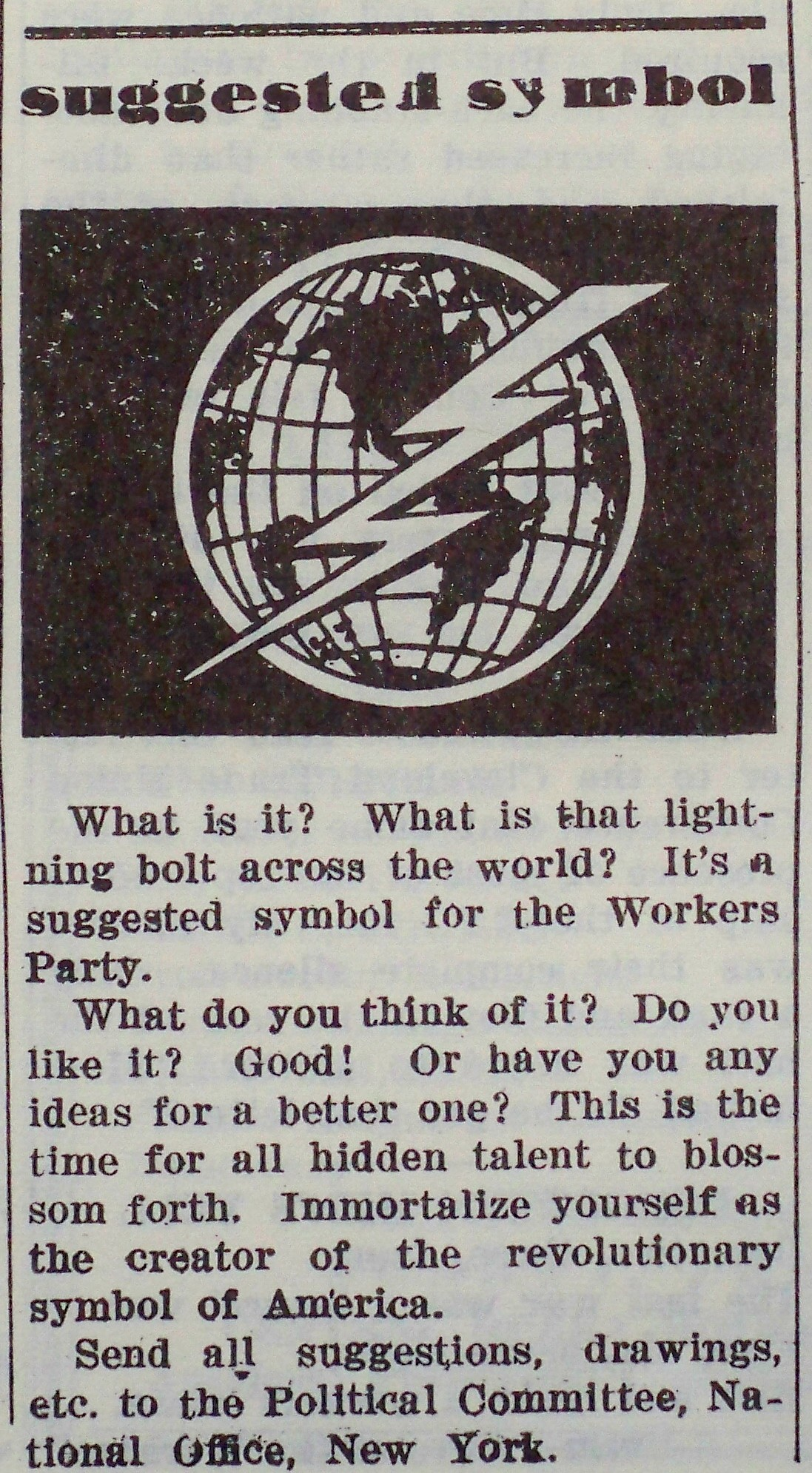
- Logo suggested for the organization.
- Abbreviation: WPUS
- Founders: A. J. Muste; James P. Cannon
- Founded: December 1934
- Dissolved: 1936
- Merger of: American Workers Party, Communist League of America
- Merged into: Socialist Party of America
- Succeeded by: Socialist Workers Party
- Newspaper: New Militant
- Ideology: Trotskyism
- Political position: Far-left

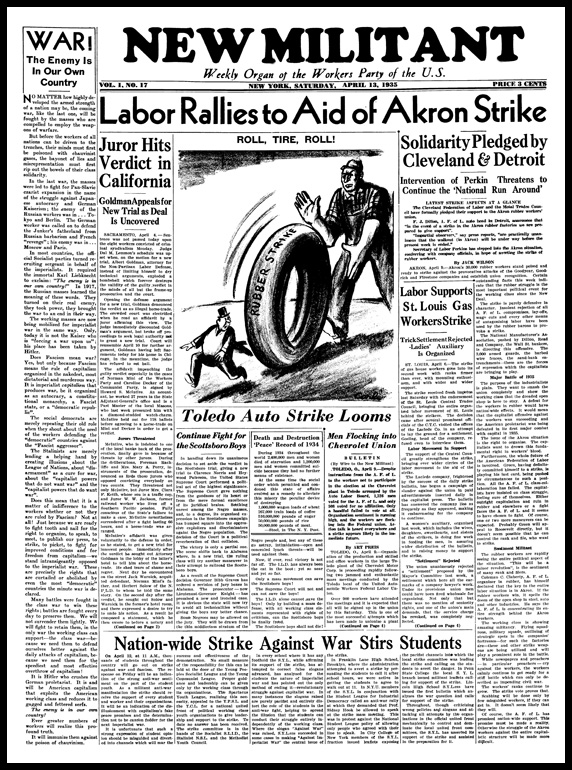
The New Militant was the official organ of the Workers Party of the US throughout its approximately 18 months of existence.

The Workers Party of the United States (WPUS) was established in December 1934 by a merger of the American Workers Party (AWP) led by A.J. Muste and the Trotskyist Communist League of America (CLA) led by James P. Cannon. The party was dissolved in 1936 when its members entered the Socialist Party of America en masse.

== Organizational history ==
=== Fusion ===
The formation of the U.S. Workers Party was the fusion of two revolutionary socialist organizations that had both successfully led two militant strikes to victory. The Communist League of America had led the Minneapolis Teamsters Strike of 1934 and the American Workers Party helped lead the 1934 Toledo Auto-Lite strike to victory.

These strikes, along with the 1934 West Coast Longshore Strike (led by the Communist Party USA), were important victories after years of union defeats led by class collaborationist union bureaucrats. As such they served as catalysts for the rise of industrial unionism in the 1930s, much of which was organized through the Congress of Industrial Organizations.

Speaking of the role of vanguard parties leading the 1934 strike wave James P. Cannon said, “It has been the lack of precisely this element, which only a Marxist party can supply, that condemned the insurgent labor movement of the past to futility and defeat. Lacking a class theory of its own, which can come into the labor movement in no other way than through the Marxist party, the American workers, with all their militancy and capacity for sacrifice, fell victim to all kinds of quackery and treason and landed in a blind alley every time.”

It was also these strikes that led to the fusion of the two organizations.

In 1933 the American Workers Party had initially formed as a separate organization from the Trotskyist Communist League of America (CLA) partly out of the concern that the CLA did not have a strong base in American politics. The origins of the CLA was a split from the Communist Party USA over the deep theoretical differences between Leon Trotsky and Joseph Stalin and how those differences related to building the world communist movement.

Yet after both the CLA and AWP had successfully led important strikes in 1934 James P. Cannon declared, “We, on our part, venture to say that the work of the League in the Minneapolis strikes helped convince the members of the AWP that we also are able to “speak American"; that our internationalism is not an abstraction but a guide to action on the national field. Joint work of the two organizations in practical work, limited though it has been, has demonstrated in practice an ability to work out a common policy and to cooperate loyally in advancing it.”

=== Socialist Party of America ===
Many members of the Workers Party of the United States, in turn, decided to join the Socialist Party of America in 1936 to propagate their views inside that party. The Socialist Party had developed a left wing and the party had declared itself open to other tendencies. As members of the Socialist Party the Trotskyists continued to exist as an independent tendency and continued publishing their own newspaper, Socialist Appeal. However, soon differences developed between the rest of the party and the "Socialist Appeal tendency", as the Trotskyists were known, and they split to form their own group, the Socialist Workers Party, soon thereafter.

== Publications ==
=== Newspaper ===
- New Militant: Weekly Organ of the Workers Party of the U.S.. James P. Cannon, editor. New York.
  - Volume 1: December 14, 1934 to December 28, 1935.
  - Volume 2: January 4, 1936 to June 6, 1936.

=== Pamphlets ===
- Declaration of Principles and Constitution of the Workers Party of the US. New York: Workers Party of the US/Pioneer Publishers, 1935.
- Which Party for the American worker? by A. J. Muste New York : Published for the Workers Party of the U.S. by Pioneer Publishers, 1935
- John West (pseudonym for James Burnham), War and the Workers. New York: Workers Party of US, 1935.
- May Day Manifesto of the Workers Party of the United States. New York: Workers Party of the US, 1935.
