= Carl Skoglund =

Swedish-American socialist

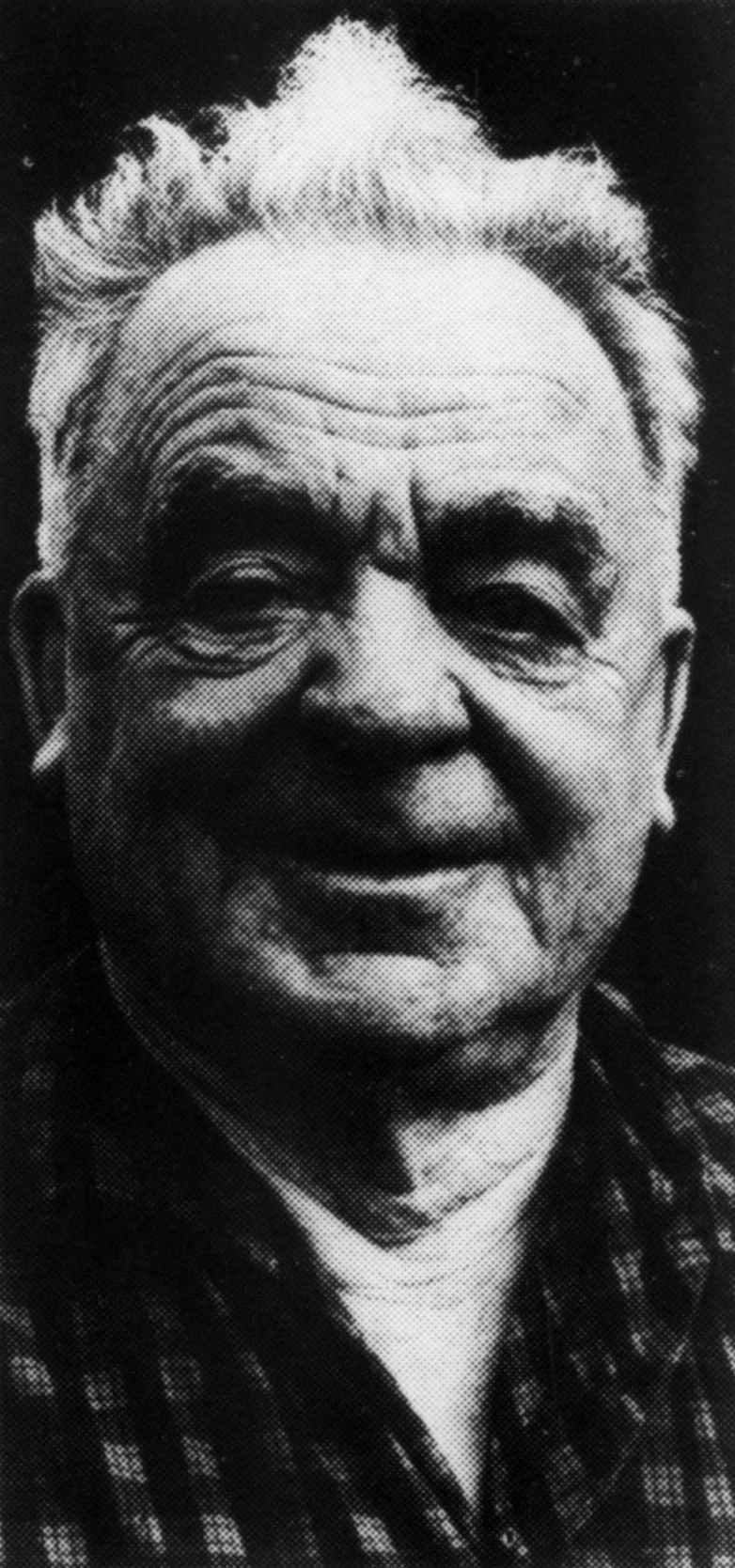
- Born: April 10, 1884; Dalsland, Sweden
- Died: December 11, 1960 (aged 76)
- Occupation: Trade unionist
- Known for: Founder of the American Communist Party, co-founder of the Socialist Workers Party
- Political party: Socialist Workers; American Communist; Socialist Party of America; Swedish Social Democratic

Carl Skoglund (April 10, 1884 – December 11, 1960) was a Swedish-American socialist, affectionately called Skogie by all his American friends and comrades. He was born in Dalsland and traveled to the United States in 1911, sailing in steerage first on board the Swedish ship Oslo, sailing from Gothenburg to Hull, England; and thence on the White Star Line ship Cymric, sailing from Liverpool to Boston; his destination was Minneapolis. After spending some time in the Industrial Workers of the World he became one of the founders of the American Communist Party and later became a Trotskyist and one of the co-founders of the Socialist Workers Party.

== Early life in Sweden ==
As Carl entered his teens his father died, making it necessary for him, as the oldest child, to leave school and earn a living for the family. He found a job in a pulp mill. Wages were low and working conditions hard in the mill, so Skoglund organized a union and lead a strike for better conditions.

Through his experience in the class struggle, he became interested in Marxism and joined the Swedish Social Democratic Party. Later on Skoglund was called up for service in the Swedish army. When the conscripts were kept in uniform beyond the legal period of compulsory service, he became one of the leaders of a soldiers' protest movement demanding that they be demobilized. For his militant political activities, Skoglund was blacklisted and could not find a job in Sweden. In 1911, he decided to go to the United States. His fiancée remained behind and they were never rejoined.

== In America ==
In the United States, Skoglund joined the IWW and spent a period on a railroad construction gang after which he went into the woods working as a lumberjack. There he suffered a serious foot injury, after which the company fired him.

Skoglund went to Minneapolis where he sought medical care, maintaining himself by working as a janitor and boiler tender. As the injury mended and he could get around better, he worked as a mechanic and took job as a car repairman in the railway shop. Skoglund joined the Socialist Party of Eugene V. Debs in 1914 and became one of the left-wing leaders of the Party's Scandinavian Federation. Skoglund helped translate the works of Karl Marx from German to English.

In 1917, a split in the Socialist Party was caused by the Russian Revolution in which the left wing of the party provided the main force to found the American Communist Party in 1919, which became affiliated with the Communist International led by Lenin, Zinoviev and Trotsky. Carl Skoglund was one of the founding members of the American Communist Party. In 1922, after having been the organizer and leader of a major strike, Skoglund was blacklisted on the railroads, and he had to turn to driving a coal truck for a living.

== Socialist Workers Party ==
Carl Skoglund was expelled from the Communist Party in 1928 for opposing Stalinism and supporting Trotsky and Bolshevism–Leninism. Carl Skoglund helped the American Trotskyist James P. Cannon (also expelled from the CP) to found the Socialist Workers Party in 1938. Skoglund also played an important part in the great Teamsters strike in Minneapolis in the 1930s together with Farrell Dobbs and Ray Dunne. Skoglund was one of the 18 SWP leaders (including Cannon, Dunne, and Dobbs) imprisoned in World War II under the Smith Act, receiving a 16-month sentence. The US government tried to deport Carl Skoglund in the 1950s and he was still under deportation orders on the day he died in 1960.

== Other sources ==
- Ross, Carl Radicalism in Minnesota, 1900–1960: a survey of selected sources (Minnesota Historical Society Press. 1994)
