= Socialist Workers Party (United States) =

Political party

- Logo used by the party on discussion bulletins before 1965.
- Abbreviation: SWP
- National Secretary: Jack Barnes
- Founder: James P. Cannon
- Founded: January 1938; 88 years ago
- Split from: Socialist Party of America
- Preceded by: Workers Party of the United States
- Headquarters: 306 W. 37th Street, 13th floor New York City, New York 10018
- Newspaper: The Militant
- Ideology: Communism; Castroism (from 1959); Trotskyism (until 1980s); Zionism (since late 2000s)
- Political position: Far-left
- International affiliation: Fourth International (1938–1953); International Committee of the Fourth International (1953–1963); United Secretariat of the Fourth International (1963–1990); Pathfinder tendency (since 1990)
- Colors: Maroon
- Members in elected offices: 0

Website
- themilitant.com

The Socialist Workers Party (SWP) is a communist party in the United States.

SWP was created in 1938 after Communist Party USA expelled supporters of Leon Trotsky (against Joseph Stalin). For most of its history, SWP was the largest Trotskyist organization in the US. In the 1980s, the SWP turned from Trotskyism towards Castroism. Since the 2000s, SWP has supported Zionism. In the 1960s and 1970s, SWP and its youth wing, the Young Socialist Alliance, were together the 3rd-largest socialist organizations, below the Communist Party USA and Students for a Democratic Society. SWP suffered many splits and its membership declined.

The modern SWP is smaller than its progeny, such as the Trotskyist Socialist Alternative and the Marxist-Leninist Party for Socialism and Liberation. SWP focuses much of its energy on distributing The Militant, a socialist weekly, selling Pathfinder Press books, and running candidates on the SWP ballot line.

== History ==
=== Origins ===
The SWP traces its origins back to the former Communist League of America (CLA), founded in 1928 by members of the Communist Party USA (CPUSA) who were expelled for supporting Russian communist leader Leon Trotsky against Joseph Stalin.

In the 1930s, the CLA pursued a "French Turn" of entryism into larger groups. In 1934, CLA merged with the American Workers Party to form the Workers Party of the United States (WPUS). WPUS was deeply divided over entryism. In 1935, the pro-entryism majority faction won, and WPUS determined to enter the Socialist Party of America. A minority faction split to form the Revolutionary Workers League. In 1936, the WPUS joined the Socialist Party of America (SPA), the largest US socialist organization. In 1937, after a year of acrimony, the SPA expelled the Trotskyists, who formed the Socialist Workers Party (SWP).

=== 1940s–1950s ===
In 1940, the SWP was split between a majority faction, led by Jim Cannon, who held Trotsky's position that the Soviet Union was a "degenerated workers' state" that should be supported, and a minority faction, led by Max Shachtman and James Burnham who opposed the SU in its war with Finland. Like this debate, most SPW factional disputes centered on revolutions in other countries. The minority faction split and formed the Workers Party, taking almost 40% of the party's membership and 80% of its youth organization.

During World War II, the SWP adopted the Fourth International's "Proletarian Military Policy", which opposed the war as "imperialist". Many party leaders were arrested under the Smith Act of 1941, including Cannon. (See also Smith Act Trials.) The SWP supported labor strikes, despite the popular wartime "no-strike pledge". The SWP also held protests against racist discrimination, such as A. Philip Randolph's March on Washington Movement.

The SWP grew after the war, but was soon beset by splits. In 1947, the Johnson–Forest Tendency left the Workers Party and rejoined the SWP, then left in 1951 to form the Correspondence Publishing Committee. In 1953, supporters of Pabloism split from the SWP to form the American Socialist Union. In 1958, Sam Marcy's Global Class War faction, which supported the suppression of the Hungarian Revolution of 1956, split from the SWP to form the Workers World Party.

=== 1960s–1970s ===
In the 1960s and 1970s, The SWP grew again amidst anti-war activism and radical youth movements. In 1963, the SWP successfully negotiated a reunification of the splintered Fourth International, leading the International Secretariat of the Fourth International (ISFI) and the International Committee of the Fourth International (ICFI) to merge into the reunified Fourth International (USFI). In 1962, the Revolutionary Tendency (RT) faction rejected this merger. The RT itself split into a majority faction and the Reorganized Minority Tendency (RMT) minority faction. In 1963, the SWP expelled both, and the RT formed the Spartacist League and the RMT formed the Socialist Equality Party. In 1966, in protest of alleged suppression of internal democracy, the Seattle branch left to form the Freedom Socialist Party, as did Murray and Myra Tanner Weiss. These groups later attempted to form the Committee for a Revolutionary Socialist Party. After the collapse of Students for a Democratic Society in 1969, the SWP's youth organization saw massive growth. In the 1970s, SWP membership and influence went into decline.

During the 1960s, the SWP supported both the civil rights movement and the black nationalist movement, specifically praising the militancy of black nationalist leader Malcolm X, who spoke at SWP forums until his 1965 assassination. The SWP also increasingly supported the Cuban Revolution and Fidel Castro, which SWP leaders including Cannon and Joseph Hansen saw as qualitatively different from the Stalinist states of Eastern Europe. In 1972, Jack Barnes became national secretary and further shifted the SWP toward Castroism. From 1961 to 1976, the FBI conducted COINTELPRO operations against the SWP, revealed by the Church Committee report of 1976. Between 1960 and 1976, the FBI obtained 1,300 informants within the SWP and YSA, including a member of the SWP National Committee. In 1986, the SWP won a lawsuit against the FBI.

=== 1980s–1990s ===
In 1978, the SWP decided the party's key task was the "turn to industry", which entailed party members getting jobs in blue-collar industries in preparation for increasing mass struggles. This provoked enormous dissent.

In the 1970s–1980s, the SWP drifted away from the Trotskyist label. In 1982, SWP director Jack Barnes gave a speech, Their Trotsky and Ours: Communist Continuity Today, in which he rejected Trotsky's theory of permanent revolution. Several Trotskyist opposition groups formed, which were expelled in 1983, and would form Fourth Internationalist Tendency, Socialist Action, and Solidarity. The SWP formally left the Trotskyist Fourth International in 1990. SWP's international formation is the Pathfinder tendency, named because each party operates a Pathfinder Bookstore that sells SWP's Pathfinder Press publications.

=== Decline ===
Since the 1990s, the SWP has experienced an unusually long period of internal peace. It has also declined steadily in both membership and political influence. In 2003, the party sold its headquarters. In 2021, a former member said SWP's 100 remaining members were "retired or nearly so".

== Structure and composition ==
SWP is a dues-paying membership organization. The SWP's membership was under 100 in 1929, about 200 in the 1930s, about 1000 in 1936 and 2000 in 1937 after entryism in the Socialist Party of America, about 1500 in 1975 after Students for a Democratic Society collapsed, and about 100 members in 2021.

== Ideology ==
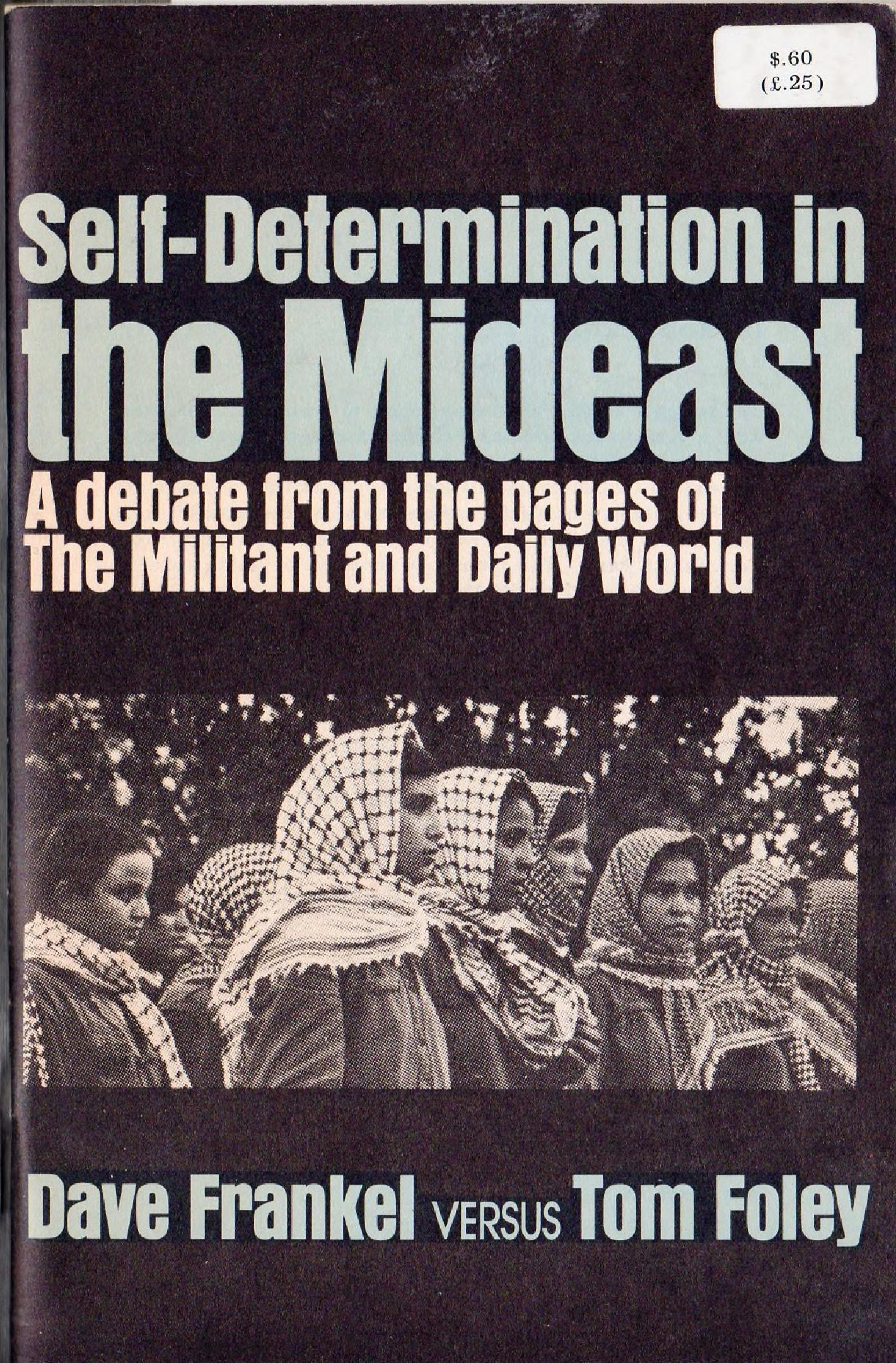
Cover of Self-Determination in the Mideast, published by Pathfinder Press in April 1974

The SWP is strongly supportive of Cuba. It also condemns the Russian invasion of Ukraine.

From the 1960s to the 1990s, the SWP opposed Zionism. But in the late 2000s, the SWP began to equate anti-Zionism with antisemitism. Unlike many other U.S. socialist organizations, which have maintained, or adopted, anti-Zionist positions, the SWP has become increasingly supportive of Israel. It denies Israeli war crimes and the Gaza genocide.

On November 5, 2022, during the California abortion proposition debate, Betsey Stone announced the SWP's opposition to the constitutional amendment in The Militant, saying, "We need to fight to make abortion rarer by changing the social conditions that have led to its widespread use".

== Election results ==
SWP has fielded electoral candidates for local, state, and federal offices.

No SWP candidate has yet won a major contested, partisan election.

=== Presidential elections ===
The SWP has run candidates for President since 1948. It received its greatest number of votes in 1976, when its candidate Peter Camejo received 90,310 votes.

Year	Presidential candidate	Vice presidential candidate	Popular votes	%	Electoral votes	Result	Ballot access	Notes	Ref
2024	Rachele Fruit	Dennis Richter	4,111	0.00%	0	Lost	58 / 538		
2020	Alyson Kennedy	Malcolm Jarrett	6,791	0.00%	0	Lost	54 / 538		
2016	Alyson Kennedy	Osborne Hart	12,467	0.01%	0	Lost	60 / 538		
2012	James Harris	Maura DeLuca	4,117	0.00%	0	Lost	59 / 538		
2008	Róger Calero	Alyson Kennedy (Note: In 2008, as in 2004, Róger Calero was constitutionally unqualified for the presidency because Calero is not an American citizen, so James Harris ran as an alternate in some states.)	7,575 (Note: 5,151 votes for Calero-Kennedy, 2,424 for Harris-Kennedy.)	0.00%	0	Lost	128 / 538		
2004	Róger Calero	Arrin Hawkins (Note: In 2004, as in 1972, both Róger Calero Arrin Hawkins were constitutionally unqualified for the presidency because Calero is not an American citizen and Hawkins was 29 years old, with the minimum age being 35. James Harris and Margaret Trowe, the SWP's ticket from 2000, stood in on the ballot in some states where Calero and Hawkins could not be listed.)	11,088 (Note: 3,677 votes for Calero-Hawkins, 7,411 for Harris-Trowe.)	0.01%	0	Lost	150 / 538		
2000	James Harris	Margaret Trowe	7,378	0.01%	0	Lost	150 / 538		
1996	James Harris	Laura Garza	8,463	0.01%	0	Lost	105 / 538		
1992	James "Mac" Warren	Willie Mae Reid	23,096	0.02%	0	Lost	146 / 538		
1988	James "Mac" Warren	Kathleen Mickells	15,604	0.02%	0	Lost	153 / 538		
1984	Melvin T. Mason	Matilde Zimmermann	24,672	0.02%	0	Lost	150 / 538		
1980	Clifton DeBerry (Note: Because DeBerry did not qualify for ballot access in some states, Andrew Pulley ran as an alternate in California, Colorado, Delaware, Georgia, Kentucky, Mississippi, New Jersey, New Mexico and South Dakota, and Richard Congress in Ohio.)	Matilde Zimmermann	49,031 (Note: 38,738 for DeBerry-Zimmerman, 6,264 for Pulley-Zimmerman, 4,029 for Congress-Zimmerman.)	0.05%	0	Lost			
1976	Peter Camejo	Willie Mae Reid	90,986	0.11%	0	Lost			
1972	Linda Jenness (Note: In 1972, Jenness was constitutionally unqualified for the presidency (under Article II, section 1) because Jenness was 31 years old. As a result, Evelyn Reed and Clifton DeBerry ran as alternates in Indiana, New York and Wisconsin.)	Andrew Pulley	66,679 (Note: 83,380 for Jenness-Pulley, of which 30,579 votes in Arizona due to ballot malfunction, yielding 52,801; and 13,878 for Reed-DeBerry.)	0.09%	0	Lost			
1968	Fred Halstead	Paul Boutelle	41,390	0.05%	0	Lost			
1964	Clifton DeBerry	Edward Shaw	32,327	0.05%	0	Lost			
1960	Farrell Dobbs	Myra Tanner Weiss	60,166	0.06%	0	Lost			
1956	Farrell Dobbs	Myra Tanner Weiss	7,797	0.01%	0	Lost			
1952	Farrell Dobbs	Myra Tanner Weiss	10,312	0.01%	0	Lost			
1948	Farrell Dobbs	Grace Carlson	13,614	0.01%	0	Lost			

=== Congressional elections ===
Year	Candidate	Chamber	State	District	Votes	%	Result	Notes	Ref
2012	David Rosenfeld	House	Iowa	3	6286	1.62%	Lost	ran as SWP candidate	
2012	Deborah Liatos	House	New York (state)	13	5548	2.88%	Lost	ran as SWP candidate	
2010	Rebecca Williamson	House	Iowa	3	6258	2.6%	Lost	ran as SWP candidate	
2010	Roger Calero	House	New York (state)	15	2647	2.33%	Lost	ran as SWP candidate	
2008	Sara Lobman	Senate	New Jersey	At-Large	9187	0.26%	Lost	ran as SWP candidate	
2008	Frank Forrestal	House	Iowa	3	4599	1.46%	Lost	ran as SWP candidate	
2008	Michael Taber	House	New Jersey	10	1848	1.08%	Lost	ran as SWP candidate	
2008	Martin Koppel	House	New York (state)	15	2141	1.08%	Lost	ran as SWP candidate	
2006	Angela Lariscy	Senate	New Jersey	At-Large	3433	0.15%	Lost	ran as SWP candidate	
2006	Roger Calero	Senate	New York (state)	At-Large	6967	0.16%	Lost	ran as SWP candidate	
2006	Helen Meyers	House	Iowa	3	3591	1.61%	Lost	ran as SWP candidate	
2006	Laura Garza	House	Massachusetts	8	12449	8.99%	Lost	ran as SWP candidate	
2006	Brian Williams	House	New Jersey	13	1049	1.05%	Lost	ran as SWP candidate	
2004	Edwin Fruit	Senate	Iowa	At-Large	1874	0.13%	Lost	ran as SWP candidate	
2004	Martin Koppel	Senate	New York (state)	At-Large	14811	0.22%	Lost	ran as SWP candidate	
2004	Sara Lobman	House	New Jersey	10	2089	1.3%	Lost	ran as SWP candidate	
2004	Angela Lariscy	House	New Jersey	13	887	0.56%	Lost	ran as SWP candidate	
2002	Edwin Fruit	House	Iowa	3	569	0.26%	Lost	ran as SWP candidate	
2000	Rebecca Ellis	Senate	Minnesota	At-Large	12956	0.54%	Lost	ran as SWP candidate	
2000	Nancy Rosenstock	Senate	New Jersey	At-Large	3309	0.11%	Lost	ran as SWP candidate	
2000	Jacob Perasso	Senate	New York (state)	At-Large	3040	0.04%	Lost	ran as SWP candidate	
2000	Sam Manuel	House	Washington, D.C.	At-Large	1419	0.81%	Lost	ran as SWP candidate	
2000	Edwin Fruit	House	Iowa	4	612	0.22%	Lost	ran as SWP candidate	
2000	Maurice Williams	House	New York (state)	10	536	0.35%	Lost	ran as SWP candidate	
2000	Kari Sachs	House	New Jersey	13	168	0.11%	Lost	ran as SWP candidate	
2000	Paul Pederson	House	New York (state)	12	1025	1.03%	Lost	ran as SWP candidate	

SWP has not fielded a candidate for Congress who achieved ballot access since 2012.

== Notable members ==
=== National Secretaries ===
- James P. Cannon (1938–1953)
- Farrell Dobbs (1953–1972)
- Jack Barnes (since 1972)

=== Notable current and former members ===
- Martin Abern
- Harry Braverman
- George Breitman
- Alice Brock
- James Burnham
- Peter Camejo
- Grace Carlson
- Joseph Carter
- Sylvia Callen
- Bert Cochran
- Jake Cooper
- Stephanie Coontz
- Oscar Coover
- Clifton DeBerry
- Farrell Dobbs
- Hal Draper
- Raya Dunayevskaya
- James T. Farrell
- Eric Flint
- Clara Fraser
- Richard Fraser
- Alan Gelfand
- Albert Goldman
- Joseph Hansen
- Sidney Hook
- C. L. R. James
- Martin Koppel
- Lyndon LaRouche
- Frank Lovell
- Sam Marcy
- Kathleen Mickells
- Paul Montauk
- Felix Morrow
- George Novack
- Evelyn Reed
- Harry Ring
- James Robertson
- Olga Rodriguez
- Max Shachtman
- Ed Shaw
- Carl Skoglund
- Morris Starsky
- Arne Swabeck
- Larry Trainor
- Mary-Alice Waters
- Eduard Limonov
- David Loeb Weiss
- Myra Tanner Weiss
- George Lavan Weissman
- Constance Weissman
- Herbert Hill
- David Thorstad

== See also ==
- History of the socialist movement in the United States
- Socialist Party of America
- Democratic Socialists of America
- Communist Party USA
- Socialist Equality Party (United States)
- Pathfinder Mural
