= American Workers Party =

American socialist party (1933-1934)

- Founded: December 1933
- Dissolved: December 1934
- Merged into: Workers Party of the United States
- Ideology: Marxism
- Political position: Far-left

The American Workers Party (AWP) was a socialist political party established in December 1933 by activists in the Conference for Progressive Labor Action, a group headed by A. J. Muste. The figurative leader of the AWP was Muste, but it had a structure and values that lent its far-left radicalism a highly democratic and collaborative quality.

== Actions ==
The AWP sought to find what it called "an American approach" for Marxism at the depth of the Great Depression. The group published a popularly-written newspaper, Labor Action, and created Unemployed Leagues, which attracted tens of thousands of members and should not be confused with the Communist Party USA's Unemployed Councils.

The AWP is best known in labor history for its leadership of the successful 1934 Toledo Auto-Lite Strike, which foreshadowed the creation of the United Auto Workers union. Exerting influence through its Unemployed League chapter, the AWP in Toledo kept the Auto-Lite strike from being broken by the desperate unemployed. Instead, the AWP brought the mass of unemployed to bear as a powerful vehicle for solidarity with the auto parts factory workers on the picket lines. The Auto-Lite strike, along with the Minneapolis Teamsters Strike of 1934 (led by the Trotskyist Communist League of America) and the 1934 West Coast Longshore Strike (led by the Communist Party USA), was an important catalyst for the rise of industrial unionism in the 1930s, much of which was organized through the Congress of Industrial Organizations.

While it never actually attracted any workers, numbering no more than a few hundred members, the AWP attracted a number of prominent labor activists, such as J. B. S. Hardman of the needle trades. It also attracted a number of intellectuals, many of them former members of the Communist Party who rebelled against its strictures but remained radical. The latter included James Burnham, Sidney Hook, James Rorty, and V. F. Calverton.

== Termination ==
In December 1934, the AWP merged with the Trotskyist Communist League of America, to form the Workers Party of the United States. That was the fusion of two revolutionary socialist organizations, which had both successfully led two militant strikes to victory. Most AWP members were absorbed into the mainstream Trotskyist movement, and some, like Burnham, became major figures in later 1930s.

A few others, such as Louis Budenz and Arnold Johnson, did not accept the rapprochement with Trotskyism and instead joined the Communist Party, considering its adoption of the Popular Front to be analogous to what the AWP had tried to accomplish with its "American approach."

Others, such as Hook and Rorty, became political independents but remained, for a time, largely sympathetic to the Workers Party of the United States.

== Sources ==
- Louis Budenz. This is My Story. McGraw-Hill, 1947.
- Margaret Budenz. Streets. Our Sunday Visitor, 1979.
- James P. Cannon. History of American Trotskyism. Pathfinder Press, 1944.
- Farrell Dobbs. Teamster Rebellion. Monad Press, 1972.
- Sidney Hook. Out of Step: An Unquiet Life in the Twentieth Century. Harper & Row, 1987.
- Christopher Phelps. Young Sidney Hook. Cornell University Press, 1997.
- JoAnn Ooiman Robinson. Abraham Went Out. Temple, 1981.
- Wald, Alan M. (1987). The New York Intellectuals: The Rise and Decline of the Anti-Stalinist Left from the 1930s to the 1980s. University of North Carolina Press. ISBN 0-8078-4169-2.
