= Charles C. Tansill =

American historian (1890–1964)

Charles Callan Tansill
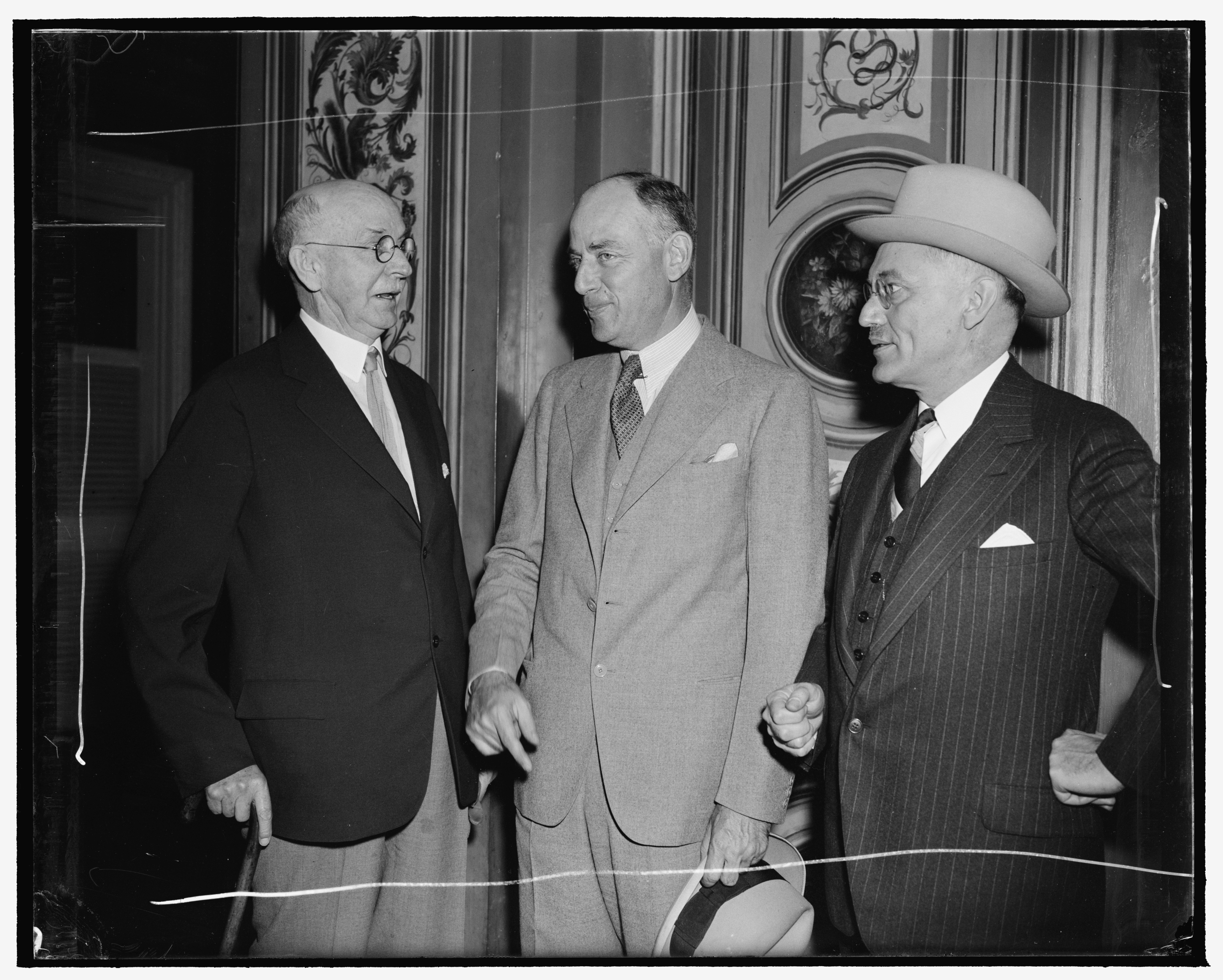
- Born: Charles Callan Tansill; December 9, 1890; Fredericksburg, Texas, U.S.
- Died: November 12, 1964 (aged 73); Washington, D.C., U.S.
- Resting place: Oak Hill Cemetery; Washington, D.C., U.S.
- Education: Catholic University of America (PhD); Johns Hopkins University (PhD)
- Occupation: Historian
- Spouse: Helen
- Children: 5

Charles Callan Tansill (December 9, 1890 – November 12, 1964) was an American historian and the author of fourteen history books. He was a professor of history at American University, Fordham University, and Georgetown University. An isolationist before World War II, he was accused of revisionism after the war.

== Early life ==
Tansill was born in 1890 in Fredericksburg, Texas. He received a bachelor's degree, followed by a master's degree and a PhD in history from the Catholic University of America. He received another PhD from Johns Hopkins University in 1918.

== Career ==
Tansill was assistant professor of history at the Catholic University of America and American University. He was full professor of American history at American University from 1921 to 1937. He became professor of history at Fordham University in 1939, up until 1944. He was Professor of History at Georgetown University from 1944 to 1957. Over the course of his academic career, he wrote fourteen history books.

Tansill worked as a historian for the United States Senate. In 1927, he edited Documents Illustrative of the Formation of the Union of the American States, published by the Library of Congress.

Tansill published America Goes to War, a history book about World War I, in 1938. The book was well received by his peers. For example, Thomas A. Bailey, a professor of history at Stanford University wrote in a review published in The Mississippi Valley Historical Review, "This lucidly written and thoroughly documented book is the most important that has yet appeared on American neutrality in 1914–1917." He finished his review by calling it, "a provocative and authoritative book, which should be on the "must list" of every student of the period." However, in a review for The Yale Law Journal, Frederick L. Schuman, a professor of political science at Williams College suggested Tansill failed to be objective in his isolationist stance. He argued, "In chapter headings, text, selection of facts, and emphasis, Tansill reveals his pro-German and anti-British bias and his conviction that German victory was preferable to American intervention."

In the 1930s, Tansill was a staunch isolationist, arguing that the United States should not participate in World War II. In 1937, Tansill lost his position at American University for his pro-Nazi views. The Washington Post described him as an "outspoken defender of Adolf Hitler and the Nazi Regime." During a speech to the United Daughters of the Confederacy and the Sons of Confederate Veterans in 1947, Tansill claimed that Abraham Lincoln was a "do-nothing" soldier and claimed that he had started the American Civil War by tricking the South into firing on Fort Sumter.

At the same time, he was an advisor to the United States Senate Committee on Foreign Relations. In 1952, Tansill published Back Door to War, a book about the war. According to A. S. Winston, Tansill, "blamed Franklin Roosevelt for forcing a peace-minded Hitler into war and used the standard Rudolph Hess line that Hitler wanted only a free hand to deal with Bolshevism in the East." Tansill went on to argue that it was Roosevelt who persuaded Neville Chamberlain to assure Poland that it would be defended by Britain if it was attacked by Germany, which happened in 1939 during the German invasion of Poland. Winston goes on to suggest, "The book became a foundation for revisionist history of World War II." These assertions were confirmed as facts by President Herbert Hoover based on his discussions with the American ambassador to the United Kingdom at the time, Joseph P. Kennedy Sr., and the diaries of the Under-Secretary of the Navy, James Forrestal in his book “Freedom Betrayed.”

In an article that he published in American Opinion, the journal of the John Birch Society, in 1963, a year before his death, Tansill suggested it would have made sense to impeach President John F. Kennedy after the latter suggested to the United Nations that the United States should disarm.

== Personal life ==
With his wife Helen, Tansill had five children. They resided in Washington, D.C..

== Death and legacy ==
Tansill died of a heart attack in 1964. He was seventy-three years old. He was buried at Oak Hill Cemetery in Washington, D.C.

== Bibliography ==
- The United States Navy in the Pacific, 1897-1909 (1919, The Macmillan Company)
- The United States and the War Debt Question (1925, The Macmillan Company)
- The United States, Venezuela, and the Monroe Doctrine (1925, The Macmillan Company)
- The United States and the Rivalry between Britain and Russia in Central Asia, 1829-1867 (1929, The Macmillan Company)
- The Purchase of the Danish West Indies (1932, The Macmillan Company)
- The Use of Territorial Waters for Military Purposes (1932, The Macmillan Company)
- The United States and Santo Domingo, 1798-1873 (1938, Russell & Russell)
- The United States in the Orient: The Nature of the Economic Problem (1940, The Macmillan Company)
- The Mexican and United States Free Trade Agreement (1943, Duke University Press)
- The United States and Canada (1943, Duke University Press)
- White and Yellow: The Negro's Place in Latin America (1947, Duke University Press)
- Back Door to War: The Roosevelt Foreign Policy, 1933-1941 (1952, Henry Regnery Company)
