= Labor Age =

Defunct monthly magazine

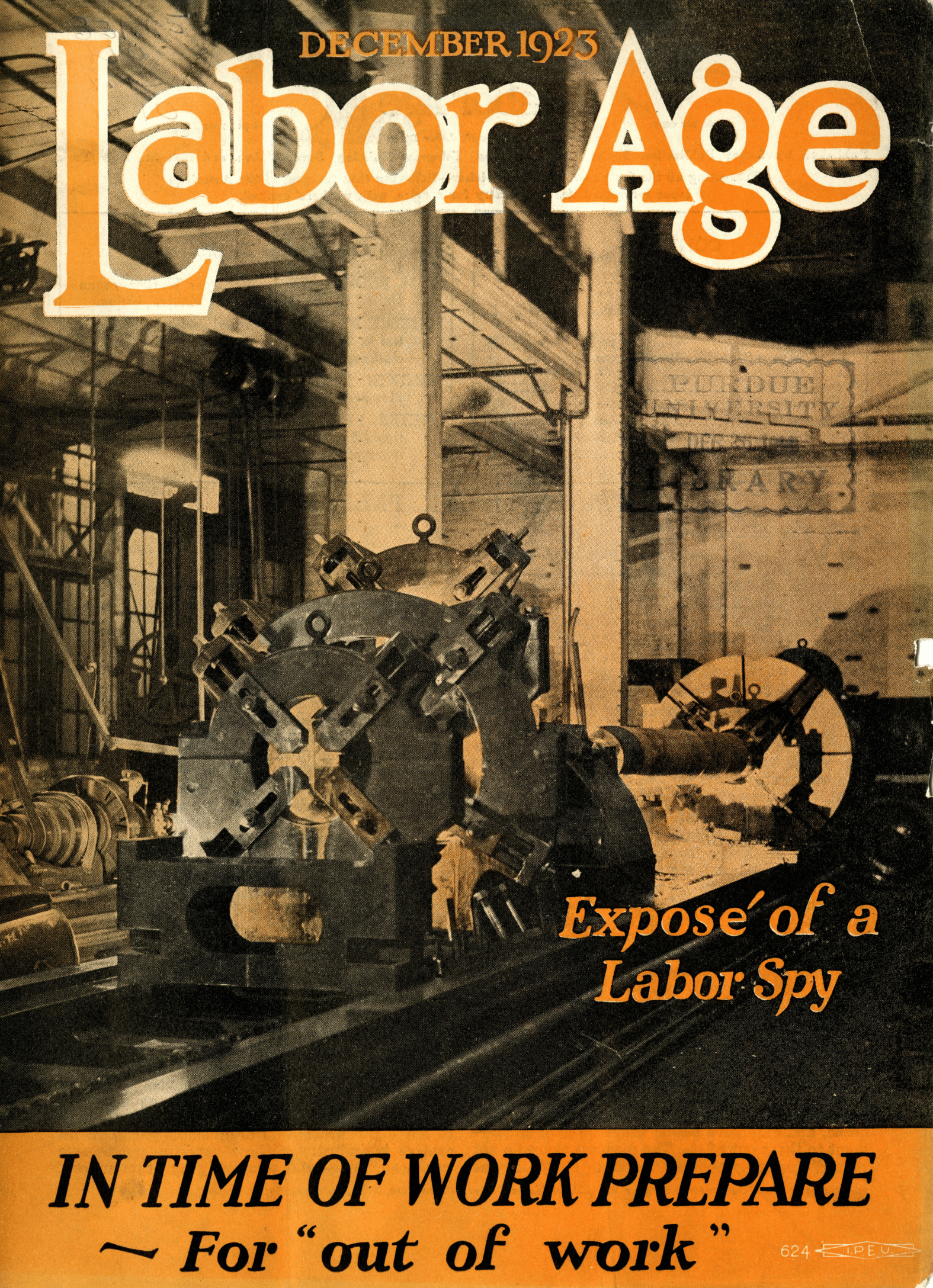
- December 1923, Labor Age Cover
- Type: Monthly Magazine
- Owner: Conference for Progressive Labor Action
- Founded: January 1922
- Ceased publication: March 1933
- Country: United States

Labor Age was a monthly political magazine published by the Labor Publication Society from 1922 to 1933.

== History ==
Labor Age succeeded the Socialist Review, journal of the Intercollegiate Socialist Society. It advocated industrial unionism, economic planning, and workers' education (especially the activities of Brookwood Labor College). It reported extensively on innovative tactics for organizing nonunion workers in mass production industries, identifying tactics that would become standard procedure for union organizers in the 1930s and 1940s.

The Socialist Review and Labor Age were the official publications of the League for Industrial Democracy from 1921 to 1929. In May 1929, the editors of Labor Age helped to form the Conference for Progressive Labor Action (CPLA) in order to counter what they considered growing pro-business tendencies in the American Federation of Labor.

In 1932, the CPLA voted to supplement the monthly Labor Age with a daily newspaper, called Labor Action, but that was never realized. Labor Age ceased publication after the February–March 1933 issue.

== Contributors ==
Important figures associated with Labor Age were A. J. Muste, James Maurer, Harry W. Laidler, Fannia Cohn, and Louis Budenz. Other contributors of the December 1931 issue included Judson King, Bruce Crawford, Benjamin Mandel, Sam Bakely, J. B. Matthews, Ludwig Lore, David J. Saposs, and Patrick L. Quinlan.

== See also ==
- Conference for Progressive Labor Action
- A.J. Muste

== Sources ==
- Jon Bloom and Paul Buhle, "Intercollegiate Socialist Society and Successors," in Encyclopedia of the American Left. Urbana: University of Illinois Press, 1990; pp. 362–363.
- Labor Age, 1922-1933, at Internet Archive
- Labor Age, 1922-1933 via the Marxists Internet Archive (full, complete and high resolution)
- Labor Age via HathiTrust Digital Library
