= Conference for Progressive Labor Action =

American political organization (1929–1933)

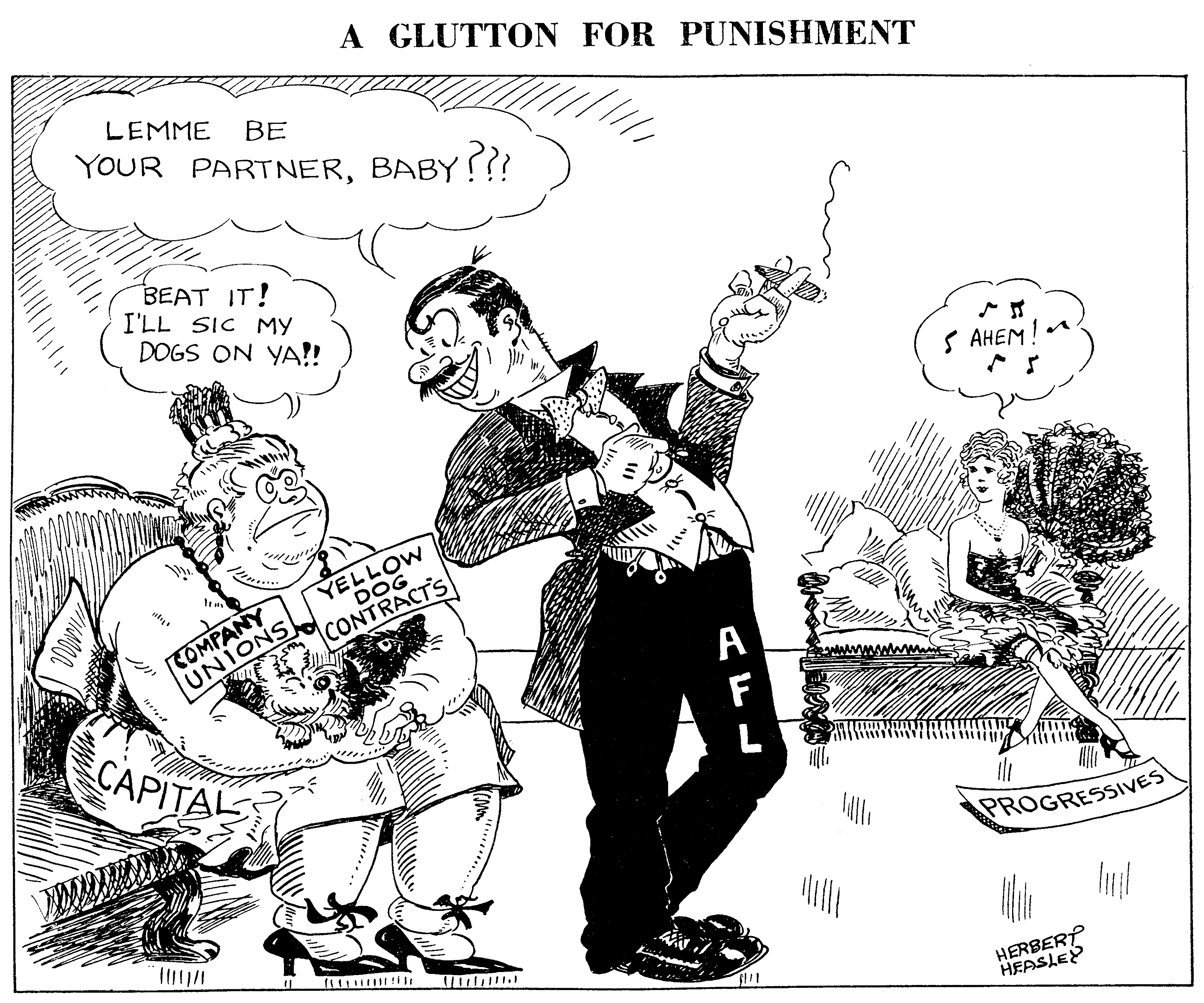
This cartoon from a CPLA monthly magazine illustrates its view of the AFL.

The Conference for Progressive Labor Action (CPLA) was a left-wing American political organization established in May 1929 by A. J. Muste, the director of Brookwood Labor College. The organization was established to promote industrial unionism and to work for reform of the American Federation of Labor. It dissolved itself in December 1933 to form the American Workers Party.

== Establishment ==
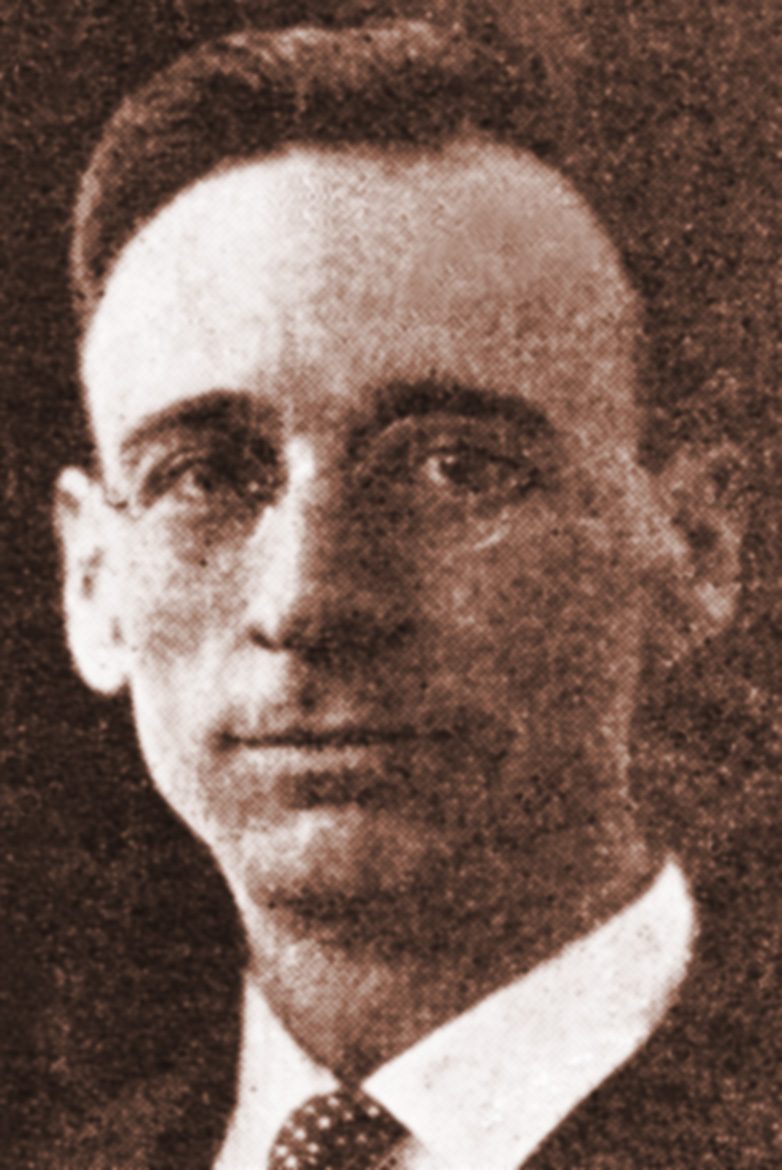
A.J. Muste, founder and chairman of the Conference for Progressive Labor Action

The CPLA was established by a group of activists in the trade union movement at a convention held in New York City on May 25 and 26, 1929. Those uniting into a common organization at the founding conference included the professional staff and activists of Brookwood Labor College, a workers' education society; the editorial staff of Labor Age magazine, a radical monthly; and members of an array of independent trade unions.

The primary force behind the new organization was A. J. Muste, a radical clergyman and committed pacifist. Muste had become active in the American trade union movement from his belief in the social gospel and its call for the application of Christian ethics to social problems and reduce poverty and suffering in the world. Muste had come to believe that the American Federation of Labor (AFL), an umbrella organization of more than 100 independent craft and industrial unions, was "hostile to genuine workers' education" and a fetter upon the growth of the power and scope of the American labor movement.

Muste outlined a program for militant progressive union activists in the pages of Labor Age, a New York monthly with which he was closely associated. In its February issue, that magazine opined that "honest, militant, progressive elements" in the American labor movement had no worthy option to the conservatism of the AFL and the extreme radicalism of the Communist Party USA and its trade union auxiliary, the Trade Union Unity League.

A new organization was sought to advance a radical agenda for the trade union movement, including the organization of the unorganized into industrial unions; exposure of the conservative, pro-business National Civic Federation with which conservative AFL leaders collaborated; an end to racial discrimination in the union movement; active work for unemployment insurance, health insurance, and old age pensions; and the development of "a labor party based on the mass organization of industrial workers."

A convention call was issued for a gathering to be held over the weekend of May 25 and 26, 1929, in New York City. The gathering was attended by 151 delegates, representing 33 unions in 18 states.

The constitution adopted by the founding conference, referred to as the CPLA's "Organizational Plan", specified that the purpose of the new group was "to carry on research, educational work, and agitation among the workers, both organized and unorganized in industry and agriculture, in order to stimulate in the existing and potential labor organizations a progressive, realistic, militant labor spirit and activity...." Membership was open to any individual who belonged to a labor or farm organization and was "in agreement with the aims of the association and desirous of actively forwarding its purposes" or members of fully affiliated unions.

The headquarters for the CPLA were established at 104 Fifth Avenue, New York City, June 15, 1929.

== Development ==
Israel Mufson, one of two joint CPLA Executive Secretaries as it formed in 1929

Although the CPLA was made up of individual members of the AFL, it had no direct membership status in it. Its criticism of the AFL's leader, William Green, and leadership cut both ways, as the Executive Council of that trade union body was quick to denounce the CPLA as a dual union. That criticism drew an official response from Muste in a July 23, 1929 statement that declared the CPLA was "not a dual union or federation of labor" and criticized the Communist Party for its attempt to form a "disruptive" communist trade union center, which he deemed "totally out of accord with the needs of the workers in America today."

The official magazine of the CPLA, Labor Age, reiterated its bitter disappointment with the Communist Party's performance in a June 1929 article:

The Communists, presented with a golden opportunity for service to the workers [by the lethargic performance of the official AFL] have miserably muffed the ball. They have aroused the unorganized in Passaic and Gastonia; but they have given no promise of leaving anything permanent to them, and they have resorted to a campaign of vituperation and strikebreaking that is not helpful to progress, to say the least. It is only a matter of time until they pass out of the picture, torn asunder by naive doctrinaire differences.

At the time of its launch, the CPLA was governed by a 26-member National Executive Committee, which elected Muste as its chairman and James H. Maurer and Carl Holderman as its vice-chairmen. Day-to-day operations were conducted by a pair of Executive Secretaries: Louis F. Budenz and Israel Mufson.

A local unit of the CLPA was known as a "branch". In 1929, branches were formed in 13 cities clustered in the Northeastern United States, including in New York City, Chicago, Boston, Cleveland, Detroit, Pittsburgh, Philadelphia, Buffalo, Bridgeport, and New Haven.

The CPLA held periodic conferences and educational seminars, including a gathering over Labor Day in 1930 in Katonah, New York. The gatherings concentrated discussion on practical matters of labor organization, such as the situation facing organizers in the South, developments in the United Mine Workers Union and the steelworkers, studies of the development and effects of the Great Depression, and the problems facing black and female workers.

The group published a flurry of pamphlets that publicized it and its perspectives, and it circulated 50,000 copies of a single leaflet in 1930, Insure Your Pay. The CPLA also sent speakers into the field to speak to various union gatherings, workers groups, college classes, and public forums. The group also attempted to mobilize unemployed workers by speaking before thousands at New York City's Free Municipal Employment Bureau.

== Left turn ==
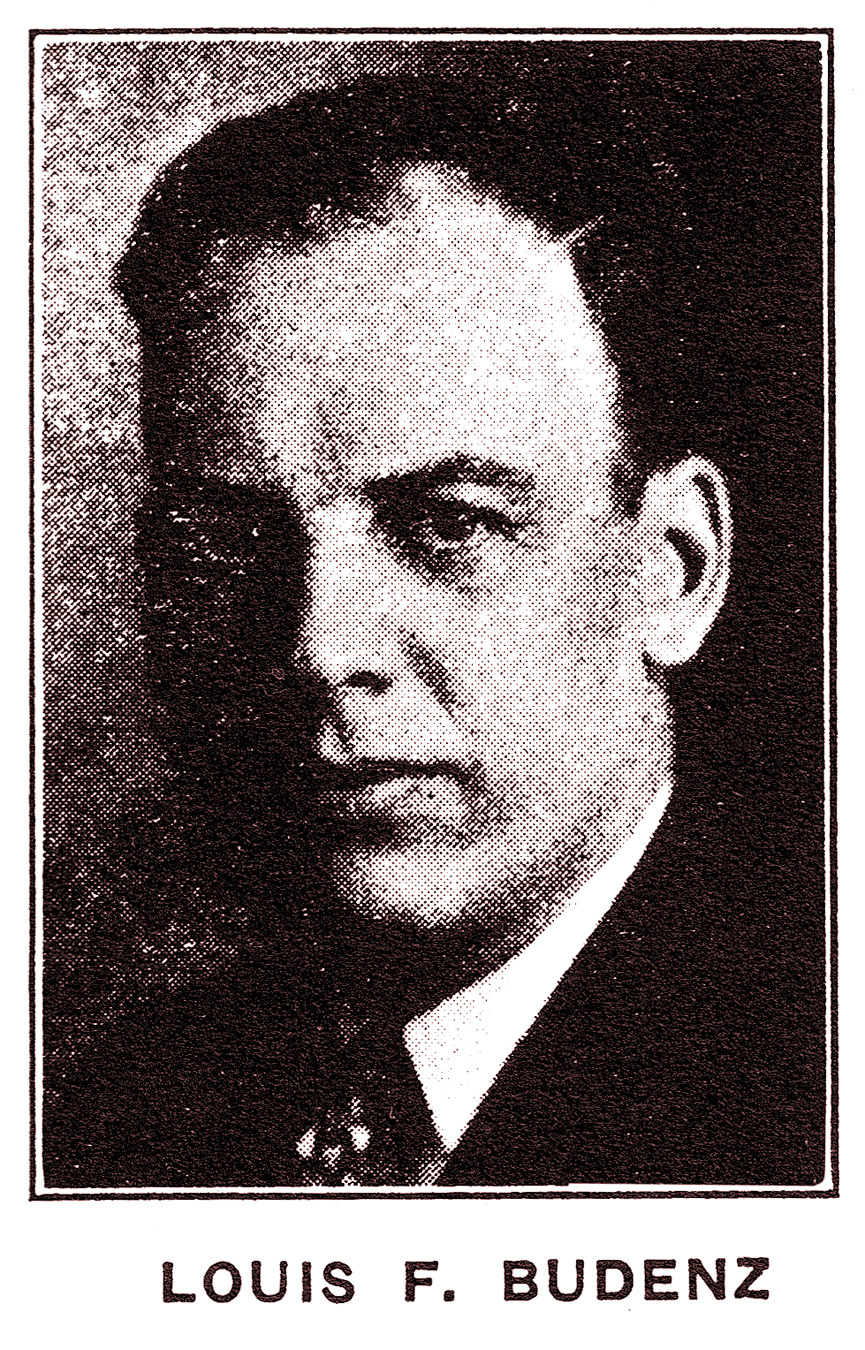
Louis F. Budenz, one of two joint CPLA Executive Secretaries as it formed in 1929

Although the CPLA was extremely close to the Socialist Party of America during its first two years of existence, including such prominent party leaders and Norman Thomas, James H. Maurer, and James Oneal among its ranks, the National Executive Committee declared its dissatisfaction with both Socialist and Communist Parties in 1931. The Socialist Party was singled out for particular criticism for not having "a clear working class orientation":

[The Socialist Party] has not, as a matter of fact, succeeded in winning the confidence of American workers. Some of its exponents have publicly abandoned Marxism as a labor philosophy, and have no philosophy to offer in its place. Others profess to retain Marxism but exhibit no militancy in carrying on the class struggle. It pursues a policy of 'neutrality' toward the trade unions which in practice amounts to leaving them in the hands of the bureaucrats and corruptionists.... It has lacked vigor and aggressiveness in supporting, inspiring, and leading efforts to organize the masses of unskilled and semi-skilled workers in the basic industries.... It is confused and at times distinctly antagonistic in its attitude toward Soviet Russia. It is not aggressive and militant in the struggle against militarism. It is not out and out Socialist, neither has it yet demonstrated that it can be an effective left-progressive American party.

That was a left turn for the organization despite its continued distrust and ideological distance by the Communist Party USA and its trade union auxiliary. In April 1931, CPLA Chairman Muste declared the Communists' Third Period obsession with forming exclusively-communist independent unions and "exercising a minute party dictatorship" over them as "utterly unsuited to such periods as the present and obviously suicidal."

Despite its political aspirations, the CPLA remained focused on the labor movement in 1931 and worked hand in glove with Alexander Howat in support of a dissident Reorganized United Mine Workers Union. When Illinois officials of that union decided to return to the old organization, headed by John L. Lewis, the CPLA intensified its effort to assist Howat and his associates with the organization of its own convention in St. Louis, which began on April 15, 1931. That effort did not succeed in building a lasting "rank and file union", however.

The CPLA was also active from January to March 1931 in assisting in the organization of coal miners in West Virginia's Kanawha Valley mine fields. CPLA organizers sent to the region included Muste, Tom Tippett, and Katherine Pollack. The organization continued to co-operate with the West Virginia Mine Workers Union after the conclusion of the strike.

In the summer of 1931, the organization also worked Paterson, New Jersey, with silkworkers who were members of independent unions that merged with the United Textile Workers, in the AFL. The CPLA also maintained a permanent organizer in the field who attempted to organize textile workers in the Southeast.

The call for a new political party by the CPLA leadership began to grow in 1931, with Muste authoring a lengthy April 1931 article, calling for formation of a new political party. Six necessary characteristics were enumerated by Muste: the new organization must be organized "on a class basis" and "out to do away with the present capitalist economy" and upon the "organization of the workers upon the economic field into industrial unions." Furthermore, Muste declared that the new organization needed to offer a "sound view of Soviet Russia", with a demand for diplomatic recognition, to recognize the limitations of parliamentary action, and to "be realistic" and to "grow out of the American soil."

== Termination ==
Gradually, the CPLA came to see itself less as a cheerleader for a new independent labor party and more as the kernel of a political party itself. While averring that the CPLA did not contemplate "putting up candidates, etc.", Muste nonetheless announced in 1932 that the group sought "a more closely knit and disciplined membership than was formerly the case." According to Muste, the CPLA sought to forge cooperative partnerships with other organizations in establishing "a genuinely militant left-wing political group in the United States."

Despite having had at least seven educational and political conferences over the first three years of its existence, the CPLA did not hold its "1st Official Convention" until the Labor Day weekend of September 1932. The convention call specified:

The convention will adopt a permanent name and a constitution for this organization of militants. It will determine policies and map out programs for industrial organization in the basic industries, progressive activities in the unions, work among the unemployed, the building of a mass labor party, agitation for unity in the American labor movement, and for building up the CPLA itself as a rallying center for militants who desire to serve in an effective vanguard for American labor.

No procedure for the systematic selection of delegates was specified but rather "existing political or propagandist groups which are in agreement with CPLA aims and methods are invited to correspond with the NEC in regard to attendance and representation at the convention."

Delegates attending the convention represented 20 CPLA branches in 8 states as well as representatives of trade unions, purporting to represent 40,000 workers. The gathering voted to replace the CPLA's monthly magazine, Labor Age, with a new weekly newspaper to be called Labor Action. A new set of officers was elected, including Muste as chairman and a 22-member National Executive Committee.

The organization was forthright in its objectives, with Muste declaring that "the CPLA aims to abolish capitalism, not to reform it, and to build a workers' republic and a planned economic system operated by and for the workers." The group remained unwilling to declare itself a political party, however, with Muste maintaining a union-oriented perspective, asserting that "members will work within existing economic organizations."

The evolution of the CPLA into its successor organization, the American Workers Party, had begun, which culminated in December 1933 with the establishment of the new party.

== Conventions ==
Convention	Location	Date	Notes
Organizational Conference	New York City	May 25–29, 1929	Attended by 151 delegates from 18 states.
Educational Conference	Katonah, New York	Aug. 30–Sept. 2, 1929	Attended by 150 participants, another 40 turned away.
First 1930 Conference	New York City	March 16–17, 1930	
Second 1930 Conference	New York City	December 6–7, 1930	
1931 Conference	Katonah, New York	September 5–7, 1931	Attended by "over 100 CPLA members and sympathizers."
Active Workers' Conference	New York City	March 19–20, 1932	
Textile Workers' Conference		(date?) 1932	
"1st Official Convention"	New York City	September 3–5, 1932	

== Prominent members ==
- Leonard Bright
- Louis F. Budenz
- J.M. Budish
- Frank Crosswaith
- Winston Dancis
- Justus Ebert
- Nathan Fine
- Francis J. Gorman
- J.B.S. Hardman
- Mary Hillyer
- Carl Holderman
- Andrew J. Kennedy
- John C. Kennedy
- Abraham Lefkowitz
- Algernon Lee
- Ludwig Lore
- Benjamin Mandel (as Bert Miller)
- J.B. Matthews
- James H. Maurer
- Israel Mufson
- A.J. Muste
- Harvey O'Connor
- James Oneal
- Frank L. Palmer
- David J. Saposs
- Nathaniel Spector
- Norman Thomas
- Tom Tippett

== Publications ==
Labor Age became the CPLA's main publication from 1929 to 1933.

The official organ of the CPLA was the monthly magazine Labor Age, which was succeeded in January 1933 by a newspaper, Labor Action that was the official organ of the successor, the American Workers Party.

Pamphlets published by the CPLA include:

- What is the Conference for Progressive Labor Action? A Statement of Policy. New York: Labor Publication Society, n.d. [c. 1929].
- Francis J. Gorman; Tom Tippett; and A.J. Muste, The Marion Murder: The Story of the Tragic Day of October 2, 1929: Funeral Addresses. New York: Conference for Progressive Labor Action, 1929.
- A.J. Muste, Why a Labor Party — And the Folly of the Non-Partisan Policy. New York: Conference for Progressive Labor Action, 1929.
- One Year of CPLA. New York: Conference for Progressive Labor Action, n.d. [c. 1930].
- Abram Lincoln Harris, The Negro Worker: A Problem of Concern to the Entire Labor Movement. New York: National Executive Committee of the Conference for Progressive Labor Action, 1930.
- Jessie Lloyd O'Connor, Gastonia: A Graphic Chapter in Southern Organization. New York: National Executive Committee of the Conference for Progressive Labor Action, 1930.
- Jame Oneal and J.B.S. Hardman, Why Unions Go Smash! : Certain Dangerous Trends in American Trade Unionism and What is to be Done. New York: National Executive Committee of the Conference for Progressive Labor Action, 1930.
- Labor's Share in the Late Lamented Prosperity: Analyzing How Much of the Good Things Trickle Down to Labor. New York: National Executive Committee, Conference for Progressive Labor Action, 1930.
- The Call to Action: 2nd year of CPLA: A Short Review of the Origin, Purposes, and Activities of the Conference for Progressive Labor Action. New York: Conference for Progressive Labor Action, n.d. [c. 1931].
- A.J. Muste, The AF of L in 1931. New York: Conference for Progressive Labor Action, n.d. [1931].
- Louis F. Budenz (ed.), Labor Age Cartoons. New York: Conference for Progressive Labor Action, 1932.
- John C. Kennedy, Ending the Depression. New York: National Executive Committee of the Conference for Progressive Labor Action, n.d. [c. 1932].
- A.J. Muste and Louis F. Budenz, CPLA at Work. New York: Conference of Progressive Labor Action, 1932.
- CPLA: Program, Policies. New York: National Executive Committee of the Conference for Progressive Labor Action, n.d. [c. 1932].

== See also ==
- League for Independent Political Action

== Sources ==
- William Z. Foster, Little Brothers of the Big Labor Fakers: Report of a Speech against the Conference for Progressive Labor Action, Made in New Star Casino, New York City on May 10, 1931. New York: Trade Union Unity League, 1931.
