= Louis F. Budenz =

American activist and writer (1891–1972)

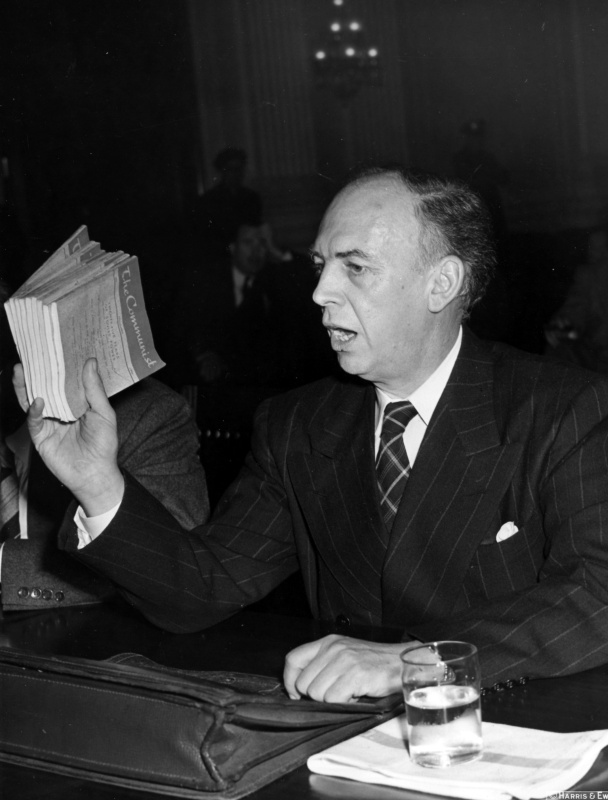
- Budenz testifies before the House Un-American Activities Committee, 1946
- Born: Louis Francis Budenz; July 17, 1891; Indianapolis, Indiana, U.S.
- Died: April 27, 1972 (aged 80); Newport, Rhode Island, U.S.
- Occupations: Espionage, later anti-Communism, writer
- Spouse: Margaret

Louis Francis Budenz (pronounced "byew-DENZ"; July 17, 1891 – April 27, 1972) was an American activist and writer. He began as a labor activist and became a member of the Communist Party USA. In 1945, Budenz renounced Communism and became a vocal anti-Communist, appearing as an expert witness at governmental hearings and writing about his experiences.

== Background ==
Budenz was born on July 17, 1891, in Indianapolis, Indiana, a grandson of German and Irish immigrants, being raised on the Southside in a mostly German and Irish Catholic neighborhood around Fountain Square.

He attended St. John's Catholic High School in Indianapolis, Xavier University in Cincinnati, and St. Mary's College in Topeka, Kansas, before receiving his LL.B. from Indianapolis Law School in 1912.

== Career ==
=== Labor supporter ===
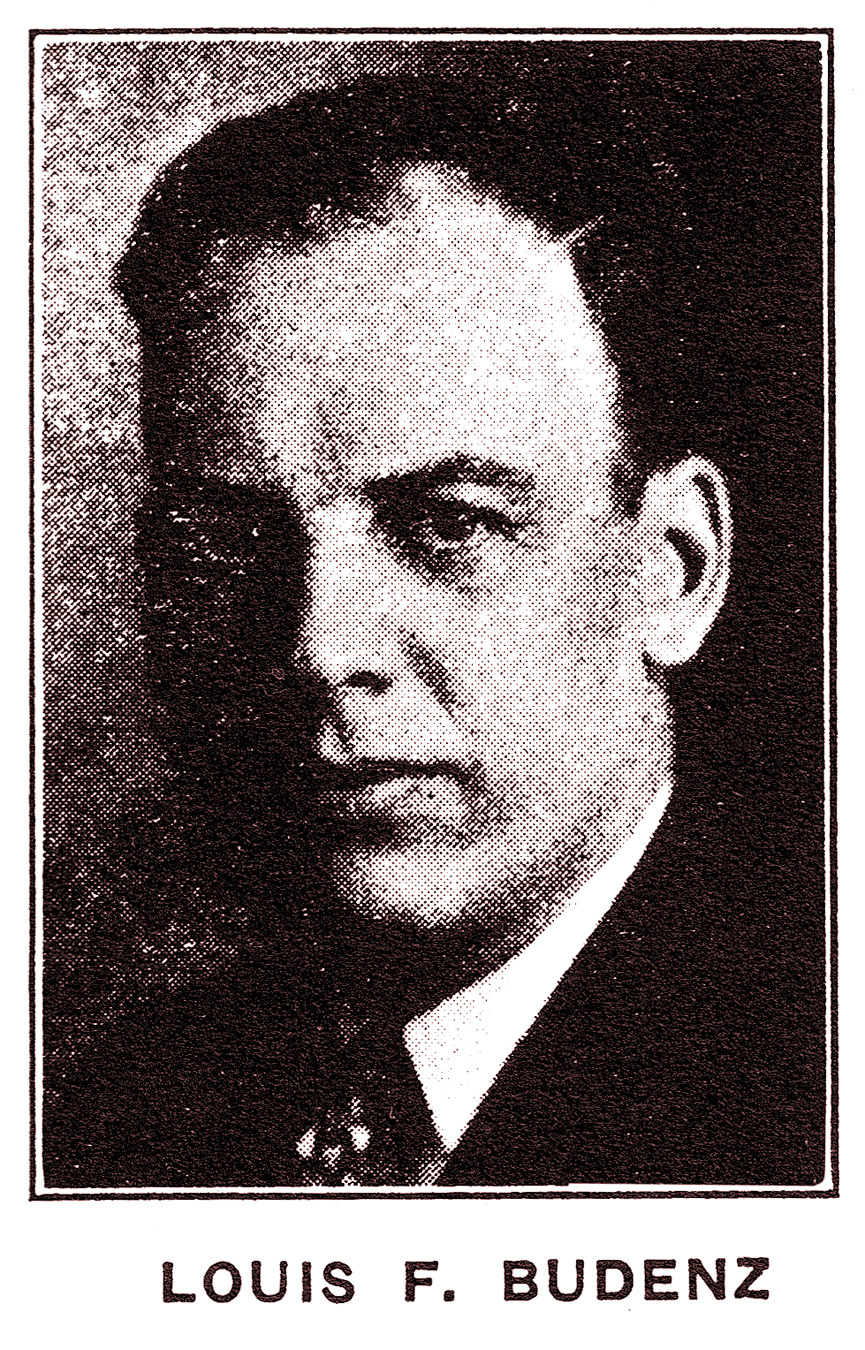
Budenz in 1929, as Executive Secretary of the Conference for Progressive Labor Action

Budenz's role in the labor movement began from a Catholic perspective. In 1915, working with the Central Bureau of the Roman Catholic Central Verein, a reform-minded and social justice-oriented organization in St. Louis, he published A List of Books for the Study of the Social Question: Being an Introduction to Catholic Social Literature.

In 1920, Budenz moved to Rahway, New Jersey, where he worked for the ACLU (NY) as publicity director. In 1924 and into the early 1930s, Budenz was managing editor of the monthly magazine Labor Age. He advised striking workers at a hosiery mill in Kenosha, Wisconsin, in 1928; at a silk workers' strike Paterson, New Jersey, in 1930; and the Toledo Auto-Lite strike in 1934. He taught labor organizing and strike management at Brookwood Labor College outside New York City.

In the inaugural issue of the Monthly Bulletin of the International Juridical Association (May 1932), the name Budenz appears as "a lawyer from Rahway, N.J." He had been distributing leaflets against Yellow dog contracts, a topic of that issue under the broader topic of "free speech."

In 1934, he served as national secretary for A. J. Muste's Conference for Progressive Labor Action (which later became the American Workers Party).

=== Communist ===
In 1935, Budenz joined the Communist Party, continued to organize labor strikes, and became managing editor of the Party's Daily Worker newspaper. He became a member of the National Committee of the Party.

By 1938, he had been arrested on more than 20 occasions. That same year, he became editor of a new Communist daily in Chicago, the Midwest Daily Record, part of a "cross-country alliance of Communist dailies, between the San Francisco People's World ... and New York City's ... Daily Worker", at a time when there were more than 700 labor papers in America.

=== Anti-Communist ===
In 1945, Budenz renounced Communism, returned to the Roman Catholic Church under the guidance of Bishop Fulton Sheen, and became an anti-communist advocate.

Formerly the author of numerous articles and pamphlets in support of Communist causes, after 1945 Budenz wrote several books relating his criticisms and antipathy towards Communism. He became a professor of economics at the University of Notre Dame and later taught at Fordham University, in addition to working as a syndicated columnist and lecturer. In 1947, he wrote an autobiography, This Is My Story.

==== Paid expert witness ====
From 1946, Budenz began to testify about Communists such as Gerhart Eisler (former husband of Soviet spy Hede Massing, who would testify in the second trial of the Hiss Case).

Budenz became a paid informant for the FBI (like Elizabeth Bentley and unlike Whittaker Chambers). He testified as an expert witness at trials of Communists and before many of the Senate and House committees that were formed to investigate Communists. He voluntarily confessed that he had participated in espionage and other efforts on behalf of the Soviet Union, including discussion of the assassination of Leon Trotsky with CPUSA chairman Earl Browder.

A day after "Confrontation Day" (August 25, 1948) in the Hiss Case, Budenz testified before the HCOUA that the Communist Party "regarded him always" ("him" being Alger Hiss) as a party member and "under Communist discipline." He also corroborated Chambers's claim that Lee Pressman, John Abt, and Nathan Witt were party members.

By his own estimate, Budenz spent some 3,000 hours explaining the Party's "inner workings" to the FBI, as well as testifying on 33 occasions to different committees. By 1957, he estimated he had earned approximately $70,000 for his expert testimony. Budenz was a witness at the 1949 trial in Dennis v. United States, the Smith Act prosecution of Eugene Dennis, General Secretary of CPUSA, and ten other CPUSA leaders. He was a key witness in the 1950 hearings before the Tydings Committee, which had been called to investigate charges made by Senator Joseph McCarthy that the State Department had numerous Soviet moles in its ranks.

==== Lattimore testimonies ====
In the 1950 Tydings Committee hearings, Budenz testified that Owen Lattimore, one of the so-called "China Hands", was a member of a Communist cell within the Institute of Pacific Relations but not a Soviet agent. The reliability of his testimony was questioned because, in all of his 3,000 hours of debriefing before the FBI (1946–1949), Budenz had never mentioned Lattimore's name. In 1951, Budenz once more testified against Lattimore, this time before the hearings of the Senate Internal Security Subcommittee, headed by Senator Pat McCarran. During this second testimony against Lattimore, Budenz claimed Lattimore was both a Soviet agent and secret Communist.

At one point in the late 1940s he testified, according to one account, "that the fact that a man denied he was a Communist might prove he was a communist since all Communists had instructions to deny it."

==== McCarthy summation ====
In 1952, Senator McCarthy praised Budenz for having "testified in practically every case in which Communists were either convicted or deported over the past three years; one of the key witnesses who testified against... Communist leaders."

In his 1953 book Techniques of Communism, Budenz wrote a subsection on Professor Frederick L. Schuman in a chapter on "Affecting Public Opinion." Budenz asserted that Schuman was a CPUSA member in the 1930s and 1940s. Citing Eugene Lyons' 1941 book Red Decade, Budenz asserted that Schuman had supported CPUSA head William Z. Foster's bid for the US presidency (1932), traveled to and lectured in the USSR (1933–4), extolled US-USSR friendship at a Carnegie Hall gala (1936), called for closer Soviet ties in an open letter in the Daily Worker (1939), and supported alleged Soviet spy Gerhart Eisler (1946). He cites several books by Schuman as being subversive: American Policy Toward Russia Since 1917, American Politics at Home and Abroad (error for Soviet Politics at Home and Abroad?), and The Commonwealth of Man. He also listed "Communist fronts" to which Schuman belong. In sum, Budenz claimed, Schuman had "done tremendous damage" to the US. (Budenz also notes that Schuman had attacked ex-communists who had testified for the US government, "particularly Whittaker Chambers, Louis Budenz, and Elizabeth Bentley.")

== Personal life and death ==
Budenz married Gizella Geiss in 1916 in Terre Haute, Indiana. Louis and Gizella adopted a daughter in 1919 named Louise (born in 1917). Louis, wife Gizella and daughter Louise, moved to Rahway, NJ in 1920 where Louis worked for the ACLU (NY). Louis and Gizella were separated in 1931 and divorced in 1938.

Budenz married his second wife Margaret Rodgers of Pittsburgh, by whom he had four daughters: Julia, Josephine, Justine and Joanna.

Louis Francis Budenz died age 80 on April 27, 1972, at Newport Hospital in Newport, Rhode Island.

== Legacy ==
At time of death, Time magazine wrote of Budenz:

"A Catholic-educated Midwesterner, Budenz became sympathetic to the working class and involved himself in the labor movement of the 1920s. In 1935 he joined the Communist Party and within five years was managing editor of the Daily Worker. He became disillusioned, he said, when he 'learned the truth concerning the Communist conspiracy against America and Catholicism,' and in 1945 he renounced the party to rejoin the Catholic Church. Later he was frequently called as a witness in trials of accused Communists, and he appeared often before Senator Joseph McCarthy's investigating committee.

Providence College in Providence, Rhode Island houses Budenz's papers.

== Works ==
Communist period:

- Catholic priests distinguished Protestants have known: historical facts vs. uncritical calumny. St. Louis, Mo., Central bureau of the Roman Catholic central verein 1915
- A list of books for the study of the social question, being an introduction to Catholic social literature St. Louis, Mo., Central bureau of the Roman Catholic central verein 1915
- Labor Age cartoons (New York: s.n., 1932)
- Red baiting: enemy of labor; with a letter to Homer Martin by Earl Browder New York : Workers Library Publishers, 1937 (with Earl Browder)
- May Day, 1937: what it means to you New York : Workers Library Publishers, 1937
- May Day, 1940 New York : Workers Library Publishers, 1940
- Save your union!: the meaning of the 'Anti-Trust' persecution of labor New York : Workers Library Publishers, 1940

Anti-Communist period:

- This Is My Story. New York, London, Whittlesey House, McGraw-Hill Book Co., 1947
- Men without Faces: The Communist Conspiracy in the U. S. A. (1950)
- The communist conspiracy : a Harding College Freedom Forum presentation [Searcy, Ark.] : National Education Program, 1951
- The cry is peace. Chicago, Henry Regnery Company, 1952
- The techniques of communism Chicago, Henry Regnery Company, 1954
- What every citizen can do for the good of his country: attack communism! New York: American Business Consultants 1963
- The Bolshevik invasion of the West; account of the great political war for a Soviet America. [Linden, N.J.] Bookmailer 1966
