= CPLA =

CPLA may refer to:

- Chinese People's Liberation Army
- Conference for Progressive Labor Action, defunct American political organization
- Cordillera People's Liberation Army, defunct Filipino militant organization
- Crystallised polylactic acid
