= David J. Saposs =

American historian

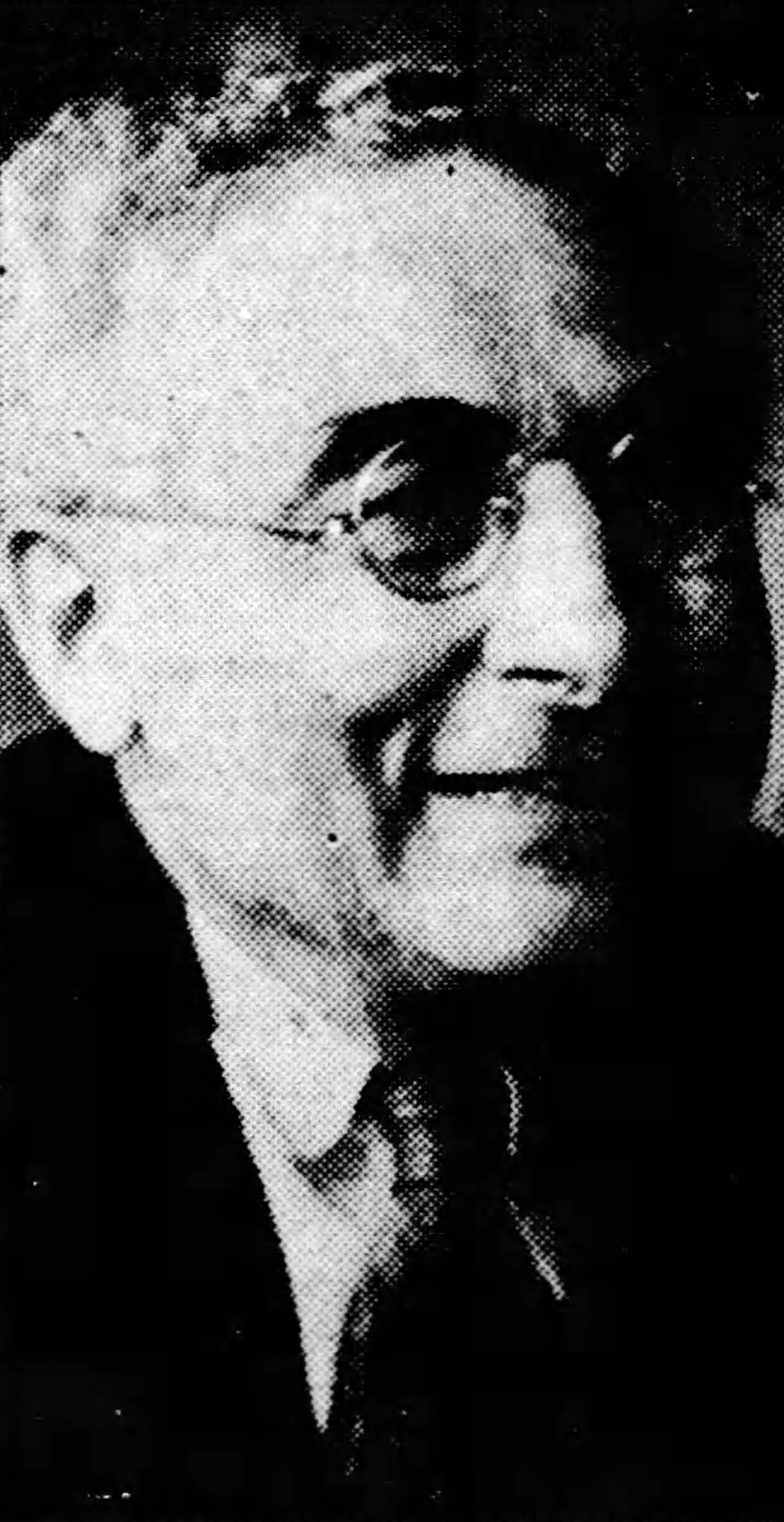
- Saposs c. 1938
- Born: David Joseph Saposs; February 22, 1886; Kiev, Kiev Governorate, Russian Empire (now Ukraine)
- Died: November 13, 1968 (aged 82); Washington, D.C., U.S.
- Occupations: Economist, historian, educator
- Known for: NLRB economist
- Spouse: Bertha Tigay
- Parents: Isaac Saposnik (father); Shima Erevsky (mother)

David Joseph Saposs (February 22, 1886 – November 13, 1968) was a 20th-century American economist, labor historian, and civil servant, best known as chief economist of the National Labor Relations Board (1935–1940).

== Background ==
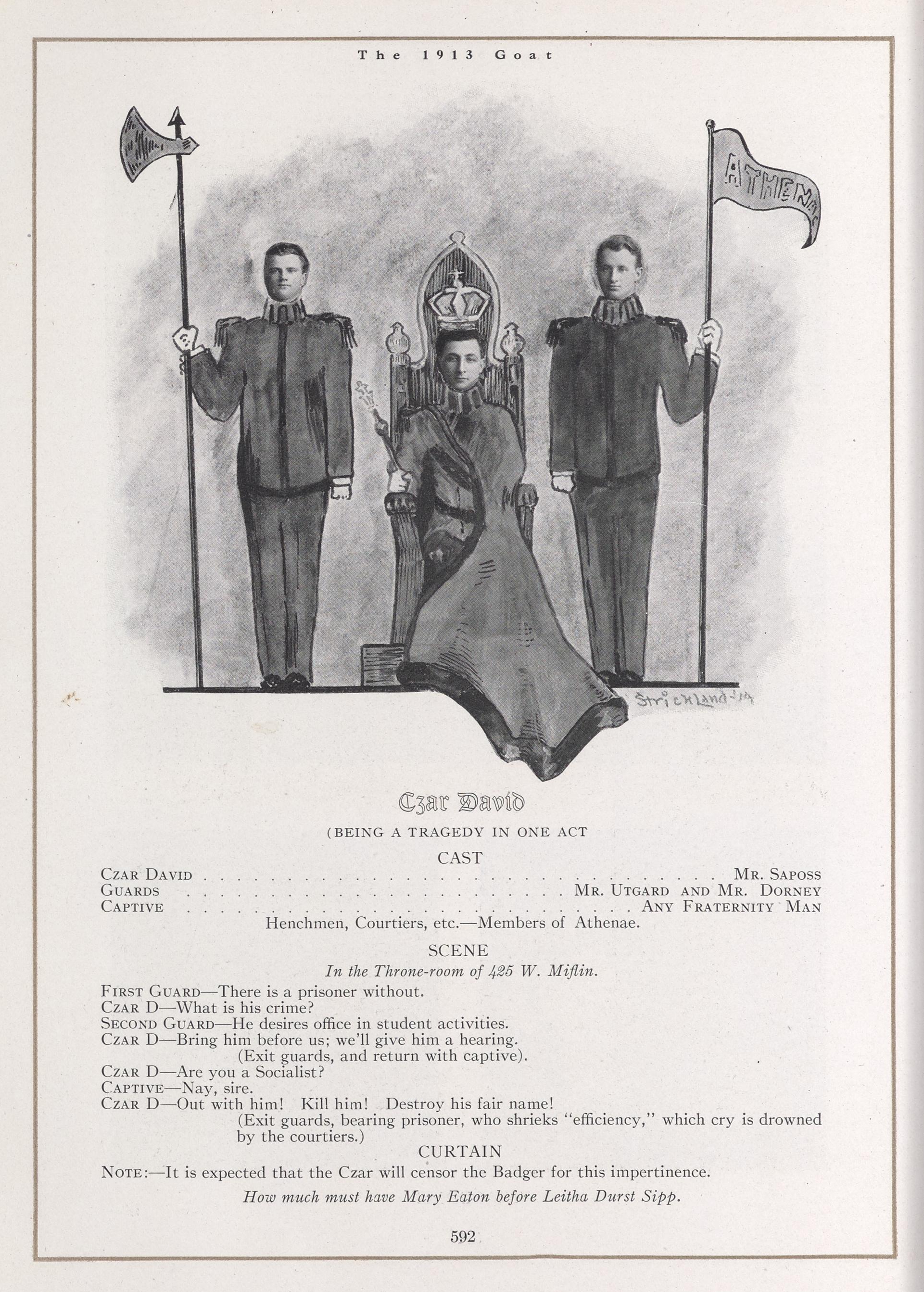
Czar David (Being a Tragedy in One Act), a satirical article making fun of Saposs as chairman of the Socialist Club at the University of Wisconsin–Madison, 1913

David Saposnik was born on February 22, 1886, in the city of Kyiv in the Russian Empire. His parents were Isaac Saposnik, a peddler, and Shima Erevsky. In 1895, the family emigrated to the United States and shortened their name to Saposs. The Jewish family settled in Milwaukee, Wisconsin. In 1900, he quit school after fifth grade and worked in beer breweries (including the Blatz and Schlitz brewing companies) in his teens to help support his family. In 1906, at the age of 20, he was elected shop steward for the local Brewery Workers' Union.

Although he lacked a high school diploma, Saposs was admitted in 1907 to the University of Wisconsin (UW). He graduated in 1911, and enrolled part-time in the graduate program at UW. He enrolled full-time beginning in 1913, and graduated with a Ph.D. in economics in 1915. While in the doctoral program at Wisconsin, Saposs was chairman of the university's Socialist Club, a student of the nationally known labor economist John R. Commons, and a close friend of fellow student Selig Perlman (who later became a nationally known labor economist in his own right).

== Career ==
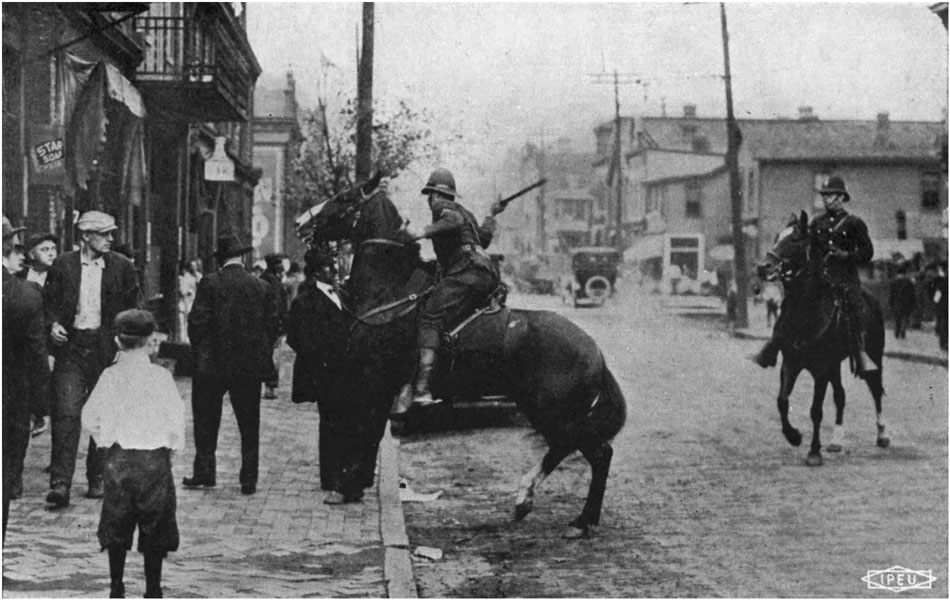
Saposs covered the Steel strike of 1919 (here, mounted state police threatening to strike in Homestead, Pennsylvania)

Saposs worked in a variety of positions over the next few years. He was an accident prevention investigator for the New York Department of Labor, an investigator into the role immigrants played in American labor unions for the Carnegie Corporation, investigated the Steel strike of 1919 on behalf of the Inter-Church World Movement Commission, and served as Educational Director for the Amalgamated Clothing Workers Union.

In 1920, he became an economic consultant to the Labor Bureau, Inc. (founded by George Henry Soule Jr. along with Evans Clark and Alfred L. Bernheim) through 1922.

In 1922, Saposs was appointed an instructor at Brookwood Labor College. In 1924, he started post-graduate work in economics and labor history at Columbia University. At Columbia, he became close friends with William Morris Leiserson, later a colleague at the National Labor Relations Board (NLRB). He ended his post-graduate work at Columbia after two years without obtaining an additional degree. Columbia University was embarking on a major study of socio-economic conditions in France, and asked Saposs to lead the study of labor conditions there. Saposs agreed to do so, and moved to France to conduct the study for the next two years.

In 1934, Saposs became research director for the Twentieth Century Fund's newly founded labor unit and remained an associate there through 1945.

In 1935, Saposs became a research consultant to the United States Department of Labor (USDOL), for whom he wrote a report on company unions.

=== NLRB and other federal positions ===
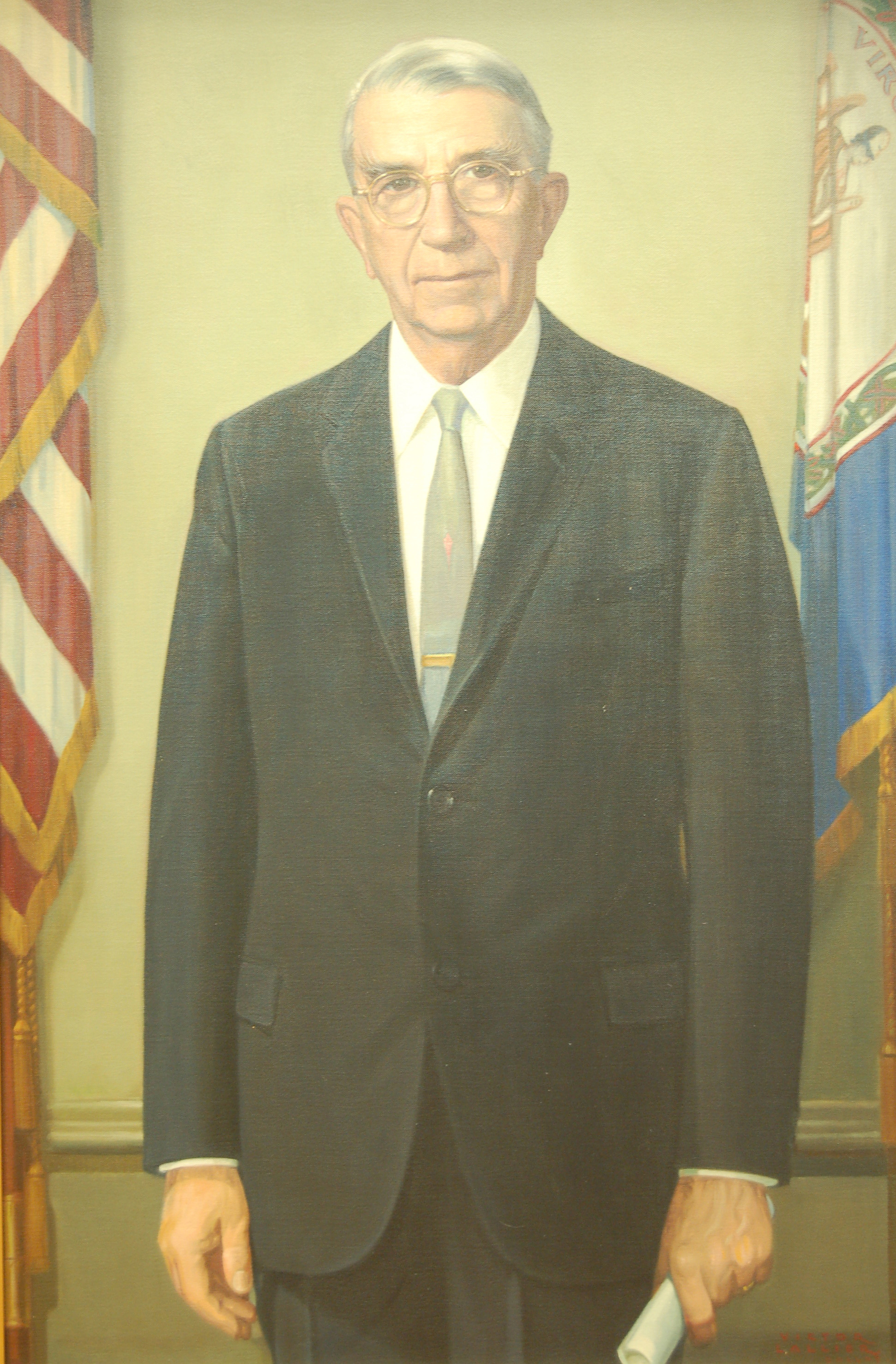
Saposs came under attack by the anti-union Democratic Representative Howard W. Smith (undated photo)

Later in 1935, Saposs joined the nascent National Labor Relations Board (NLRB). He quickly built a staff and began collecting information on the role labor unions played in interstate commerce and the social and economic impacts unions had. The research conducted under Saposs' leadership proved critical to winning over the Supreme Court of the United States, which held in National Labor Relations Board v. Jones & Laughlin Steel Corporation, 301 U.S. 1 (1938) that the National Labor Relations Act (NLRA) was constitutional. However, Saposs' tenure at the NLRB proved short. Although it had once supported the NLRA, the American Federation of Labor (AFL; which supported craft unionism) became convinced that the Board and its staff (including Saposs) were more supportive of the industrial unionism of its competitor, the Congress of Industrial Organizations. The AFL allied with anti-union Democratic Representative Howard W. Smith to attack the National Labor Relations Board. Saposs was a leader among anti-communist leftists. He had even been surreptitiously assessed by members of the Communist Party USA for membership, and rejected as a prospect. He had also tried to expose those individuals at the Board who he felt were communists. But Smith and others attacked Saposs as a communist, and the United States Congress defunded his division and his job on October 11, 1940.

=== Other federal positions ===
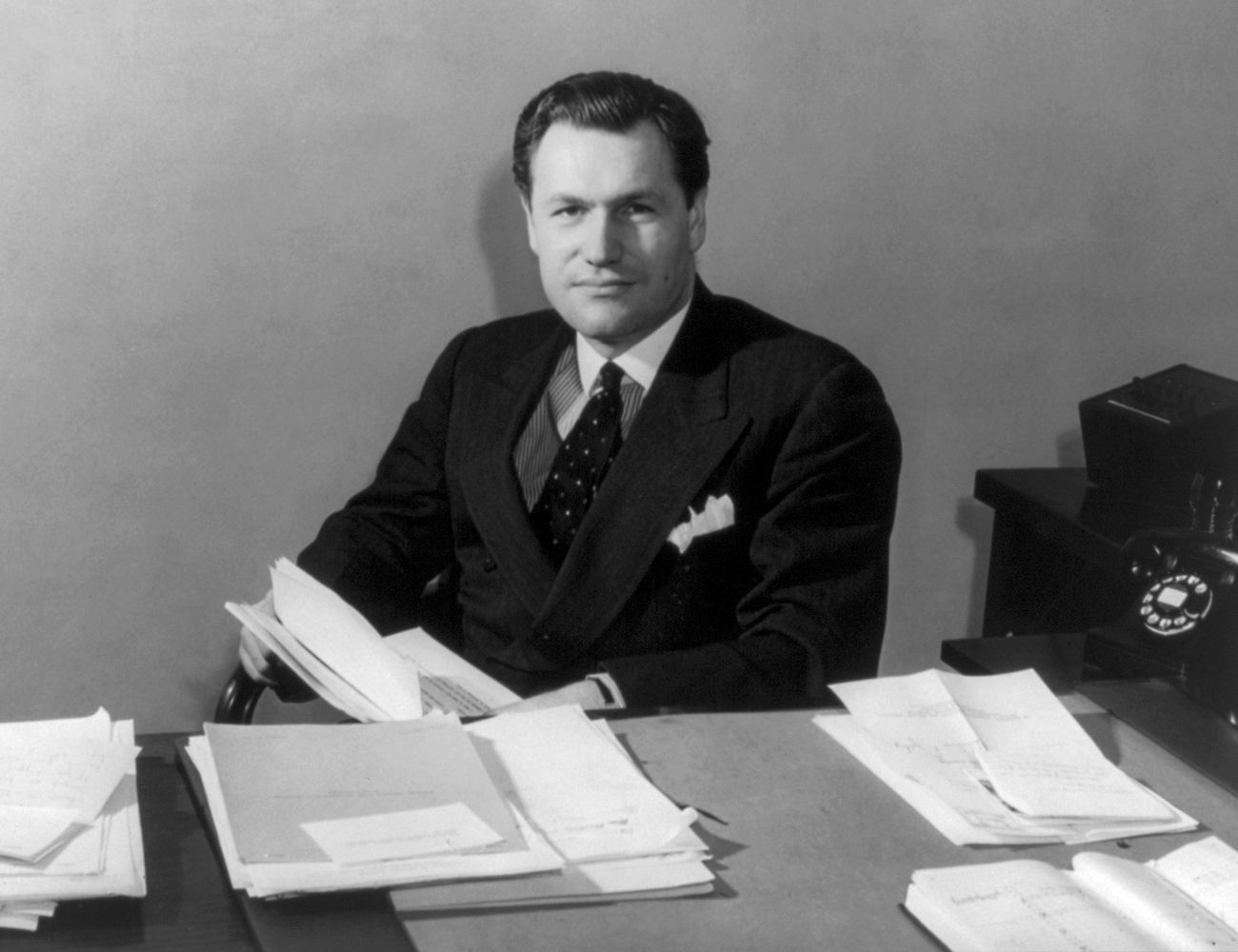
Saposs worked under Nelson Rockefeller (here, 1940)

Later in 1940, Republican Nelson Rockefeller hired Saposs as a consultant on labor issues to him for the Office of the Coordinator of Inter-American Affairs in the White House through 1942.

In 1945, Saposs became Chief of the Reports and Statistics Office in the Manpower Division of the Office of Military Government, United States, in post-World War II Germany. He left that position after a year to become Special Assistant to the Commissioner of Labor Statistics in the United States Department of Labor. In 1936, he became Special Assistant to the Commission of Labor Statistics at USDOL. In 1948, he became Special Advisor to the European Labor Division of the United States Economic Cooperation Administration. In 1952, he returned to Labor Statistics and retired from federal government service in 1954.

=== Academia again ===
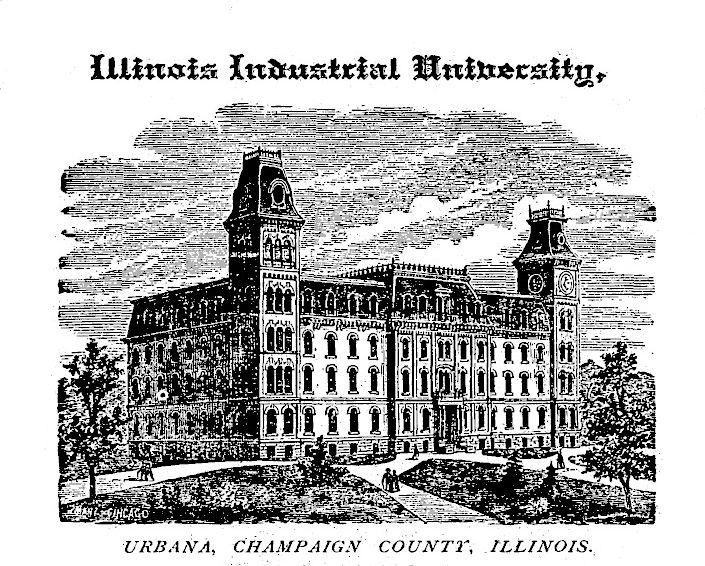
Saposs taught at the Institute of Labor and Industrial Relations (now UIUC Institute of Labor and Industrial Relations) at the University of Illinois at Urbana–Champaign (here, original University Hall)

In 1954, Saposs became a senior research associate at the Littauer Center for Public Administration at Harvard University through 1956. In 1955, he served the United States Department of State as lecturer on American and foreign labor issues at the Foreign Service Institute through 1963. In 1957, he was a visiting professor for a year at the Institute of Labor and Industrial Relations at the University of Illinois at Urbana–Champaign. In 1959, he was appointed Professor of American and International Labor in the School of International Service at American University in Washington, DC, and retired from there in 1965. While at American, he served as a lecturer on international labor at the Defense Intelligence School of the United States Department of Defense (1961–1964) and a senior specialist at the East–West Center of the University of Hawaii (1962–1964).

== Personal life and death ==
On July 3, 1917, Saposs married Bertha Tigay, a social worker; they had two daughters.

David Joseph Saposs died age 82 on November 13, 1968, at his home in Washington, D.C., from a stroke. His wife and two daughters survived him.

== Legacy ==
The University of Wisconsin's archive assesses Saposs as follows:

Although Saposs was a militant liberal and an early critic of Communist intervention in the American labor union movement, the House Committee on Un-American Affairs accused him of being a red, and he was forced to resign from the NLRB. His work on the Board was an integral part of the New Deal's efforts to better the status of the American worker.

== University of Wisconsin Badger gallery ==
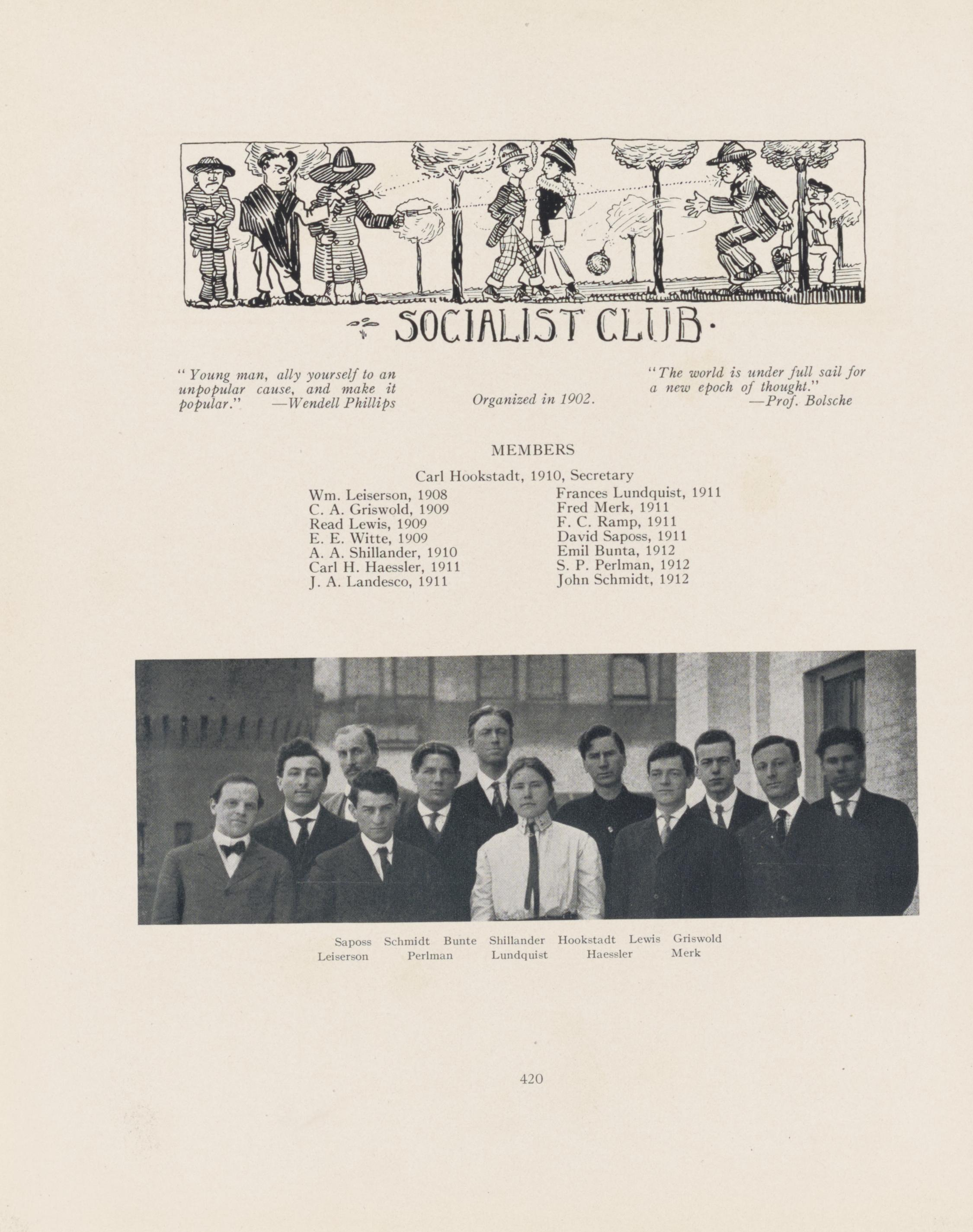
Socialist Club, 1910

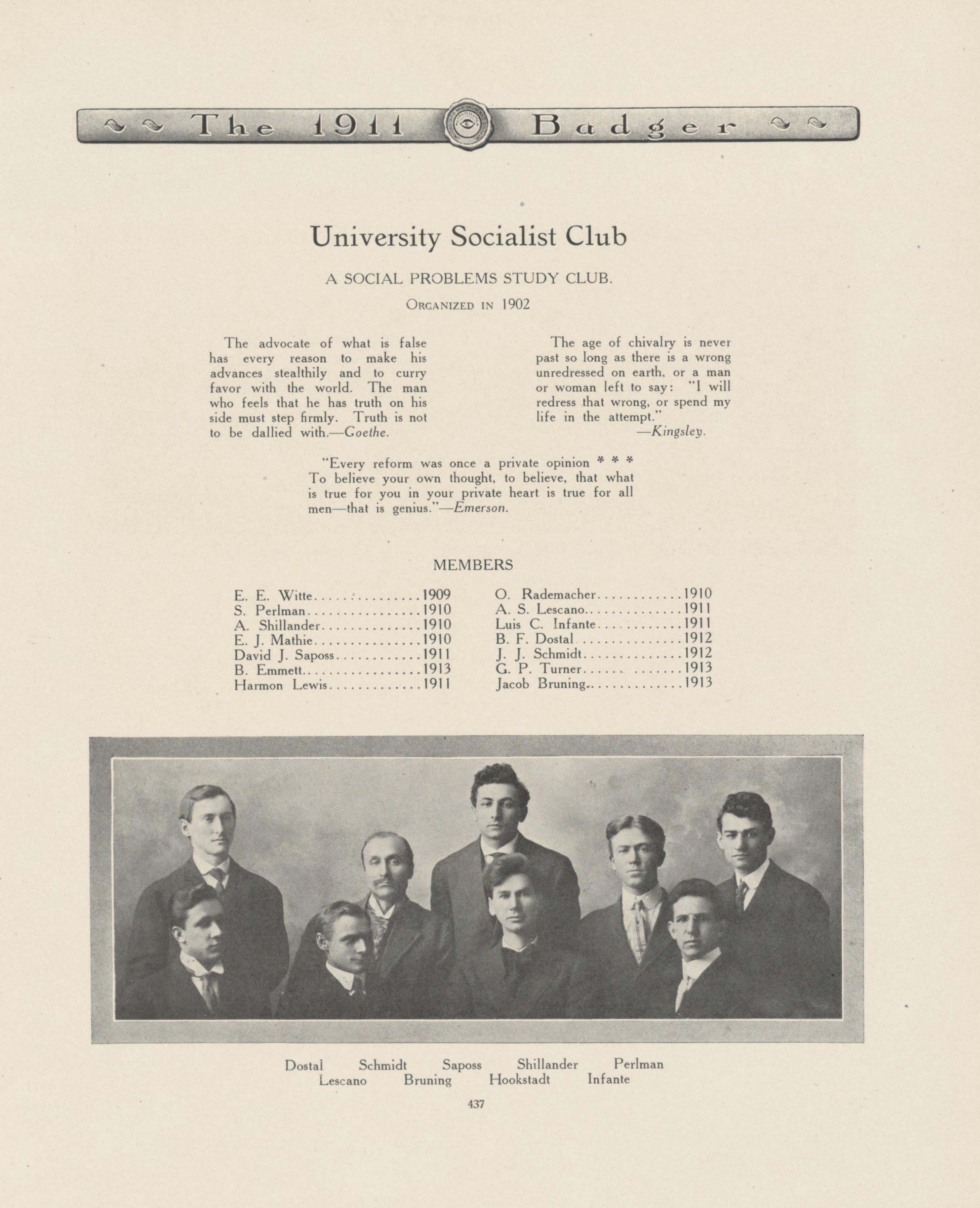
Socialist Club, 1911

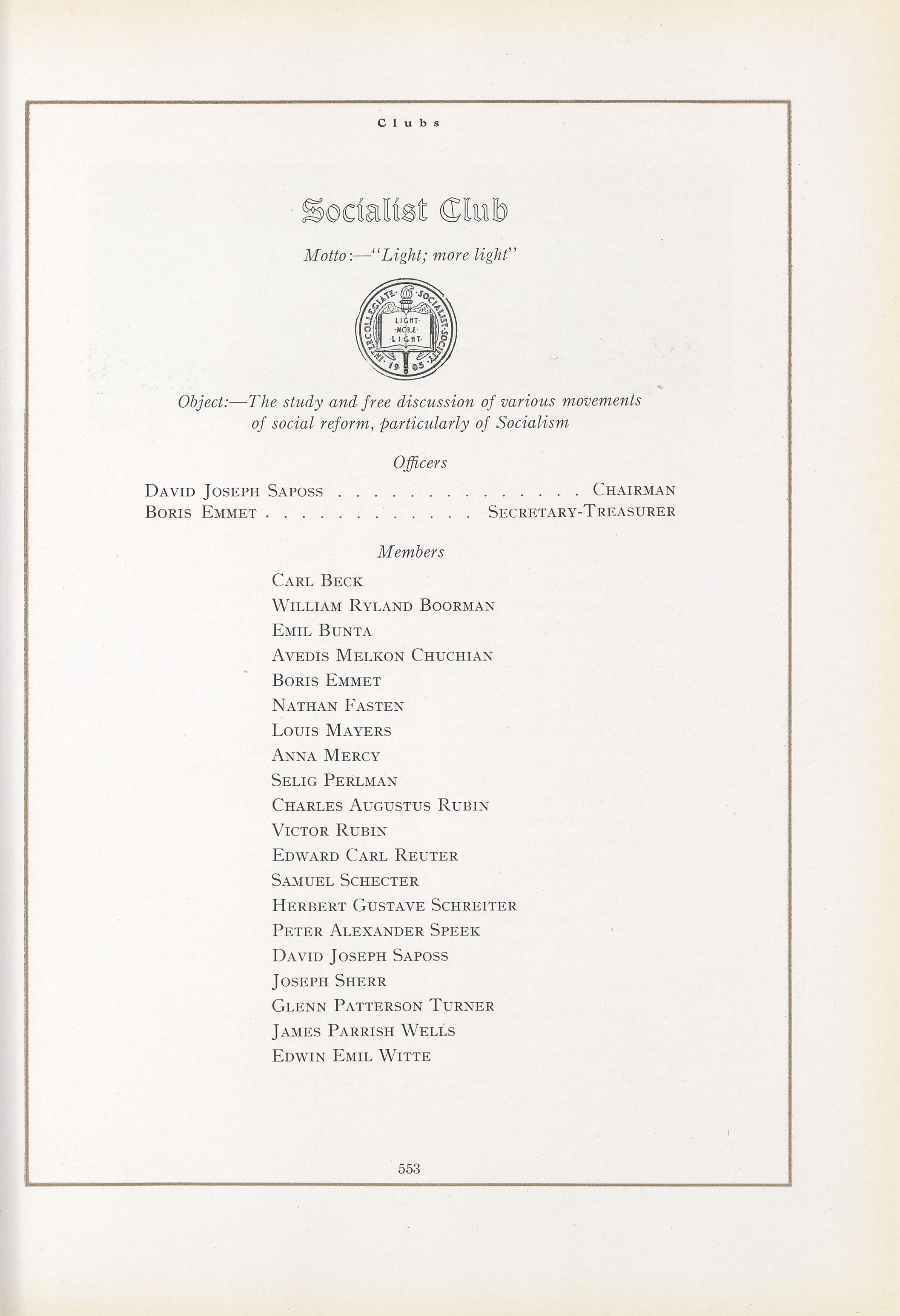
Socialist Club, 1913

== Works ==
Between 1913 and 1968, Saposs published more than a dozen books and many more articles.

Books

- History of Labour in the United States (1918)
- History of Labour in the United States (1921)
- Left Wing Unionism (1926)
- Readings in Trade Unionism with Bertha Tigay Saposs (1926)
- Union Responsibility and Incorporation of Labor Unions (1938)
- Effective Collective Bargaining with Lyle Winston Cooper (1938)
- Current Anti-labor Activities (1938)
- Effective Collective Bargaining (1940)
- Labor Racketeering: Evolution and Solutions (1958)
- Communism in American Union (1959)
- Communism in American Politics (1960)
- Case Studies in Labor Ideology: Denmark, Finland, Iceland, Norway, and Sweden (1964)
- Case Studies in Labor Ideology: Central European countries: Austria and Western Germany (1965)
- Case Studies in Labor Ideology (1971)

Articles

- "The Packers Break the Peace," Labor Age (1922)
- "The Line-up at Cincinnati," Labor Age (1922)
- "Unionizing the 'Brain Worker'," Labor Age (1922)
- "In the Wake of the Big Strike," Labor Age (1923)
- "The Need for a Labor Culture," Labor Age (1923)
- "Cut the Racket," Labor Age (1930)
- "The Rise and Decline of the A.F. of L." in Labor Age (1930)
- "Opposition in Socialist International," Labor Age (1931)

== Sources ==
- Betz, Paul R. and Carnes, Mark C. American National Biography. New York: Oxford University Press, 2005.
- Champlin, Dell P. and Knoedler, Janet T. The Institutionalist Tradition in Labor Economics. Armonk, N.Y.: M.E. Sharpe, 2004.
- "David Saposs, 82, Labor Economist." New York Times. November 16, 1968.
- Foner, Philip S. History of the Labor Movement in the United States. Vol. 1: From Colonial Times to the Founding of the American Federation of Labor. New York: International Publishers, 1947.
- Fraser, Steve and Gerstle, Gary. The Rise and Fall of the New Deal Order, 1930–1980. Princeton, N.J.: Princeton University Press, 1989.
- Gross, James A. The Making of the National Labor Relations Board: A Study in Economics, Politics, and the Law, 1933–1937. Albany, N.Y.: State University of New York Press, 1974.
- Gross, James A. The Reshaping of the National Labor Relations Board: National Labor Policy in Transition, 1937–1947. Albany, N.Y.: State University of New York Press, 1981.
- Investigation of Un-American Propaganda Activities in the United States. United States House of Representatives. Special Committee on Un-American Activities. 76th Congress, 3d sess. Washington, D.C.: U.S. Government Printing Office, 1940.
- Jacobs, Meg. Pocketbook Politics: Economic Citizenship in Twentieth-Century America. Princeton, N.J.: Princeton University Press, 2004.
- Papadimitriou, Dimitri B. "Minsky on Himself." In Financial Conditions and Macroeconomic Performance: Essays in Honor of Hyman P. Minsky. Steven M. Fazzari and Dimitri B. Papadimitriou, eds. Armonk, N.Y.: M.E. Sharpe, 1992.
- Tvede, Lars. Business Cycles: From John Law to the Internet Crash. 2d ed. Florence, Ky.: Psychology Press, 2001.
- Weir, Robert E. Class in America: An Encyclopedia. Westport, Conn.: Greenwood Press, 2007.
- Who Was Who in America, With World Notables. Chicago, Ill.: Marguis Who's Who, 1981.
- Zamora, Emilio. Claiming Rights and Righting Wrongs in Texas: Mexican Workers and Job Politics During World War II. College Station, Tex.: Texas A&M University Press, 2009.
