= League for Independent Political Action =

Defunct American progressive political organization

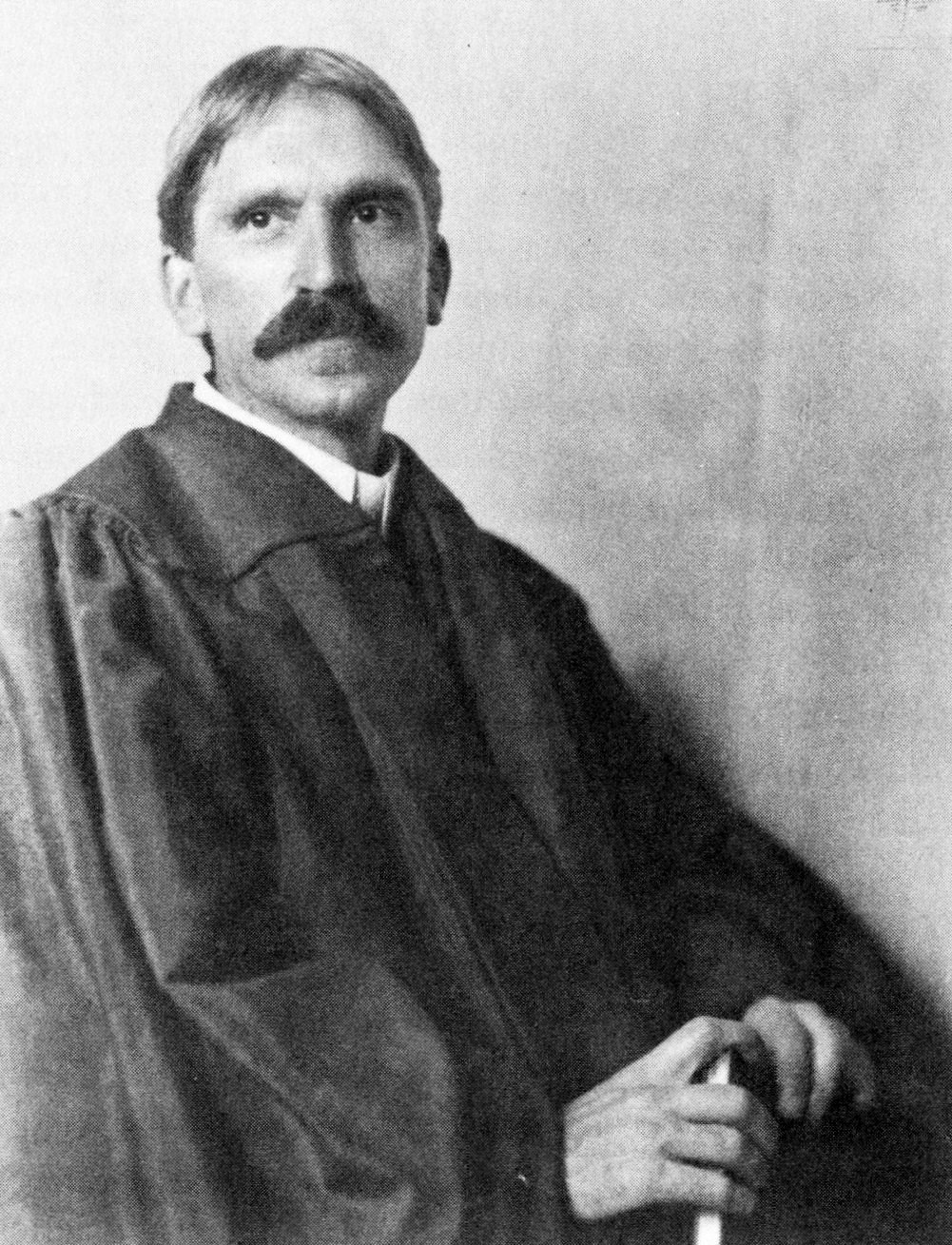
John Dewey, seen in this 1902 photograph as a young man, was chairman of the League for Independent Political Action.

The League for Independent Political Action (LIPA) was an American political organization established in late November or early December 1928 in New York City. The organization, which brought together liberals and socialists, was seen as a coordinating agency for a new political party in the United States. No such party was forthcoming, however, and the group remained in existence as a small membership organization into the middle years of the 1930s, when it was gradually rendered obsolete by the move to the New Deal by Franklin D. Roosevelt and the Democratic Party. The organization was terminated in 1936.

== Organizational history ==
=== Establishment ===
Within a month after the 1928 Presidential election which saw the election of Herbert Hoover as President of the United States, a number of prominent liberals and socialists gathered in New York City to assess the American political situation. Those gathered agreed on the need for a new political party in America bringing together progressives around a common program. Additional meetings were subsequently held at which a platform was written and a name given to the new organization — the League for Independent Political Action (LIPA). This name appears to have been borrowed wholesale from the official organization back of the 1924 independent Presidential campaign of Wisconsin progressive Senator Robert M. La Follette, Sr., the "Conference for Progressive Political Action."

The group soon published an initial leaflet entitled Wanted: A New Political Alignment which elucidated the principles of the new organization. This document proclaimed that "a political awakening is coming" which would cast aside the "Republican-Democratic alliance." The 1928 election had "revealed the fact" the Democratic Party had "not one fundamental economic issue to distinguish them from Republicans," according to this LIPA founding document.

The LIPA founding declaration announced the need for a new "political realignment" to correspond with the "general and far reaching industrial transformation" which the United States had experienced. It further called upon "forward-looking people in existing political parties and independent of existing parties" to join together in a "new party based on the principle of increasing social control" over industrial production and product distribution.

=== Program ===
General principles which the group espoused included government takeover of "strategic industries which are now being grossly mismanaged by private interests," including public utilities, coal mines, and the transportation system. LIPA was critical of the unequal distribution of wealth in the United States, declaring that the present system allowed "some to have so much more than they need and often without working for it" and declared the intention "to skim off through progressive taxes on unearned incomes, inheritance, and the increase in land values those surplus gains which are not necessary to induce effective service" or which were the byproduct of monopoly.

The LIPA also declared itself in favor of "social insurance from the hazards of accident, ill health, unemployment, and old age." A new party was necessary for the achievement of these ends, the organization declared:

"The employers are not going to protect against these evils in any adequate way. They must help pay the cost and will never do it, speaking generally, until forced to do so by legislation. The leaders of the old parties will not work for the enactment of these laws because the Republican and Democratic parties are merely the political expressions of the great business organizations.... If we want social insurance, we must help to build up a new party."

The organization also opined in favor of low tariffs, emphasizing that the Democratic Party had abandoned this historic principle and that farmers and consumers would see their tax burden reduced as the country steadily moved toward "the eventual goal of free trade, as an aid to the soundest prosperity and international good-will, and for the purpose of reducing special privilege, political corruption, and exploitation by favored interests."

Despite its repeated insistence that a new party would be necessary for the achievement of these ends, the LIPA officially declared that it "does not intend itself to become the new party but rather to act as a coordinating agency bringing together all those groups which ought to unite in the formation of such a party." Included in its sites were the Farmer-Labor Party of Minnesota, the Socialist Party of America, so-called "progressive elements now working in the old parties," trade unionists, progressive farmers, professionals, liberal journalists, and religious activists.

The executive committee of the organization subsequently adopted a rule prohibiting the endorsement of candidates of either the Republican or Democratic Parties whenever third party candidates representing the general principles of the League shared the ballot with them. Although this prohibition was binding upon all officers and members of the governing national and executive committees of the league, local branches and their officers were merely "requested to conform to the same rules," while individual members were "free to follow their own judgment" on such matters.

=== Development ===
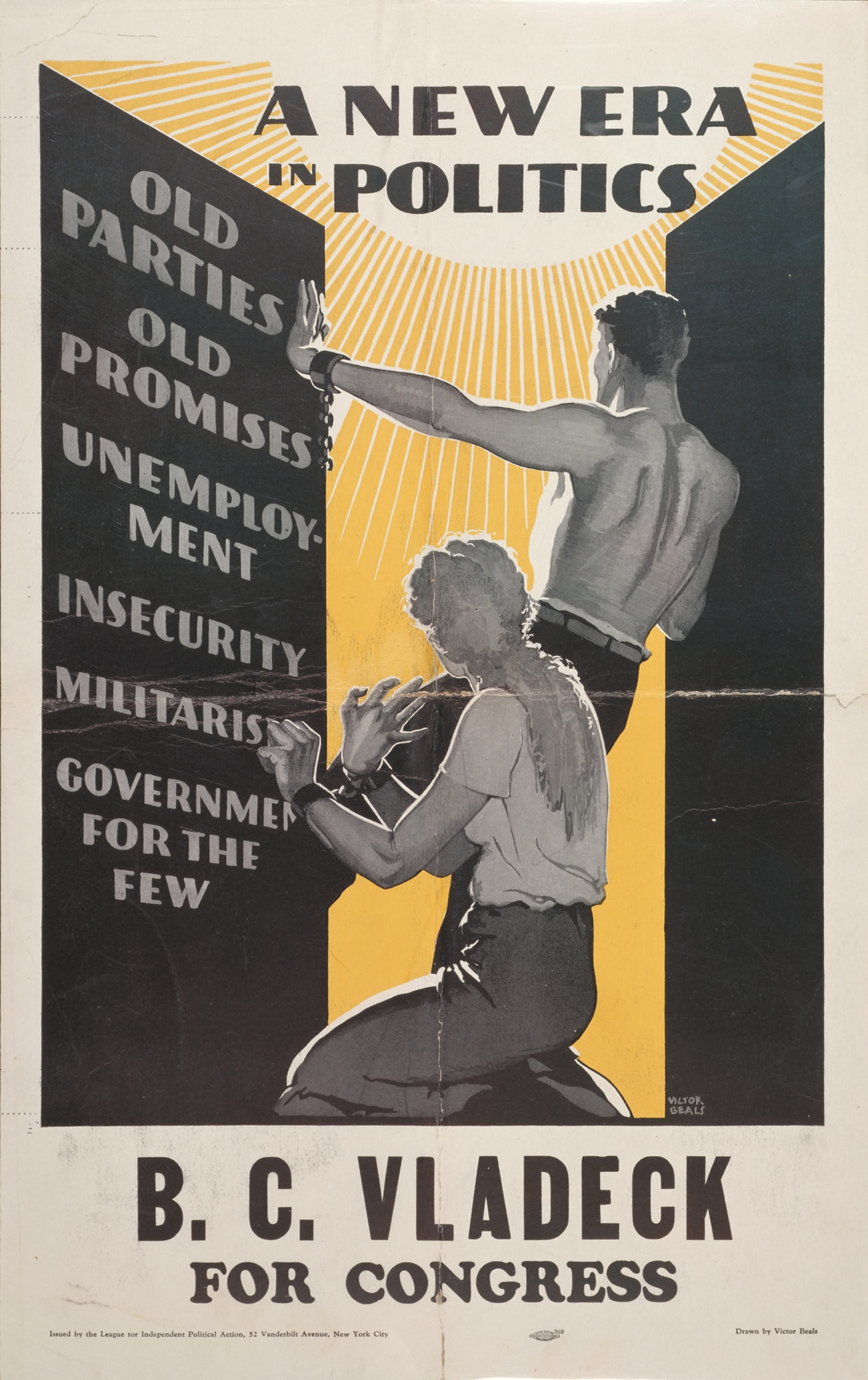
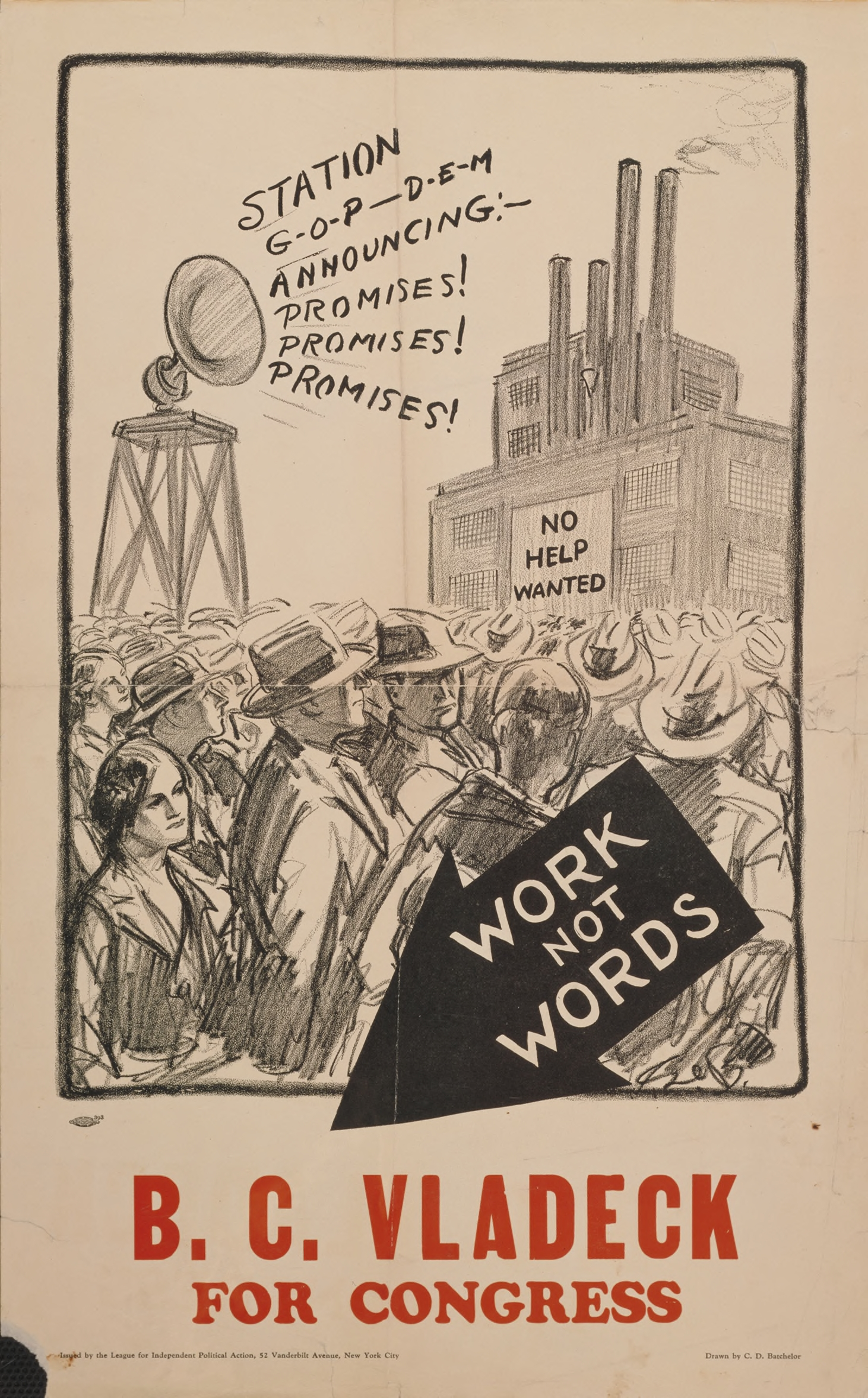
Socialist Party campaign posters, issued by the LIPA, featuring Baruch Charney Vladeck as a candidate for Congress, 1930

The LIPA made its first political endorsements in the election of 1930, recommending the entire ticket of the Farmer-Labor Party of Minnesota, Socialist candidates in New York state (including Heywood Broun, Frank Crosswaith, Samuel Orr, Jacob Panken, Norman Thomas, and Baruch Charney Vladeck), a pair of Socialist candidates for Congress from Wisconsin, and a pair of candidates from the Niagara Falls Labor Party and New Bedford, Massachusetts Labor Party, respectively.

Following the 1930 election, the League attempted to organize its supporters into functioning branches, with a goal of holding state conferences of progressive farmers, trade unionists, and political activists. In states with no functioning third parties already in the field, these state conferences were envisioned as the catalyst for the formation of new state political parties.

The Chairman of the LIPA from its earliest days was philosopher John Dewey. Dewey attempted to jumpstart the political power of the organization by bringing in sitting U.S. Senator George W. Norris of Nebraska, writing the progressive Midwesterner on December 23, 1930 and asking him to renounce both of the "old parties" and helping to give birth to a new political party based upon the principles of planning and control. This new organization would be instrumental "for the purpose of building happier lives, a more just society, and that peaceful world which was the dream of Him whose birthday we celebrate this Christmas Day," Dewey wrote.

Senator Norris was not inclined to go to this political extreme, however, writing Dewey back that "the people will not respond to a demand for a new party except in case of a great emergency, when there is practically a political revolution." This exchange between the scholar and the Senator received wide coverage in the popular press.

The appeal by Dewey to Norris had the additional effect of alienating A.J. Muste, head of Brookwood Labor College, who resigned his position on the LIPA executive committee, declaring his belief that "we must build our political machinery for a genuine labor party down on the ground first" by energizing masses of workers rather than by "inviting such figures practically to form a new party. In resigning, Muste stated that "for the present it is of the utmost importance to avoid every appearance of seeking messiahs who are to bring down a third party out of the political heavens."

Despite Dewey's widely publicized failure, the LIPA still managed modest organizational growth, ending 1930 with approximately 4,500 dues-paying members and local branches in about 20 states. Average paid membership for the entire year was 3,756 for all of 1930, which grew to 6,062 in 1931, according to a report by the Executive Secretary of LIPA, Howard Y. Williams.

Executive Secretary Howard Y. Williams addresses the 3rd Convention of the LIPA in Cleveland, Ohio, July 1932.

By the beginning of 1932, there were a total of 11 state committees, 51 local branches, and 43 local representatives intent upon organizing additional branches of LIPA. The League made use of dinners and banquets to promote the organization, while Executive Secretary Williams delivered dozens of addresses to trade unions, women's groups, farm organizations, community forums, and other organizations.

The LIPA was formally governed by annual conferences of its members. The May 1931 gathering determined to hold a joint conference of third party groups in an effort to wield unified action in the 1932 election campaign.

Late in 1931, with the Great Depression sweeping America and the ranks of the unemployed swelling with no end in sight, the LIPA invited a number of economists and progressive political activists to assist in formulating a platform for the group for the 1932 campaign. In January 1932 those participating gathered to draft a formal document called "A Four Year Presidential Plan, 1932-1936," which the League executive committee finalized and released to the press. This document again asserted the necessity for an independent political party to solve the nations ills, declaring:

"We are in the midst of a tragic breakdown of industry, employment, and finance, with all the attendant human suffering. The Republican and Democratic parties cannot meet the emergency for they are the tools and servants of the forces and the men who have promoted the very policies which have in large measure brought about the crisis. Only a new party can restore the agencies of government to the service of the people.... This party will restore reality to democracy by attacking the concentration of wealth in the hands of the few and by preventing the insecurity, disproportionate risk, fear, and loss of vital civil liberties which are the lot of many."

The 1932 platform advocated higher progressive income taxes and inheritance taxes, lower tariffs continuing the process towards eventual free trade, public ownership of utilities, coal, oil, and railroads, and reform of the banking industry to eliminate "extra-banking activities" as well as "investment trusts" and "trading activities." Provisions were included for the restoration of civil rights through the abolition of syndicalism laws, the Espionage Act, and the use of unlawful searches and so-called "Third Degree" tactics by the police. Equal economic, political, and legal rights were demanded for black Americans as well as an end to legal laxity towards lynching. "Drastic cuts, approximating 50 percent" were demanded for military expenditures on the army, navy, and air force while the abolition of military conscription through a constitutional amendment was insisted upon.

=== Dissolution and legacy ===
The election of Franklin D. Roosevelt and the inauguration of the liberal social policies of the New Deal undermined the political impetus driving the League for Independent Political Action. Early in 1933, the group's official Monthly Bulletin was merged into the Common Sense magazine. It was formally terminated in October of that year.

With its members engaged in other political activities during the kinetic years of the middle-1930s, the League for Independent Political Action rapidly lost members. It continued to limp along as a shell of its former self until it was formally terminated in 1936.

A partial run of the monthly organ of LIPA, the News Bulletin, is available on microfilm with the master negative held by the Cleveland Public Library.

== Conventions ==
Convention	Location	Date	Notes
1st National Conference	Washington, DC	May 17–18, 1930	Attended by 200 delegates from 12 states.
2nd National Conference	New York City	May 22–23, 1931	Attended by about 500 delegates.
3rd National Conference	Cleveland, Ohio	July 9-10, 1932	Attended by delegates from 153 cities.

== Prominent members ==
- Devere Allen
- Harry Elmer Barnes
- Paul Brissenden
- Jane P. Clark
- John Dewey
- Paul H. Douglas
- W. E. B. Du Bois
- Sherwood Eddy
- Helen Hamlin Fincke
- Nathan Fine
- Sidney Hillman
- Hannah Clothier Hull
- Harry W. Laidler
- Corliss Lamont
- John A. Lapp
- Robert Morss Lovett
- Archibald MacLeish
- William Mahoney
- James H. Maurer
- Lewis Mumford
- A. J. Muste
- Reinhold Niebuhr
- Joseph Schlossberg
- Oswald Garrison Villard
- Charney Vladeck
- Howard Y. Williams

== Publications ==
The official organ of the League for Independent Political Action was the News Bulletin of the League for Independent Political Action. This was established in June 1930 and merged into the magazine Common Sense in April 1933 and terminated in October of that same year. (Common Sense continued publication through 1943.)

The organization also published a number of political pamphlets, including:

- Wanted: A New Political Alignment. New York: League for Independent Political Action, 1929.
- Paul H. Douglas, Why a Political Realignment. New York: League for Independent Political Action, 1930.
- Henry Raymond Mussey, Unemployment: A Practical Program. New York: League for Independent Political Action, 1930.
- Oswald Garrison Villard, The Tariff Scandal. New York: League for Independent Political Action, 1930.
- John Dewey, Democracy Joins the Unemployed: Address. New York: League for Independent Political Action, 1932.
- Audacity! More Audacity! Always Audacity! New York: United Action Campaign Committee of the League for Independent Political Action, n.d. [1933].
- Why the League for Independent Political Action. New York: League for Independent Political Action, n.d. [c. 1934].
- Fascism. St. Paul, MN: League for Independent Political Action and the Farmer Labor Political Federation, n.d. [c. 1934].

== See also ==
- Progressivism in the United States
- Social democracy
