= Frederick L. Schuman =

American historian

Frederick Lewis Schuman (born Schumann; 22 February 1904 – 18 May 1981) was an American professor of history, political science and international relations at Williams College, Massachusetts.

== Biography ==
Schuman was born in Chicago, Illinois. After attending Lake View High School, he attended the University of Chicago for his undergraduate degree, followed by Columbia University for his Ph. B., before returning to the University of Chicago, where he earned a Ph. D. in political science in 1927, and then took a teaching position. He remained at the University of Chicago until moving to Williams College in 1936, where he would teach for 32 years and was ultimately named the Woodrow Wilson Professor of Government. He specialized on international relations and social science, focusing on the period between World War I and World War II.

In 1932, amid the Great Depression and widespread disillusionment about capitalism's prospects, Schuman had signed an open letter supporting the League of Professional Groups for William Z. Foster and James W. Ford, candidates of the Communist Party of the United States (CPUSA), in that year's presidential election. In his 1936 book The Nazi Dictatorship, Schuman criticized the Nazi Party in Germany, which he described as

the tool of the established ruling classes against their enemies.... This inner contradiction of a 'socialistic' mass party serving the interests of Property and Profits is the secret of the economic and social progress of the Third Reich […]. Hitler and his aides were compelled to talk 'socialism' and to glorify small business men, peasants, and wage-earners as a means of retaining their mass following. They were also compelled to appease aristocrats and industrialists or face destruction. This apparently impossible task was simplified by the neurotic and irrational character of mass expectations. Political sadism, the persecution of scapegoats, the glorification of war, the encouragement of racial megalomania, and the systematic inculcation of the new faith have afforded substantial psychic satisfactions to a populace whose sickness of the soul has progressed so far that it makes a virtue of poverty and abnegation, idealizes armed conflict and death, (and) prefers mythology to nutrition.... Circuses have in part taken the place of bread.

In a 1936 article titled "Liberalism and Communism Reconsidered" he sought to reconcile liberal and Marxist viewpoints, arguing both had common interests against fascism. Despite such activity, however, Schuman later wrote that "the major premises of Marxism, viewed in retrospect, are demonstrably false […] No civilized society has ever been, or can ever be, 'classless' or 'stateless.' Total socialism, where achieved, thus far resembles Aldous Huxley's Brave New World or George Orwell's 1984 far more than Plato's perfect polity or Sir Thomas More's Utopia."

On the night of December 7, 1941, Schuman told an audience at the Ford Hall Forum, "The Nazis, Fascists, and Japanese have made one tragic blunder. They allowed themselves to believe that the work of disintegration in America had gone far enough for them to strike. They're wrong." He also said that the United States should lead "a new world order and world unity." He urged recognition of the Free French and aid to governments-in-exile in overthrowing quisling regimes, leading toward the overthrow of Hitler. He predicted that Japan could fight for only three or four months.

During World War II, Schuman was on leave from Williams to act as an analyst for the Foreign Broadcast Information Service (FBIS) of the Federal Communications Commission (FCC). He came under attack by the House Un-American Activities Committee in 1943 as having a record of "Communist affiliations." Schuman denied the accusations and successfully withstood efforts by the committee to have him removed from his position as an FBIS analyst. Many vocal critics, including several Williams alumni, objected to the professor's outspoken liberalism, suspected communism, and continued to call for Schuman's dismissal throughout the rest of his career at the college.

In a 1945 American Political Science Review article, Schuman criticized notions that a new collective security organization could contribute to world peace. Schuman pointed to examples from history of collective security organizations that failed to facilitate world peace. He argued that the organization that would become the United Nations could only facilitate world peace if the United States, the Soviet Union, and the United Kingdom worked in unison, but that the organization would fail if there were divisions between the three powers.

Schuman again came under attack as a communist sympathizer by Senator Joseph R. McCarthy in 1950 and 1953.

In his 1953 book Techniques of Communism, ex-communist and paid FBI informant Louis Budenz wrote a subsection on Schuman in a chapter on "Affecting Public Opinion." Budenz asserted that Schuman was a CPUSA member in the 1930s and 1940s. Citing Eugene Lyons' 1941 book The Red Decade, Budenz asserted that Schuman had supported CPUSA head William Z. Foster's bid for the US presidency (1932), traveled to and lectured in the USSR (1933–4), extolled US-USSR friendship at a Carnegie Hall gala (1936), called for closer Soviet ties in an open letter in the Daily Worker (1939), and supported alleged Soviet spy Gerhart Eisler (1946). He cites several books by Schuman as being subversive: American Policy Toward Russia Since 1917, American Politics at Home and Abroad (error for Soviet Politics at Home and Abroad?), and The Commonwealth of Man. He also listed "Communist fronts" to which Schuman belonged. In sum, Budenz claimed, Schuman had "done tremendous damage" to the US. (Budenz also notes that Schuman had attacked ex-communists who had testified for the US government, "particularly Whittaker Chambers, Louis Budenz, and Elizabeth Bentley.")

In the 1960s, Schuman undertook several, very public political and social battles at Williams, including his much-publicized refusal to attend ceremonies during a visit from Lady Bird Johnson, which he considered to be the college's tacit indication of support for the Johnson Administration's involvement in the Vietnam War.

== Legacy ==
The term "geo-strategy" was first used by Schuman in his 1942 article "Let Us Learn Our Geopolitics". It was a translation of the German term Wehrgeopolitik, as used by the German geostrategist Karl Haushofer. Previous translations had been attempted, such as "defense-geopolitics." Robert Strausz-Hupé had coined and popularized "war geopolitics" as another alternate translation.

== Works ==
Schuman's 1946 book Soviet Politics At Home and Abroad was criticised by Dwight Macdonald as "a neo-Stalinist survey, that is, its author admits practically everything and justifies it in turgid surges of clotted prose as necessary and even praise-worthy". A more positive review stated, "To those who do not share the outlook of a particular author, his convictions are apt to appear biased or prejudiced, and Professor Schuman is not likely to escape criticisms on that score. None the less, he has made an earnest attempt at a balanced and temperate account of Soviet development, and has achieved a very considerable measure of success." Marshall D. Shulman, the Columbia University professor who was the Carter Administration's leading expert on the Soviet Union, recalled using the book for a class he taught at City College of New York in the late 1940s.

Schuman's 1957 book Russia Since 1917 (which was in some ways an updated version of Soviet Politics At Home and Abroad) was described by Kirkus Reviews as "a compendium, elaborately researched and as fairminded as anyone could reasonably desire." The International Socialist Review accused the author of having "no understanding of Marxism" and of a "vilification of Trotsky and the Left Opposition," but considered certain other aspects of the book to be valuable and claimed Schuman's argument that "the double-crossing and chicanery of Allied diplomacy was due to the hope that the 'Fascist Triplice' would save 'civilization' from Bolshevism, is ironclad".

Books

- American Policy Toward Russia Since 1917: A Study of Diplomatic History, International Law and Public Opinion. New York: International Publishers. 1928. OCLC 254581962.
- The Baltic Soviet Republics (introduction). New York: National Council of American-Soviet Friendship. 1944.
- War and Diplomacy in the French Republic: An Inquiry into Political Motivations and the Control of Foreign Policy. New York: McGraw-Hill (Fertig Howard Inc. 1970 ). 1931. ISBN 0-86527-204-2.
- International Politics: An Introduction to the Western State System. New York: McGraw-Hill. 1933. OCLC 392648.
- Nazi Dictatorship: A Study in Social Pathology and the Politics of Fascism. Ams Pr Inc. 1936. ISBN 0-404-56403-8. OCLC 1743297.
- Germany Since 1918. New York: Henry Holt and Company. 1937. OCLC 547150.
- Europe on the Eve, the Crises of Diplomacy, 1933–1939. New York: Alfred A. Knopf (Greenwood Publishing Group 1971). 1939. ISBN 0-8371-5766-8. OCLC 3041919.
- Night over Europe; the Diplomacy of Nemesis, 1939–1940. New York: Alfred A. Knopf (Greenwood Publishing Group 1986). 1941. ISBN 0-8371-2641-X. OCLC 888733.
- International Politics: The Western State System in Transition. New York: McGraw-Hill. 1941. OCLC 3122442.
- Schuman, Frederick L.; Brodsky, George D. (1941). Design for Power: The Struggle for the World. New York: Alfred A. Knopf. OCLC 543587.
- Soviet Politics at Home and Abroad. New York: Alfred A. Knopf. 1946. OCLC 735395. (kirja-arvio)
- The Commonwealth of Man, An Inquiry into Power, Politics and World Government. New York (Westport CT): Alfred A. Knopf (Greenwood Press 1977). 1952. ISBN 0-8371-9372-9.
- International Politics: The Western State System in Mid-Century. New York: McGraw-Hill. 1953. OCLC 1035560.
- Russia since 1917; four decades of Soviet politics. New York: Alfred A. Knopf. 1957. OCLC 406862.
- Government in the Soviet Union. New York: Thomas Y. Crowell Comp. 1961. OCLC 6574402.
- Cold War: Retrospect and Prospect. Baton Rouge: Louisiana State University Press. 1963. ISBN 0-8071-0126-5.
- Why a department of peace?. Beverly Hills: Another Mother for Peace. 1969. OCLC 339785.
