= School of Labor and Employment Relations (University of Illinois Urbana-Champaign) =

Graduate college in Illinois, U.S.

Coordinates: 40.1057°N 88.2316°W

The School of Labor and Employment Relations (LER) is a graduate school at the University of Illinois Urbana-Champaign. Founded in 1946, the school is the second oldest labor and industrial relations school in the nation. Students at Illinois can earn a Master of Human Resources and Industrial Relations (terminal professional degree) or a PhD in Industrial Relations (which is typically accompanied by an M.S. degree during the process of earning the doctorate). The school focuses on the MHRIR program. Until August 2008, LER was known as the Institute of Labor and Industrial Relations. In spring, 2015, the master's program expanded to accommodate an online program targeted to working professionals.

== Facilities ==
The School of Labor and Employment Relations is located at 504 East Armory Avenue in Champaign. The facility hosts faculty offices, administrative offices, three classrooms, interview rooms and conference rooms. As much of the LER program has interdisciplinary ties with economics, law, psychology and business, some classes and faculty are affiliated with those program's facilities as well.

== Departments ==
Faculty are organized into the following areas:

- Human Resource Management and Organizational Behavior
- Industrial Relations and Labor Studies
- Labor Economics
- Labor Law, Public Policy and Ethics
- International, Comparative, and Cross-Cultural Studies

The School also is home to a statewide Labor Education Program to instruct over 2,000 union members each year. The program offers classes both on the Illinois campus and off campus about trade unions and the collective bargaining process.

== See also ==
- Labor and Employment Relations Association
