= A. J. Muste =

American clergyman and activist (1885–1967)

The Reverend A. J. Muste
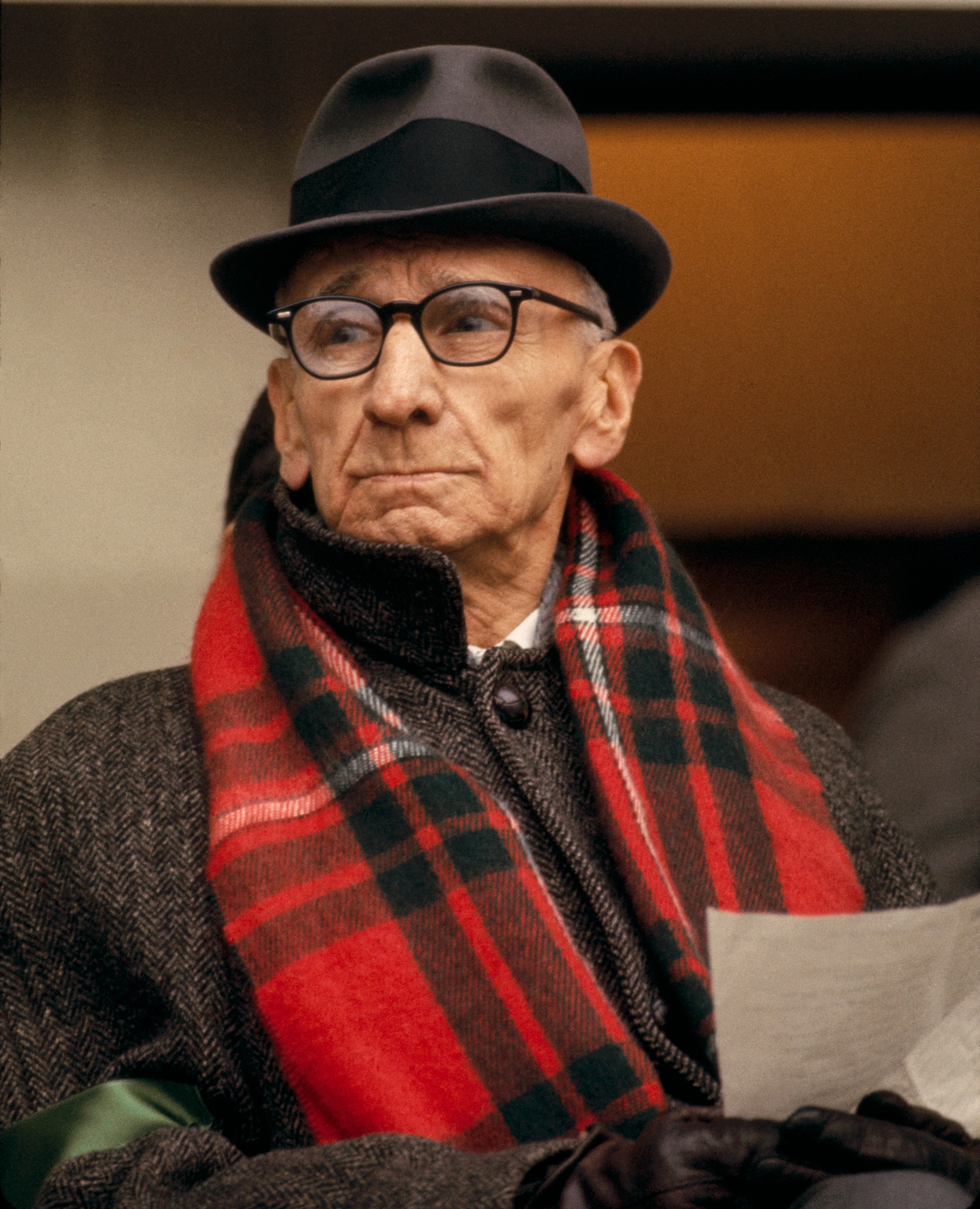
- Muste in Central Park, New York, late 1960s
- Born: Abraham Johannes Muste; January 8, 1885; Zierikzee, Netherlands
- Died: February 11, 1967 (aged 82); New York City, New York, U.S.
- Citizenship: American (naturalized)
- Education: Hope College (BA); New Brunswick Theological Seminary; Union Theological Seminary (BDiv)
- Spouse: Anna Huizenga
- Children: 3

Abraham Johannes Muste (/ˈmʌsti/ MUS-tee; January 8, 1885 – February 11, 1967) was a Dutch-born American clergyman and political activist. He is best remembered for his work in the labor movement, the pacifist movement, the anti-war movement, and the civil rights movement in the United States.

== Early life ==
Muste was born on January 8, 1885, in the small port city of Zierikzee, Zeeland, in the southwestern Netherlands. His father, Martin Muste, was a coachman who drove for a family that was part of Zeeland's hereditary nobility. With his economic prospects limited in the Netherlands, Martin decided to follow four brothers of his wife, Adriana, and emigrate to America. They made the trans-Atlantic trip as third-class passengers in January 1891.

Muste's mother became ill aboard ship and remained hospitalized for a month at Ellis Island after the family's arrival. Upon her recovery, the family headed west for Grand Rapids, Michigan, where Adriana's four brothers pursued a variety of small business ventures.

The family attended services at the Grand Rapids Dutch Reformed Church, a Calvinist congregation in which religious services were conducted in Dutch. Its very existence was testimony to the number of Dutch immigrants in the area. Dancing, the singing of secular music and the viewing of dramatic performances were prohibited by the church as sins.

Members of the denomination tended to be of the working class, like most other Dutch people in the area, who were regarded as a source of cheap labor in the years before World War I by the longer-established English-speaking population. Muste later recalled that his fellow Dutch Reformed Church members were "all Republicans and would no more have voted for a Democrat than turned horse thief."

Along with the rest of his family, he became naturalized as an American citizen in 1896. He was 11 years old at the time of his naturalization.

== Education and pastoral career ==
Muste attended Hope College in Holland, Michigan, just west of Grand Rapids, on the coast of Lake Michigan. He graduated in 1905 with a bachelor's degree at age 20. At Hope College, he was class valedictorian, captain of the school's basketball team, and played second base for the baseball squad.

After his graduation, Muste taught Latin and Greek for the 1905–06 academic year at Northwestern Classical Academy (now Northwestern College) in Orange City, Iowa.

In the fall of 1906, Muste went east to New Brunswick, New Jersey, to attend the Theological Seminary of the Reformed Church in America (now the New Brunswick Theological Seminary). While there, Muste took courses in philosophy at New York University and Columbia University, attended lectures by William James, and met John Dewey, who became a personal friend. While he remained in training to become a minister of the Reformed Church, Muste seems to have begun to question the church's fundamental principles at that time.

He graduated in June 1909 and married his sweetheart from his Hope College days, Anna Huizenga. Muste then was appointed pastor of the Fort Washington Collegiate Church in the Washington Heights neighborhood of Manhattan, New York City. In his spare time, he used his new parish's proximity to the theologically liberal Union Theological Seminary to take additional courses there. He ultimately received a Bachelor of Divinity from Union, graduating magna cum laude.

Muste was influenced by the prevalent theology of the social gospel and began reading the ideas of various radical thinkers of the day. He voted for Socialist candidate Eugene V. Debs for U.S. president in 1912. Muste would later state that he never again voted for a Republican or Democrat for a major national or state office.

Muste remained as pastor of the Fort Washington Collegiate Church on Washington Heights until 1914, when he became increasingly uncomfortable with the Reformed Church and left it.

Thereafter, he became an independent Congregationalist minister and accepted a pastorate at the Central Congregational Church of Newtonville, Massachusetts, in February 1915.

A committed pacifist, Muste joined the Fellowship of Reconciliation shortly after its foundation in 1916. He participated in a peace demonstration late in the summer of 1916, with US entry into the First World War looming and some parishioners withdrawing from his congregation. Pressure began to build further over Muste's pacifist views in April 1917, when the United States formally declared war on the German and Austro-Hungarian Empires. After taking two months of vacation leave in the summer of 1917, he decided that the time had come to leave. In December 1917, he formally resigned his pastorate position.

After his resignation, Muste did volunteer work for the Boston chapter of the new Civil Liberties Bureau, a legal-aid organization that defended both political and pacifist war resisters.

Later in 1918, he moved to Providence, Rhode Island, where he was enrolled as a Religious Society of Friends (Quaker) minister. He received the use of a home and money for expenses in exchange for pastoral services. An array of political publications was kept in a large room in the basement of the Providence Meeting House, and each Saturday, pacifists, radicals, and an eclectic mix of individuals gathered there to discuss issues of concern.

== 1919 Lawrence textile strike ==
Muste became involved in trade union activity in 1919, when he took an active part as a leader of a 16-week-long textile strike in Lawrence, Massachusetts. Workers in the mills worked an average of 54 hours a week, at an average rate of just over 20 cents per hour, and were threatened with a loss of income by an uncompensated cut of working hours. A demand grew among the millworkers for 54 hours of pay for the new working week of 48 hours.

However, as most workers were new immigrants who spoke English poorly or not at all, they were without effective leadership to express their demands. When dissident workers walked off the job in February 1919 only to be met by police truncheons on the picket line, Muste and two friends, also ministers, became involved. He spoke to assembled workers, assured them that he would lend whatever help he could in raising money for the relief of strikers and their families, and was soon invited to become executive secretary of the ad hoc strike committee that had been established by the still unorganized workers. He became the spokesman for some 30,000 striking workers from more than 20 countries. Himself pulled from the picket line as a strike leader, isolated, and clubbed by police, he was eventually deposited into a wagon and hauled to jail when he could no longer stand. After a week behind bars, the case against Muste for allegedly disturbing the peace was dismissed. More than 100 strikers were jailed but the strike continued.

While the police anticipated more violence and even placed machine guns at critical points along Lawrence's principal streets, Muste and the strike committee chose nonviolence. He advised the striking textile workers to "smile as we pass the machine guns and the police." Despite the efforts of agents provocateurs, the strike remained peaceful.

The strike was eventually settled after 16 weeks, after both sides neared exhaustion and became willing to compromise. The ultimate agreement called for a shortened working week, a 12% hike in hourly and piecework wages, and the recognition of shop grievance committees in all departments.

== Amalgamated Textile Workers of America ==
While the Lawrence textile strike was going on, Muste traveled to New York City to attend a convention of trade union activists in the textile industry. The gathering resulted in the formation of the Amalgamated Textile Workers of America (ATWU). Based upon his prominence as the head of the Lawrence textile strike and shutdown, he was elected secretary of the new union.

Muste would serve as head of the fledgling union for two years until he stepped down from his post in 1921.

== Brookwood and CPLA ==
Upon leaving the ATWU, Muste became the first chairman of the faculty at Brookwood Labor College in Katonah, New York, where he remained from 1921 to 1933. He cemented his reputation as a recognized leader of the American labor movement.

In 1929, Muste attempted to organize radical unionists opposed to the passive policies of American Federation of Labor President William Green under the banner of the new Conference for Progressive Labor Action (CPLA).

Muste also was a member of the League for Independent Political Action (LIPA), a group of liberals and socialists that was headed by philosopher John Dewey and sought the establishment of a new labor-based third party. He resigned his position on the LIPA Executive Committee in December 1930 in protest over Dewey's appeal to US Senator George W. Norris of Nebraska to quit the Republican Party to head the third-party movement. Muste declared that any such movement must start from the bottom up by the action of organized workers if it was to survive and that it was "of the utmost importance to avoid every appearance of seeking messiahs who are to bring down a third party out of the political heavens."

== Party politics ==
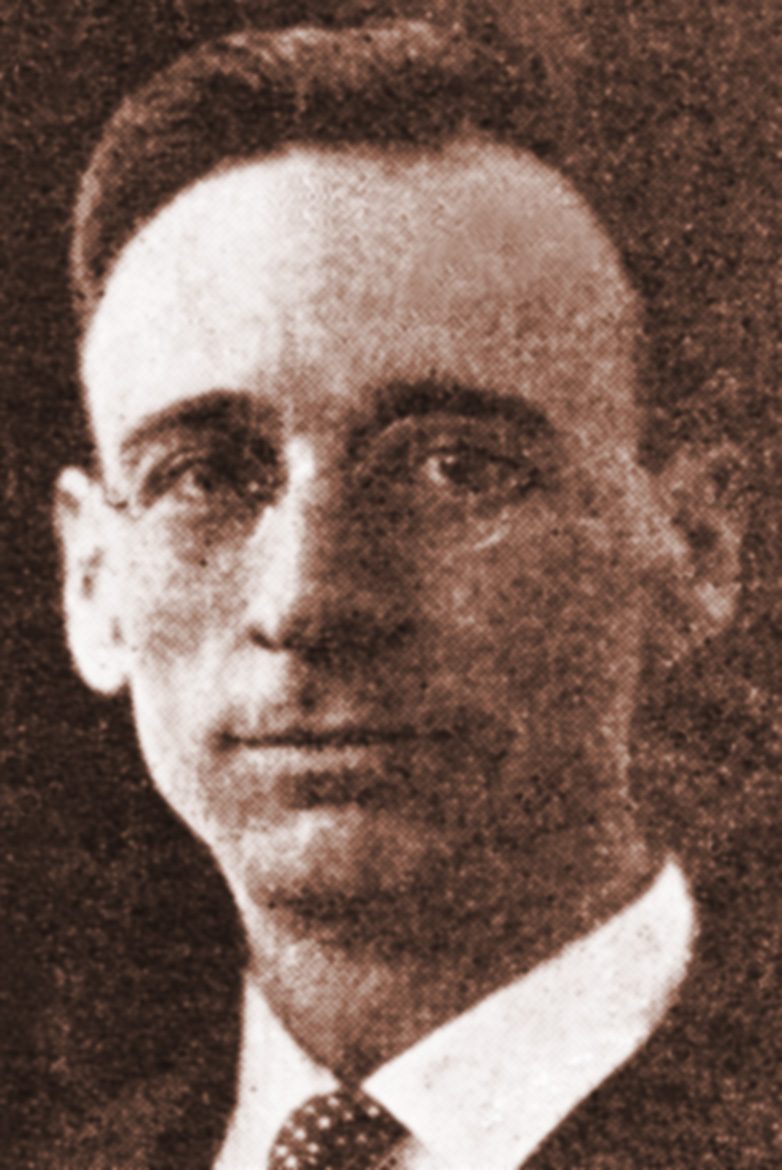
Muste c. 1931

In 1933, Muste's CPLA took the step of establishing itself as the core of a new political organization, the American Workers Party, which was informally referred to as "Musteite" by its contemporaries.

The AWP then merged with the Trotskyist Communist League of America in 1934 to establish the Workers Party of the United States. Muste meanwhile remained a labor activist and led the victorious Toledo Auto-Lite strike in 1934.

== Return to pacifism ==
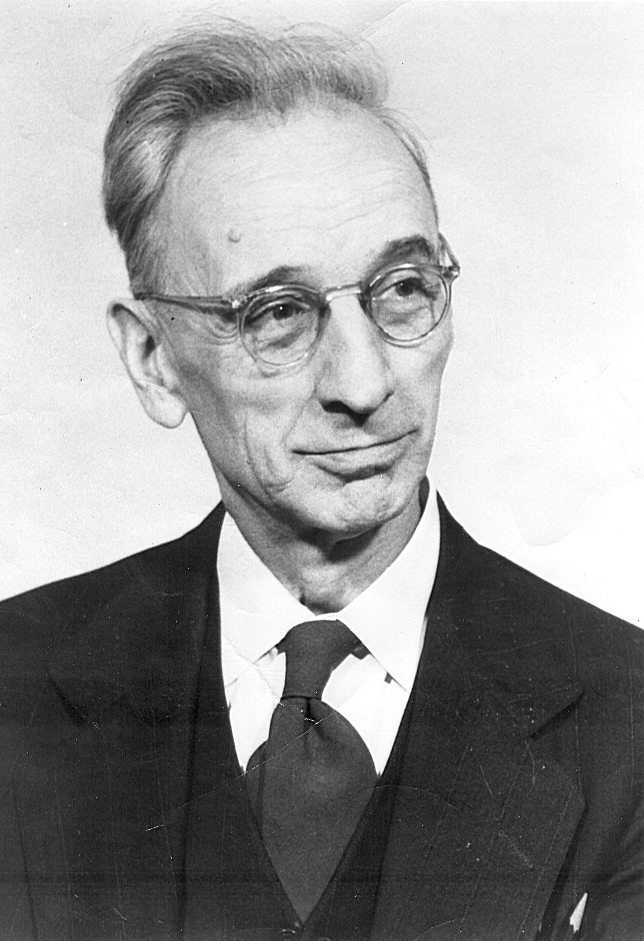
Muste c. 1956

In 1936, Muste resigned from the Workers Party and left socialist politics to return to his roots as a Christian pacifist. He became director of the Presbyterian Labor Temple in New York City from 1937 to 1940 where he paid special attention to combating Marxism and to proclaiming Christianity as a revolutionary doctrine. He also lectured at Union Theological Seminary and Yale Divinity School.

From 1940 to 1953, he was the executive director of the Fellowship of Reconciliation, an influential Protestant pacifist organization, where he did antiwar work, advocated nonviolence within the Protestant ecumenical movement, and helped mentor a number of the future leaders of the Civil Rights Movement, including Bayard Rustin. Rustin, a close advisor of Martin Luther King Jr., later claimed that he never made a difficult decision without talking about it first with Muste.

Muste supported the presidential candidacies of Debs and Robert M. La Follette Sr. and also had close friendships with Dewey and socialist leader Norman Thomas. Muste's support for civil liberties led him to oppose McCarthyism during the Cold War. That led to accusations of communism, although his writings after 1936 are deeply critical of communism.

In 1951, to protest the Cold War, he and 48 others filed Thoreau's essay On the Duty of Civil Disobedience instead of their 1040 Forms.

In 1956, he and David Dellinger founded Liberation as a forum for the pacifist and antiwar left.

In 1957, Muste headed a delegation of pacifist and democratic observers to the 16th National Convention of the Communist Party. He was also on the national committee of the War Resisters League (WRL) and received its Peace Award in 1958. Always a creative activist, he led public opposition with Dorothy Day to civil defense activities in New York City during the 1950s and 1960s.

At the end of his life, Muste took a leadership role in the movement against the Vietnam War. According to legend, he stood outside the White House every night during the Vietnam War, holding a candle whether or not it was raining. In fact, he worked many days and nights during the last two years of his life to build a coalition of antiwar groups, including the Spring Mobilization Committee to End the War in Vietnam, which organized massive protests against the war.

In 1966, Muste traveled with members of the Committee for Non-Violent Action to Saigon and Hanoi. He was arrested and deported from South Vietnam but received a warm welcome in North Vietnam from its leader Ho Chi Minh.

== Death and legacy ==
Muste died February 11, 1967, at age 82. Norman Thomas remembered him as someone who made a "remarkable effort to show that pacifism was by no means passivism and that there could be such a thing as a non-violent social revolution."

The A.J. Muste Memorial Institute was located at 339 Lafayette Street in New York City, the so-called "Peace Pentagon", until the building was sold in 2016 because it required prohibitively expensive structural repairs. The Institute provides office space for various activist groups, which now reside at its new location at 168 Canal Street in Chinatown. Tenant organizations include the War Resisters League and the Socialist Party USA.

During a 1969 debate with William F. Buckley Jr., Noam Chomsky cited Muste as "someone who did take a very strong, and I think very honourable position" on opposing World War II. Chomsky discusses Muste's legacy in American Power and the New Mandarins.

== Works ==
The following selection of Muste's writings may be found in The Essays of A. J. Muste, edited by Nat Hentoff, The Bobbs-Merrill Company (1967).

- "The Problem of Discontent" (first published in Hope College Anchor, 1903)
- "Pacifism and Class War" (The World Tomorrow, September 1928)
- "Trade Unions and the Revolution" (The New International, August 1935)
- "Return to Pacifism" (The Christian Century, December 2, 1936)
- "Sit-Downs and Lie-Downs" (Fellowship, March 1937)
- "The True International" (The Christian Century, May 24, 1939)
- "The World Task of Pacifism" (published as a Pendle Hill pamphlet, 1941)
- "Where Are We Going?" (published as a Fellowship of Reconciliation pamphlet, 1941)
- "War Is the Enemy" (published as a Pendle Hill pamphlet, 1942)
- "What the Bible Teaches About Freedom" (published as a Fellowship of Reconciliation pamphlet, 1943)
- "Germany—Summer 1947" (Fellowship, October 1947)
- "Theology of Despair" (Fellowship, September 1948)
- "Pacifism and Perfectionism" (Fellowship, March and April 1948)
- "Communism and Civil Liberties" (Fellowship, October 1948)
- "Korea: Spark to Set a World Afire?" (published as a Fellowship of Reconciliation pamphlet, 1950)
- "Of Holy Disobedience" (published as a Pendle Hill pamphlet 1950)
- "Mephistopheles and the Scientists" (Fellowship, July 1954)
- "Getting Rid of War" (Liberation, March 1959)
- "Sketches for an Autobiography: Historical Essays, 1891–1960" (serialized in Liberation, 1957–1960)
- "Africa Against the Bomb" (Liberation, January 1960)
- "Saints for This Age" (published as a Pendle Hill pamphlet, 1962)
- "Rifle Squads or the Beloved Community" (Liberation, May 1964)
- "The Fall of Man" (Liberation, June–July 1964)
- "The Civil Rights Movement and the American Establishment" (Liberation, February 1965)
- "Statement Made on 12/21/65 to the Federal Grand Jury"
- "Crisis in the World and the Peace Movement" (Liberation, June–July 1965)
- "Who Has the Spiritual Atom Bomb?" (Liberation, November 1965)
- "The Movement to Stop the Vietnam War" (Liberation, January 1966)

== In popular culture ==
Muste is played by Bill Irwin in the 2023 biopic film Rustin.

== See also ==
- List of peace activists
- Personalism

== Sources ==
- Ira Chernus (2004). American Nonviolence: The History of an Idea, Danvers, Mass., Orbis Books.
- Noam Chomsky, "On the Backgrounds of the Pacific War", Liberation, September–October 1967, reprinted as "The Revolutionary Pacifism of A.J. Muste" in American Power and the New Mandarins.
- Danielson, Leila (2015). American Gandhi: A. J. Muste and the History of Radicalism in the Twentieth Century. Philadelphia: University of Pennsylvania Press. Archived from the original on May 28, 2014.
- Howlett, Charles F. "A.J. Muste: The 20th Century's Most Famous US Pacifist", Friends Journal, April 2006.
- Kosek, Joseph Kip (2009). Acts of Conscience: Christian Nonviolence and Modern American Democracy. New York: Columbia University Press. ISBN 9780231513050.
- Meyers, Jeffrey D., ed. (2016). The Way of Peace: A. J. Muste's Writings for the Church. Eugene, OR: Cascade Books.
- Robinson, Jo Ann O. (1981). Abraham Went Out: A Biography of A.J. Muste. Philadelphia: Temple University Press.
