= Leninist League =

Leninist League can refer to:

- Leninist League (UK), an Oehlerite group.
- Leninist League (US), a communist group which split from the Revolutionary Workers League (Oehlerite)

== See also ==
- Marxist-Leninist League (disambiguation)
