= Ernest Rogers =

British communist

Ernest Rogers (1914–2004) was a Trotskyist activist based in Glasgow, Coventry and London during the twentieth century. Towards the end of his life he was known as the last living Oehlerite.

== Early life ==
Rogers was born in 1914 in Glasgow to a Scottish mother and a father of Jewish and Gypsy ancestry. His mother became a music-hall dancer, meeting Charlie Chaplin and his half brother, Sid. However family pressure eventually led to her withdrawal from the stage. Rogers's father was originally a fisherman, but moved on to become a professional gambler. The Rogers family went to Dublin and were there at the time of the Easter Rebellion.

== Later life ==
After a brief period back in Glasgow, the family moved to Leeds, where Ernest attended meetings by Lew Davies and A. J. Cook. In 1929 the family returned to Glasgow. Here Rogers was influenced by Guy Aldred and became involved in the free speech agitation in defence of tramp preachers. After a period of unemployment he was sent on a work scheme in Parrish Street, where he was involved in a strike. He subsequently went to Edinburgh where he worked for his board and lodging at a bookshop run by Frank Maitland.

In 1931 he started reading The Militant, a radical paper published by the Communist League of America (CLA). By 1932 he became one of the seven founding members of the Glasgow Leninist League. When the debate about entryism split the CLA, Rogers and the Leninist League supported Hugo Oehler and affiliated to the Revolutionary Workers League. From 1937 Rogers was based in Coventry where he organised a second branch of the Leninist League.

During the Second World War, on which the League took a revolutionary defeatist position, Rogers served three months in HM Prison Wormwood Scrubs for identity card offences, after which he retired from political activism.

Rogers was close friends with C. L. R. James, with whose group the Leninist League had discussed a merger, and Raya Dunayevskaya who stayed with him during her trip to England. He became involved with the Revolutionary History group in his later years.
