= Revolutionary Marxist League =

- Abbreviation: RML
- Founded: 1938
- Dissolved: 1940
- Split from: Socialist Workers Party
- Merged into: Workers Party
- Ideology: Trotskyism
- Political position: Far-left

The Revolutionary Marxist League was a small communist party that existed from 1938 to 1939 or 1940 in New York City. It was led by Meldon Joerger and Attilio Salemme.

== History ==
=== Origins ===
In mid-1937 the Joerger and Salemme group held initial discussions on fusing with the Marxist Policy Committee (which itself later joined the Revolutionary Workers League). These discussions failed. Later that year, in the lead-up to the founding of the Socialist Workers Party, and while Salemme and Joerger were still with the Trotskyists around James Cannon, a debate arose in American Trotskyism on the nature of the Soviet Union. Salemme and Joerger offered "the most damning alternative analyses that had yet been advanced within the ranks of the Trotskyist movement. The Salemme-Joerger document, entitled 'The U.S.S.R. and Stalinism', declared that the 'victory of Stalin in the party, the adoption of the theory of 'Socialism in One Country', the expulsion of the Left Opposition and the crushing of the workers' democracy and workers' control, signified that at the head of the U.S.S.R. there ruled a counter-revolutionary group which ruled in the interests of a new Russian bourgeoisie.'" The document went on to declare that the Soviet Union was "capitalist and fascist" and that revolutionaries must "stand for no 'material aid' to the Russian regime in time of war nor to its allies." They also attacked Trotsky as a "juridical cretin" for insisting that nationalized property meant that Stalinist Russia remained a workers state.

=== Split ===
When the Socialist Workers Party was founded in January 1938 with a platform that still considered the Soviet Union to be a degenerated workers' state, Salemme immediately quit the party. Sometime thereafter the Revolutionary Marxist League was founded.

The RML published a mimeographed organ called Revolutionary Action. It apparently ran from Vol. I #1 1938 to Vol. II #1 February 1939.

=== Dissolution ===
Around 1940 they merged with the Marxist Workers League, led by K. Mienov, to form a group called the Workers Party, which nevertheless seems to have been disbanded soon thereafter.

== Ideology ==
The Revolutionary Marxist league's ideological position consisted of a rejection of both Stalinism and Trotskyism, which it regarded as an inverted form of Stalinism. It was equally harsh in its denunciation of the various splinters from official Trotskyism:

We cannot emphasize too much our position that we have nothing in common with the Trotskyite brand of Stalinism or any other inverted form of Stalinism. The various types of Trotskyites (Oehler, Field, Marlen, et al.) ...

== See also ==
- Marxist Workers League (US)
