= Revolutionary Communist Vanguard =

The Revolutionary Communist Vanguard was a Far Left group in the United States. It broke off from the Philadelphia section of the Revolutionary Workers League. Originally known as the "Social Science Circle", it became the Revolutionary Communist Vanguard when the group made its final break with Hugo Oehler. It was "led by a lad named Fleming" and, according to Max Shachtman, had a membership of only 2 people in December 1938. The member or members of the group used a variety of inventive pseudonyms in their bulletins, i.e., Don Quickshot, Obadiah Fairfax, Robin Redbreast, Jerome Rembrandt, and Esther Paris.

It published at least 18 issues of a periodical called Creative Communism and engaged in polemics with the Leninist League. Walter Goldwater doesn't list Creative Communism in his bibliography of radical periodicals, but lists Truth, a Philadelphia paper published by the Revolutionary Communist Vanguard in 1940. He only located one issue, the May 5- June 1, 1940 issue.
