= Joe Thomas (communist) =

British communist activist from London

Joe Thomas (1912–1990) was a communist activist in London during the middle of the twentieth century.

Joe was born to Welsh parents in Cricklewood, London on 27 February 1912. His father was a shop-keeper in the leather trade and an active freemason. Joe attended Haberdashers' Aske's Hampstead School, a local minor public school, to which his father was a supplier. His interest in socialism may have arisen in reaction to this establishment. He was active in the Young Communist League, coming into contact with Tom Mann, John Gollan and John Ross Campbell. By 1933 he was a junior clerical worker for ASLEF in Hampstead.

He visited Campbell in Paris in 1936 and met senior Russian members of the Comintern. He was involved in the Workers' Olympic Committee which planned to organise an alternative to the Nazi Berlin Olympics. The proposal was shelved because of the Spanish Civil War.

In 1945 Joe joined the Oehlerite Leninist League set up by his old comrade Dennis Levin, the group changing its name in the process to the Revolutionary Workers Association, the fused group then reforming in 1947 as the short-lived Socialist Workers League. In the following decade Thomas and Levin formed the Workers League.
