= Benjamin Gitlow =

American politician (1891–1965)

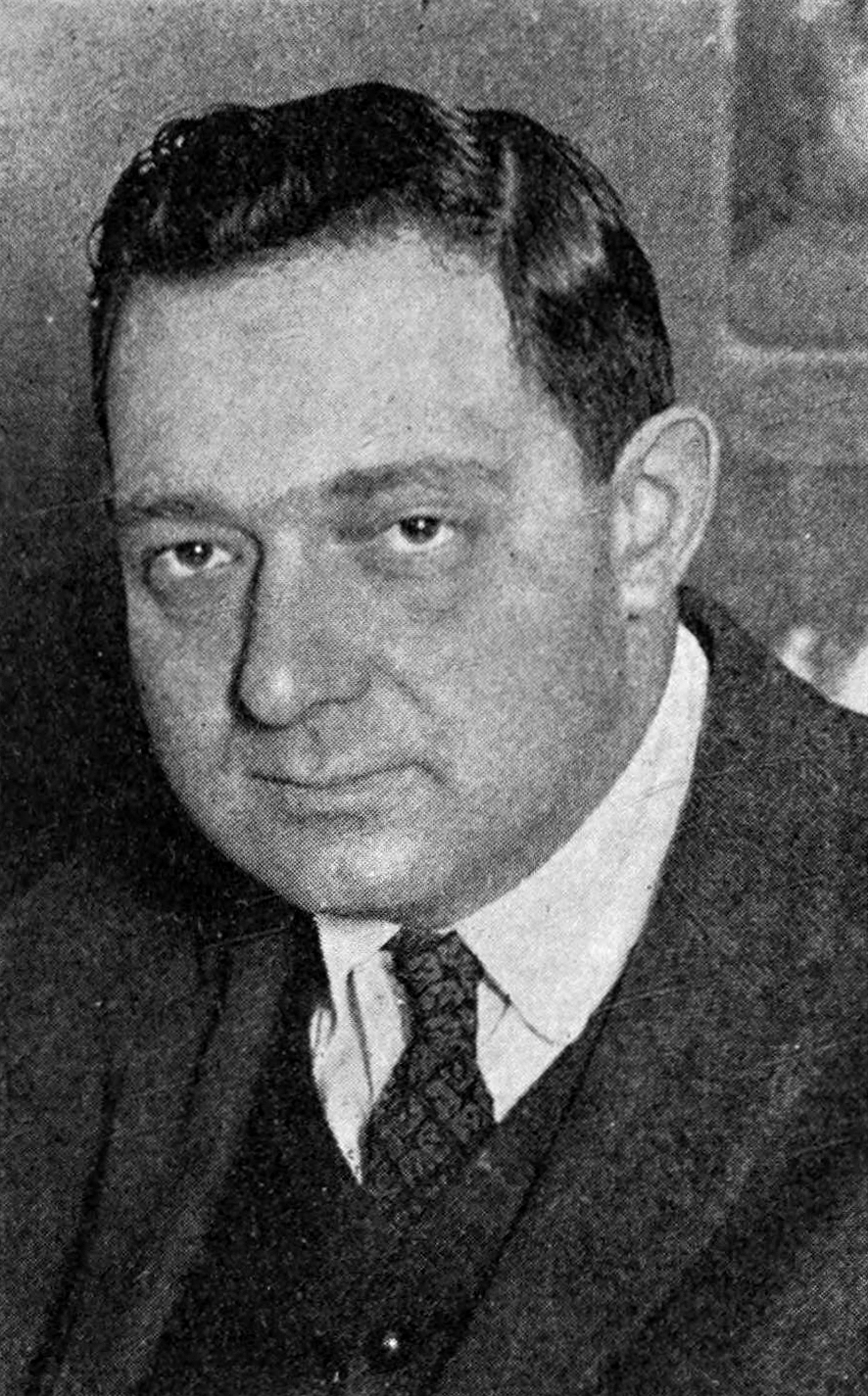
- Portrait by Keystone c. 1924

Member of the New York State Assembly from the 3rd Bronx district
- In office January 1, 1918 – December 31, 1918
- Preceded by: Constituency established
- Succeeded by: Robert S. Mullen

Personal details
- Born: 22 December 1891 Elizabethport, New Jersey, U.S.
- Died: 19 July 1965 (aged 73) Crompond, New York, U.S.
- Party: Socialist (1909–1919, 1934); Communist (1919–1929); Communist (Lovestoneites) (1929–1933); Communist (Gitlowites) (1933–1934); Communist (Fieldites) (1934); Republican (after 1934)
- Other party: Workers (1921–1929)
- Spouse: Badana Zeitlin (m. 1924)

Benjamin Gitlow (December 22, 1891 – July 19, 1965) was a prominent American socialist politician of the early 20th century and a founding member of the Communist Party USA. At the end of the 1930s, Gitlow turned to conservatism and wrote two sensational exposés of American communism, books which were very influential during the McCarthy period. Gitlow remained a leading anti-communist up to the time of his death.

== Early life ==
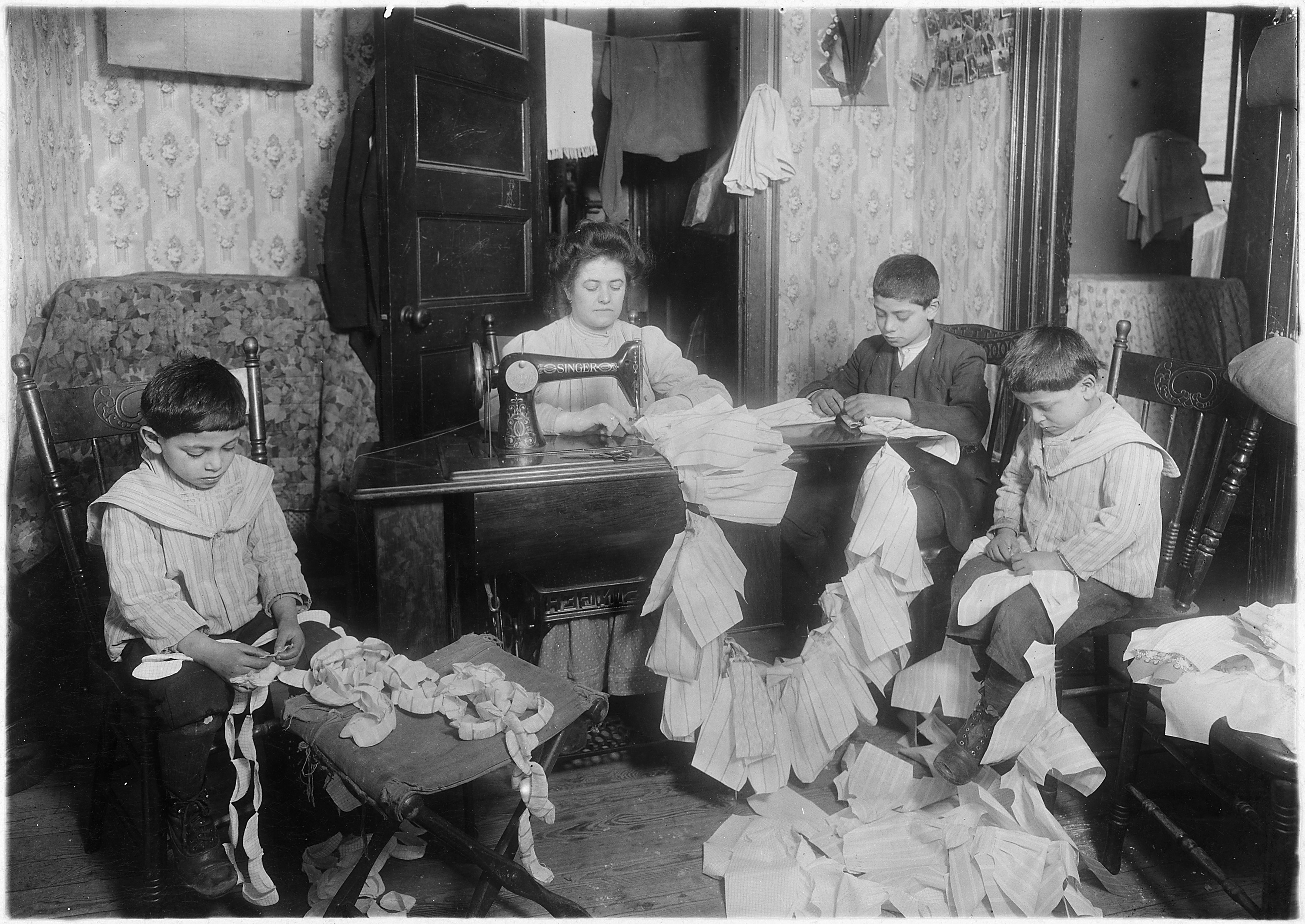
New York City family makes dolls' clothes by piecework (1912)–as did Gitlow's family

Benjamin Gitlow was born on December 22, 1891, in Elizabethport, New Jersey. His parents were Jewish immigrants from the Russian Empire; his father, Lewis Albert Gitlow, moved to the United States in 1888, followed by his mother, Katherine, in 1889. In the United States, his father worked part-time for insufficient hours in various factories, while his mother helped the impoverished family to make ends meet by stitching piecework at home for garment factories.

Radicalism seems to have run deeply in the family. Guests to the family home told stories about their personal and political experiences in Tsarist Russia. Gitlow later recalled this experience as formative to his own political development:

I would listen intently to the adventures of the Russian revolutionary leaders, of their experiences with the police, the days and years spent in prisons and their exile to the wastes of Siberia. I would grow indignant hearing how the Tsar mistreated the people. I thrilled at the stories of the underground movement, of the conspiring activities, how deeds of violence against the Tsarist oppressors were planned... The stories of personal experiences when raids were made by the secret police upon revolutionists' homes held me spellbound. I anticipated every incident that would be related. I also listened to discussions, very idealistic in their essence, in which the participants showed how Socialism would transform the world, and to arguments over methods of how Socialism would be achieved.

In later years, his mother achieved some notice as an important communist women's leader, serving as Secretary of the Women's Committee of the Workers Party of America in 1924. However, she resigned from the party in 1930 and became a bitter opponent of the Stalin regime until her death in 1940.

== Career ==
Gitlow studied law while working as a retail clerk in a department store in Newark, New Jersey. He helped to organize the Retail Clerks Union, political activity for which he was discharged from his job and blacklisted by the Merchants' Association. In June 1914, Gitlow testified before the US Commission on Industrial Relations on conditions prevalent in US department stores. His testimony included descriptions of mandatory overtime, spying on workers, and quid pro quo sexual harassment.

Following his blacklisting from the retail sales industry, Gitlow worked briefly as a cutter in the garment industry before entering the world of radical journalism in 1919.

=== Entry into radical politics ===
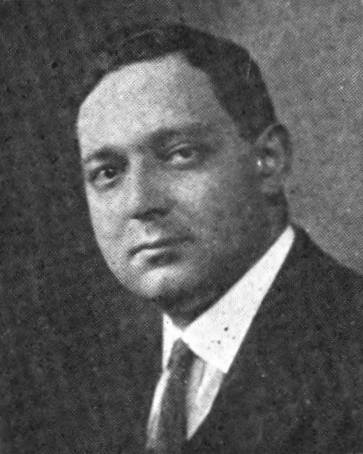
Gitlow's official State Assembly portrait, 1918

As soon as he turned 18 and became eligible for membership, Ben Gitlow joined the Socialist Party of America. Gitlow was a committed and active member of the party and he was elected a delegate to the New York state convention of the SPA in 1910, the year after his joining. In the fall of 1917, Gitlow was elected on the Socialist ticket to the New York State Assembly (Bronx Co., 3rd D.), and sat in the 141st New York State Legislature. He was one of 10 Socialists elected to the Assembly of 1918, all of them from New York City.

Despite (or perhaps because of) his year as a Socialist parliamentarian, Ben Gitlow professed a belief in revolutionary socialism. From its earliest days in 1919, Gitlow was an adherent of the proto-Communist Left Wing Section of the Socialist Party, working closely with renowned radical journalist and war correspondent John Reed. In April 1919, the Left Wing Section of the Socialist Party of Local Greater New York established an official weekly newspaper called The New York Communist. Reed was named the editor of the new publication, with Maximilian Cohen handling the day-to-day operations of the publication as its business manager. Effective with the June 14, 1919, issue, Max Cohen exited the scene and Ben Gitlow assumed the post of business manager.

Following the Left Wing National Conference in June 1919, Reed's New York Communist was merged with the older and better established newspaper of the Left Wing Section of the Socialist Party, Local Boston, The Revolutionary Age, edited by Louis C. Fraina. This publication was moved to New York and thereafter recognized as the "National Organ of the Left Wing Section, Socialist Party," with the former New Yorker Fraina continuing as editor and Ben Gitlow taking over as business manager.

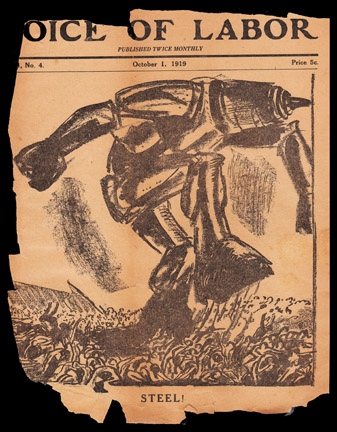
Cover of October 1919 issue of Voice of Labor, issued by the Communist Labor Party

John Reed was named the editor of the a new monthly labor magazine of the Left Wing Section, called Voice of Labor. Ben Gitlow also served as business manager of this publication, which was adopted by the Communist Labor Party in the fall, shortly before its termination due to lack of finances.

=== Arrest and trial ===
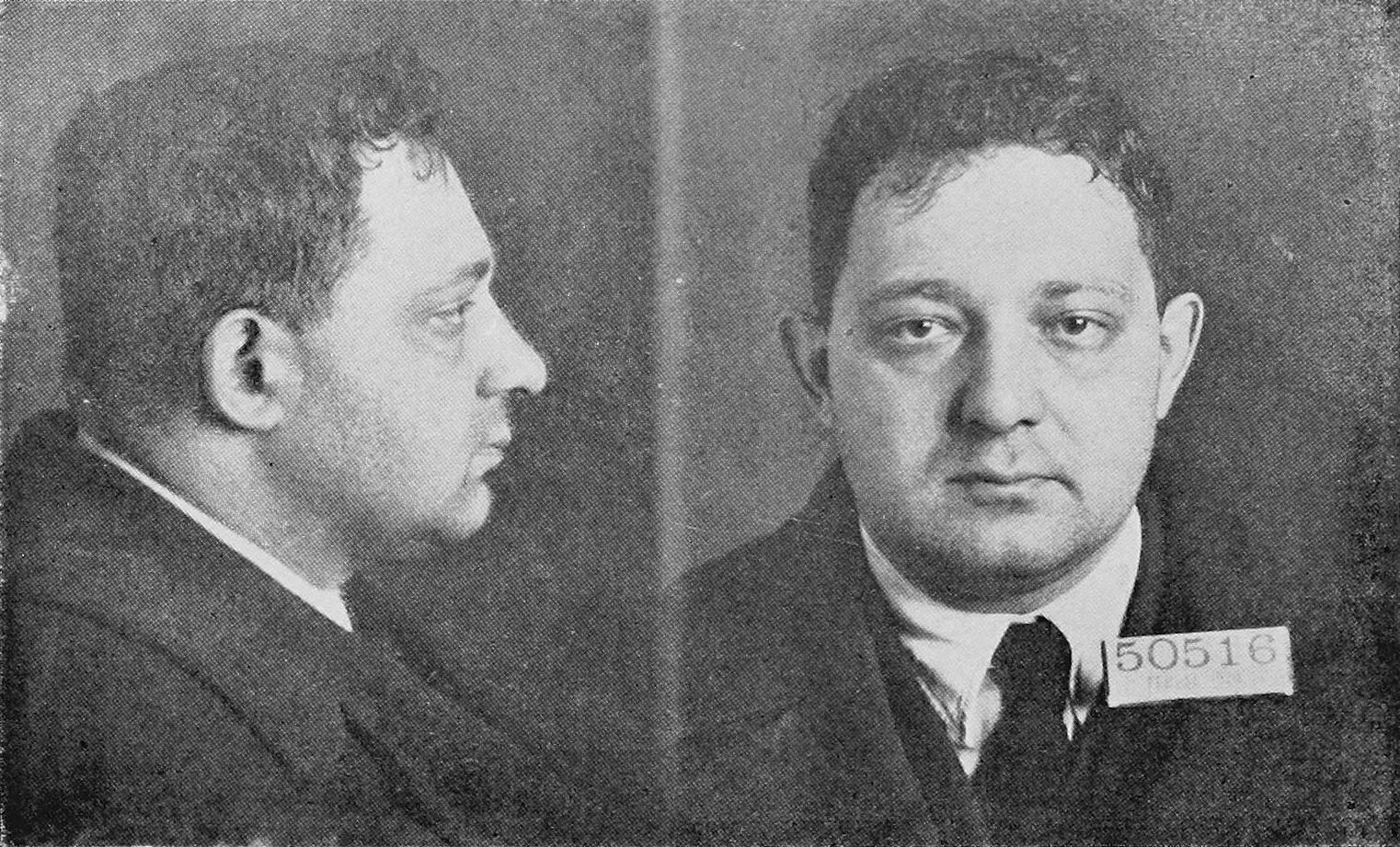
Gitlow's mugshot following his arrest in 1919

For his publicized connection on the staff of The Revolutionary Age Benjamin Gitlow was targeted for arrest during the coordinated raid of the communist movement conducted by New York state authorities and the Department of Justice during the night of November 7/8, 1919. Gitlow was charged with violation of the New York Criminal Anarchy Law of 1902, which made it a crime to encourage the violent overthrow of government. It was contended that the publication of the Left Wing Manifesto by The Revolutionary Age earlier that year constituted such illegal action.

Ben Gitlow's widely publicized trial began in New York City on January 22, 1920, and went to the jury on February 5. Gitlow addressed the jury in his own defense in the case, saying:

I am charged in this case with publishing and distributing a paper known as The Revolutionary Age, in which paper was printed a document known as the Left Wing Manifesto and Program. It is held that that document advocates the overthrow of government by force, violence, and unlawful means. The document itself, the Left Wing Manifesto, is a broad analysis of conditions, economic conditions, and historical events in the world today. It is a document based upon the principles of socialism from their earliest inception. The only thing that the document does is to broaden those principles in the light of modern events.... The socialists have always maintained that the change from capitalism to socialism would be a fundamental change, that is, we would have a complete reorganization of society, that this change would not be a question of reform; that the capitalist system of society would be completely changed and that that system would give way to a new system of society based on a new code of laws, based on a new code of ethics, and based on a new form of government. For that reason, the socialist philosophy has always been a revolutionary philosophy and people who adhered to the socialist program and philosophy were always considered revolutionists, and I as one who maintain that, in the eyes of the present day society, I am a revolutionist.

The attempt of the Gitlow defense to declare the publication of the Left Wing Manifesto an expression of historical analysis rather than an act of practical advocacy was unsuccessful, however. Gitlow was convicted of the charge against him and on February 11, 1920, was sentenced to 5 to 10 years in prison. He served over two years at Sing Sing prison before being released on bail related to his filing of a writ of error. Gitlow's appeal motion was ultimately granted on December 13, 1922, followed by further hearings by the state.

=== Political activity after prison ===
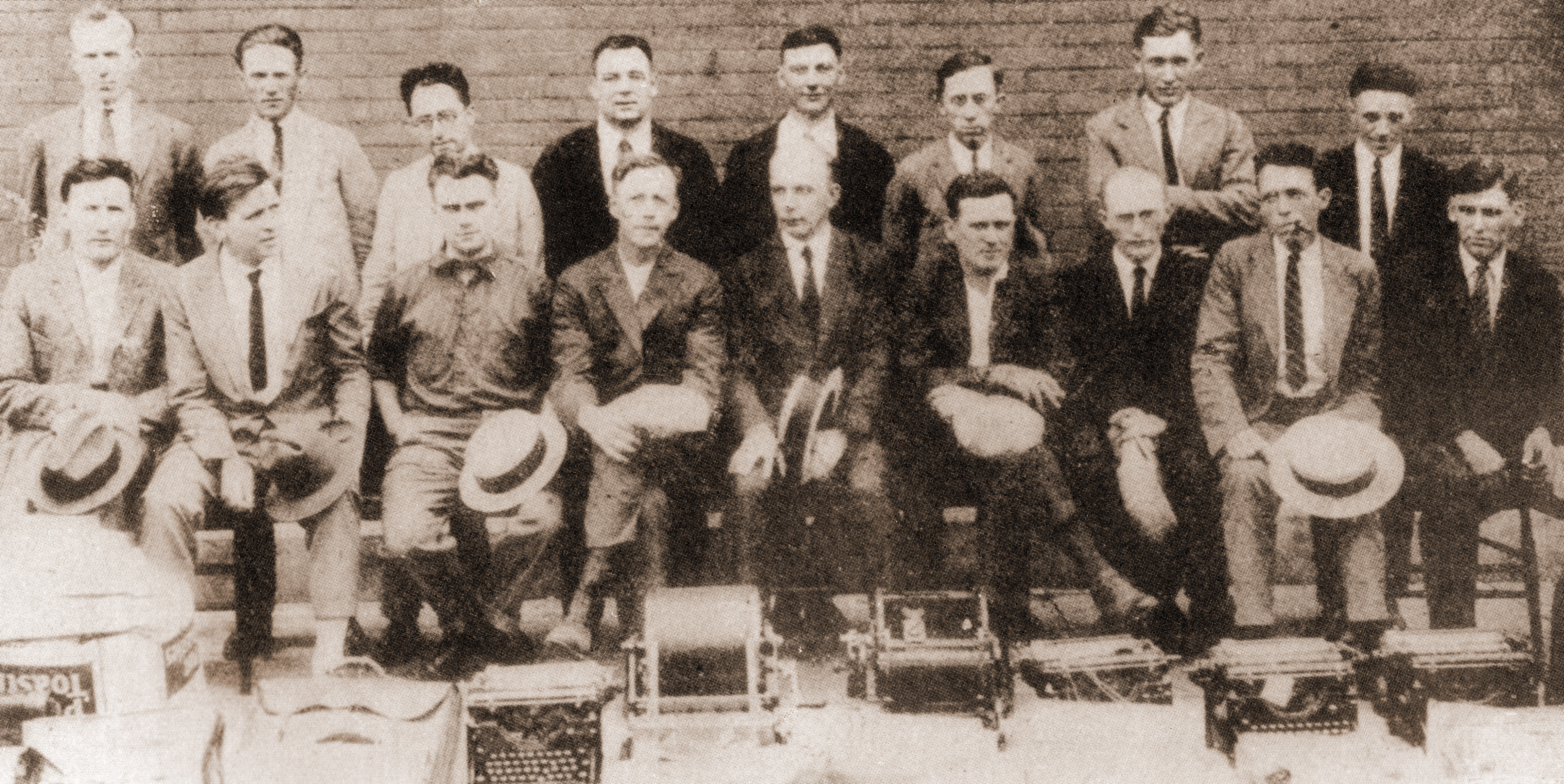
Among those arrested during 1922 Bridgman raid: Back row, L-R: T. J. O'Flaherty, Charles Erickson, Cyril Lambkin, Bill Dunne, John Mihelic, Alex Bail, W. E. "Bud" Reynolds, "Francis Ashworth": Seated L-R: Norman Tallentire, Caleb Harrison, Eugene Bechtold, Seth Nordling, C. E. Ruthenberg, Charles Krumbein, Max Lerner, T. R. Sullivan, Elmer McMillan

Following his release from prison on bail in the spring of 1922, Ben Gitlow was made a full-time employee of the Communist Party of America. The governing Central Executive Committee named him as Industrial Organizer (party organizer in the unions) for a large area which stretched from New York City to Philadelphia and which encompassed the entire New England region.

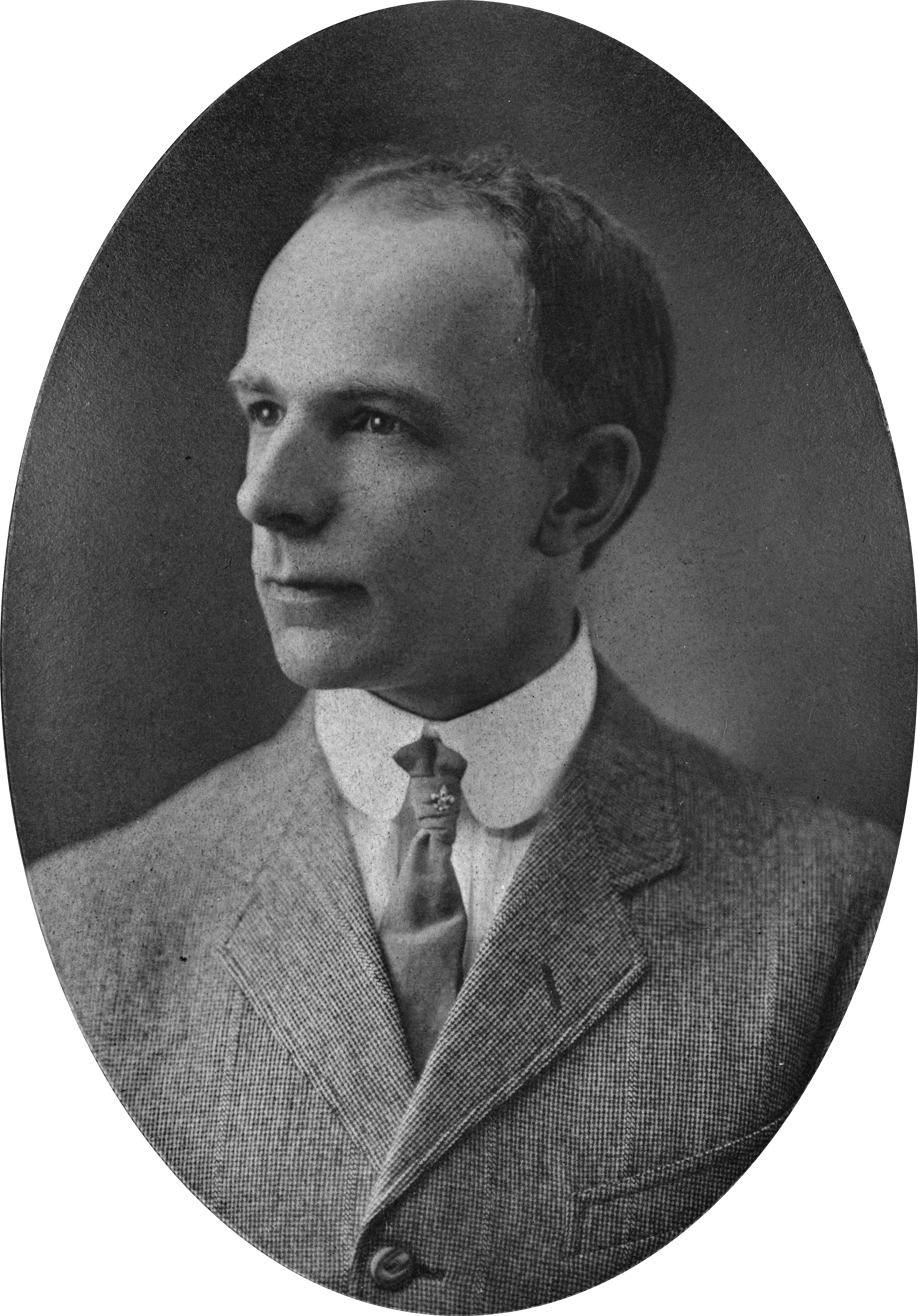
C. E. Ruthenberg (1910) led the Communist Party that Gitlow helped co-found

He was elected as a delegate to the Communist Party's ill-fated August 1922 convention held at Bridgman, Michigan, a gathering which was infiltrated by a Justice Department spy and raided by police. Gitlow was arrested and jailed in the aftermath, eventually released on bail. Ultimately, only 2 of the delegates to this convention were tried, trade union leader William Z. Foster (freed when the jury failed to agree) and Workers Party Executive Secretary C. E. Ruthenberg, who was convicted but who died before appeals were finalized and the sentence imposed.

From May 1923 until early in 1924, Gitlow — a devoted partisan of the party faction headed by C. E. Ruthenberg and an opponent of the faction headed by William Z. Foster — was named the editor of the Workers' Party's Yiddish language daily, the Morgen Freiheit, this despite the American-born and educated Gitlow's faltering familiarity with the language. The appointment was political in nature and Gitlow was removed from the paper as soon as the Foster faction achieved majority control of the party apparatus.

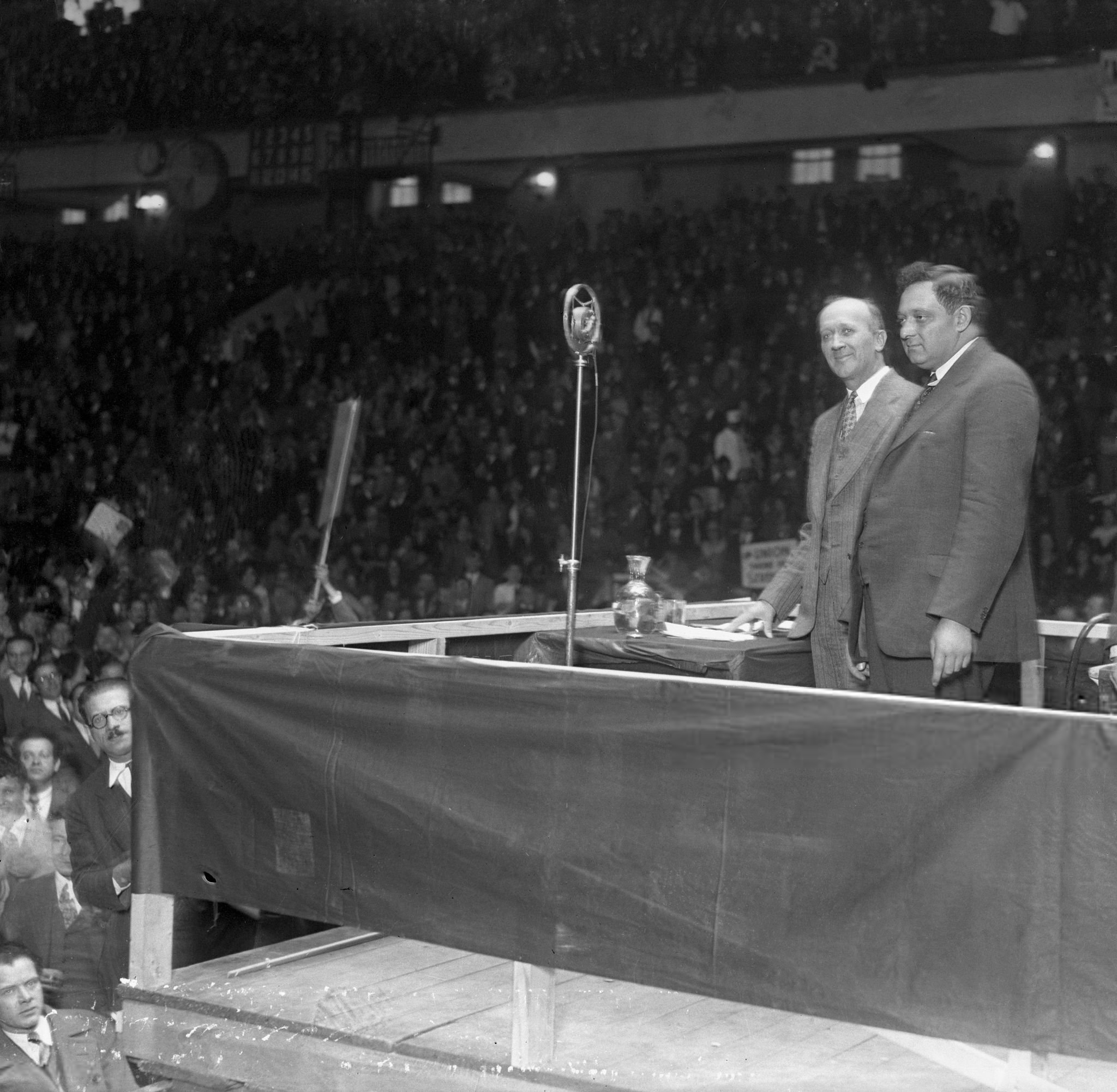
Presidential candidate William Z. Foster with Vice Presidential candidate Benjamin Gitlow at a Workers Party rally at Madison Square Garden, 1924 or 1928

In 1924, Gitlow was named the candidate of the Workers Party of America for Vice President of the United States.

=== Return to prison ===
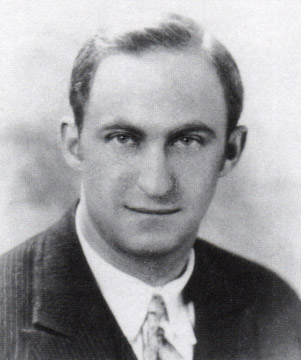
Jay Lovestone, to whose faction Gitlow belonged

Three years after his release on bail, on June 8, 1925, the US Supreme Court upheld his conviction in the case of Gitlow v. New York, by a vote of 7 to 2, confirming that the publication of the Left Wing Manifesto in The Revolutionary Age did, in fact, constitute a punishable act under the law. As the legal wrangling and backstage politics continued, Ben Gitlow prepared to return to jail.

In November 1925, Gitlow was ordered back to Sing Sing Prison by the court to finish his sentence. This would not be "hard time," however. Gitlow was immediately transferred to a new section of the prison located on a hill, a much more comfortable facility than that in which he had previously been confined. Gitlow was assigned to a cleaning detail that occupied only about one hour of his time. The cells had fresh air, a comfortable mattress, hot water in the basin, and clean, smoothly painted steel walls. Gitlow later recalled that "had a bath been included, it would have been equivalent to a good small room in a modern hotel." Gitlow anticipated a short stay in the facility as the American Civil Liberties Union assured him that it had obtained a verbal commitment from Governor Al Smith that Gitlow would be pardoned expeditiously.

On December 11, 1925, Gitlow's first wedding anniversary, he was visited by his wife, who showed him a letter from an ACLU attorney stating that he would be free to leave Sing Sing on parole if he agreed to the conditions of his release. Gitlow considered this an unfortunate turn of events, as he sought freedom to continue his political activities without the constraint of parole supervision and the threat of a rapid return to jail. Gitlow's wife received word by telephone at that time that his decision on whether to accept a parole was moot, however, as the Governor had decided to grant him a full pardon. Freed from jail the next day, Gitlow arrived by train to a packed Grand Central Station, where he received a rousing hero's welcome from the assembled party members and friends.

In 1926, Gitlow ran on the ticket of the Workers Party of America for Governor of New York.

In 1928, Gitlow was once again named the candidate of the Workers Party of America for Vice President of the United States, running for a second time on a ticket headed by William Z. Foster.

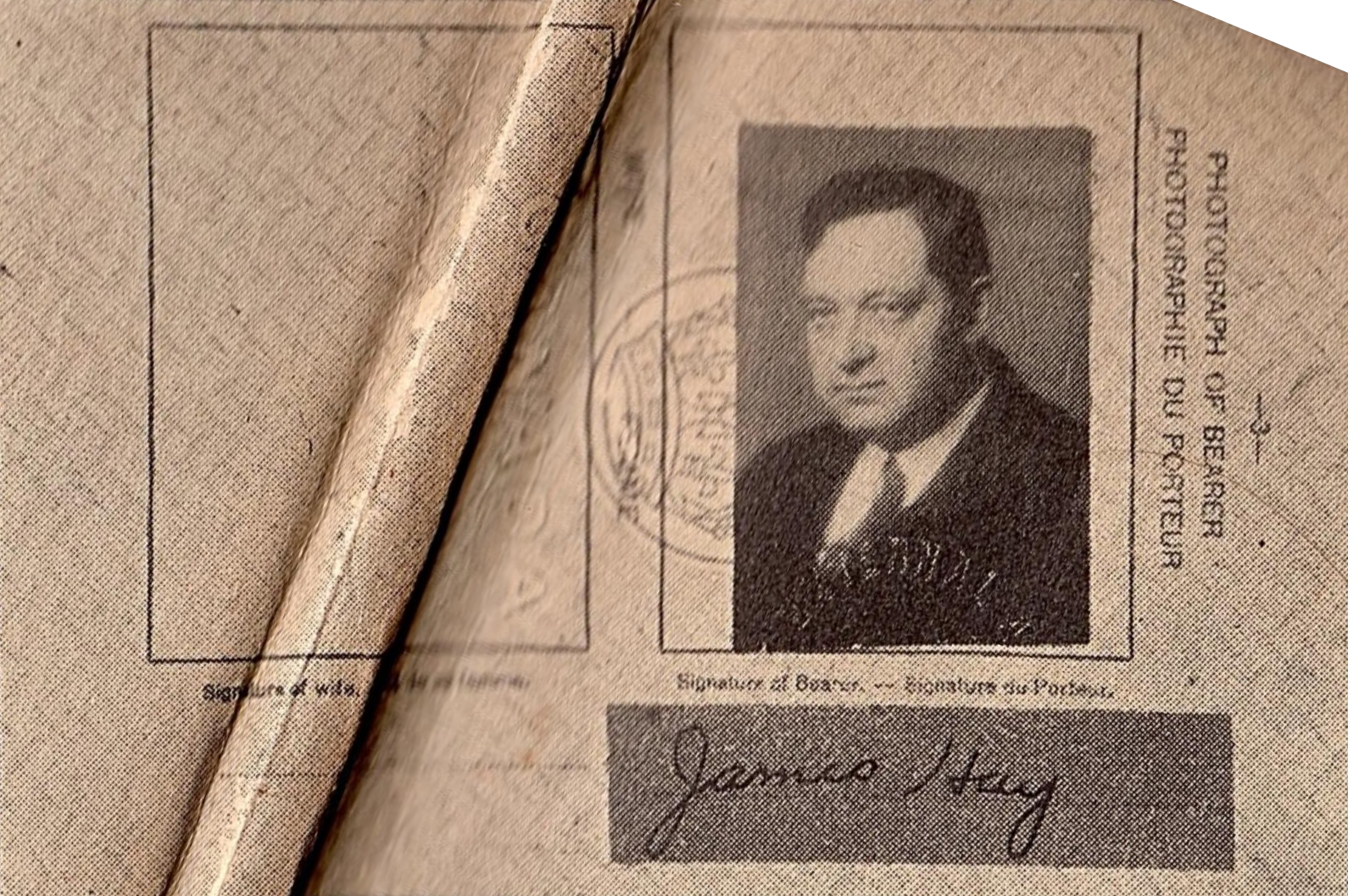
Benjamin Gitlow's Canadian Passport, under the alias "James Hay," used to enter the Soviet Union, 1927

Gitlow reached the summit of his political life as a Communist Party leader shortly after the conclusion of the 1928 campaign, when on March 16, 1929, Gitlow was named to the three-man Secretariat at the helm of the Communist Party, assuming the post of Executive Secretary. His time at the top proved to be momentary, however, as on March 23 he boarded an ocean liner for Moscow as part of a 10-person delegation seeking to appeal the Communist International's (Comintern) decision to expel Jay Lovestone from the Communist Party. The job of Executive Secretary was turned over to factional ally Robert Minor in the interim.

=== Radical oppositionist ===
Logo of the Communist Party of the USA (Opposition) group, which Gitlow co-founded with Jay Lovestone in 1929

In 1929, communist parties around the world were purged of so-called "Right Oppositions" by the Comintern as the world communist movement lurched towards the revolutionary left. Together with his factional co-thinker Jay Lovestone, Ben Gitlow was expelled from the party as purported supporters of Nikolai Bukharin in the USSR in opposition to the hardline faction of Joseph Stalin. The expelled communists followed Lovestone into a new organization, the so-called Communist Party (Majority Group), which actually included a small fraction of the membership of the regular Communist Party.

Gitlow was named a member of the governing National Council of the CP (MG) in October 1929. At the 1st National Conference of the organization, held July 4–6, 1930 in New York City, Gitlow was elected Secretary of the Lovestone political organization, a role in which he continued at least through 1932. In the fall of 1930, Gitlow was sent on a month-long tour of the United States on behalf of the Lovestoneites, taking him to Detroit, Chicago, and Superior, Wisconsin, before returning to the east coast.

Throughout the first 5 years of its existence the Lovestone organization continued to seek accommodation with the regular Communist Party. Gitlow's own views had gradually changed, however. In May 1933 he and Lazar Becker split from the Lovestoneites to found the Workers Communist League, which in turn merged with a group around B.J. Field to form the Organization Committee for a Revolutionary Workers Party the next year.

=== Anti-Communist years ===
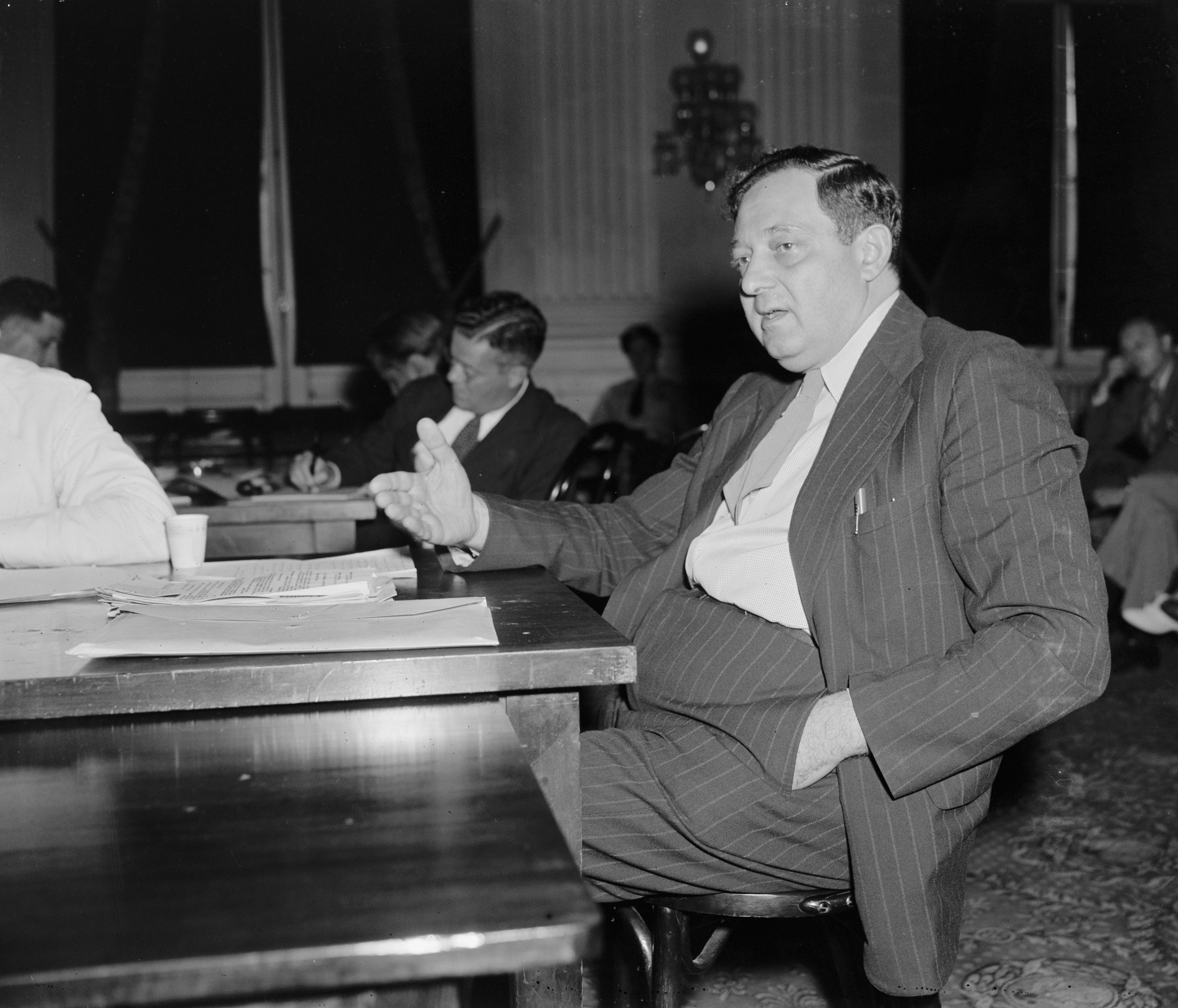
Gitlow testifies before the Dies Committee, September 7, 1939

After briefly rejoining the Socialist Party in 1934, Gitlow became disillusioned with radicalism of all shades and emerged as an outspoken anti-communist. In 1939, he publicly rejected the Communist Party in testimony before the House Committee on Un-American Activities, chaired by Martin Dies, Jr. of Texas.

In 1940, Gitlow published his first work of political autobiography, I Confess: The Truth About American Communism. The book was controversial and widely noticed, pushing Gitlow into the public eye as a leading opponent of American communism. The book remains an important primary document for the study of American communism in the 1920s and 1930s.

In 1948, Gitlow followed his 1940 memoir with a steamier retelling of old tales called The Whole of Their Lives: Communism in America. Non-specialists should use the historical accounts in this later book, written as a potboiler for the popular market, with great caution as some of its details are at variance with the same stories told by the same author nearly a decade earlier. Also in 1948, he joined the American Jewish League Against Communism.

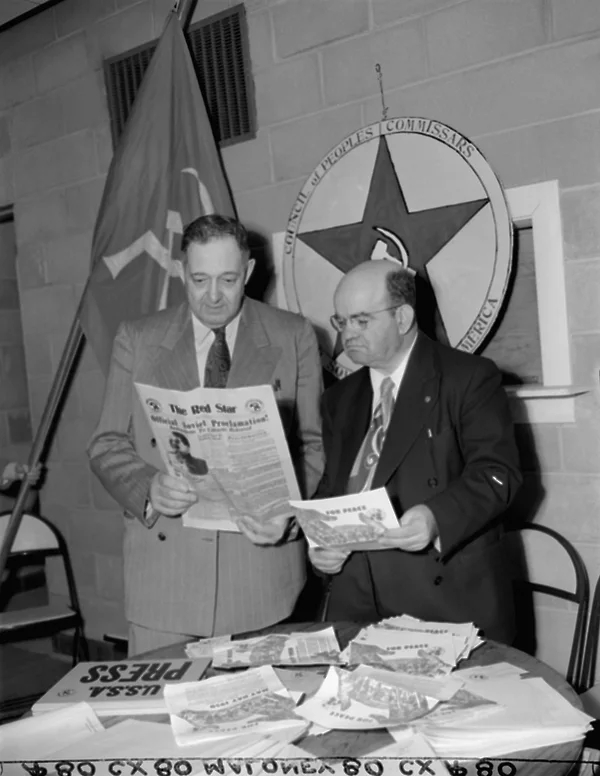
"Benjamin Gitlow, left, who will be the general secretary of the Communist party, and Joseph Zack Kornfedder look at a copy of 'Red Star,' which will be the official paper as the American Legion stages 'Communist Day,' April 30, 1950, in Mosinee, Wisconsin. Both are ex-Communists who volunteered to help stage anti-Communist programs."

On May 1, 1950, in Mosinee, Wisconsin, a local American Legion outpost staged a mock communist takeover to illustrate what life under Soviet conquest might be like. Gitlow played the role of General Secretary of the "United Soviet States of America", while ex-communist Joseph Zack Kornfeder played the new commissar of the newly renamed town of "Moskva". A Soviet flag flew in front of the American Legion outpost.

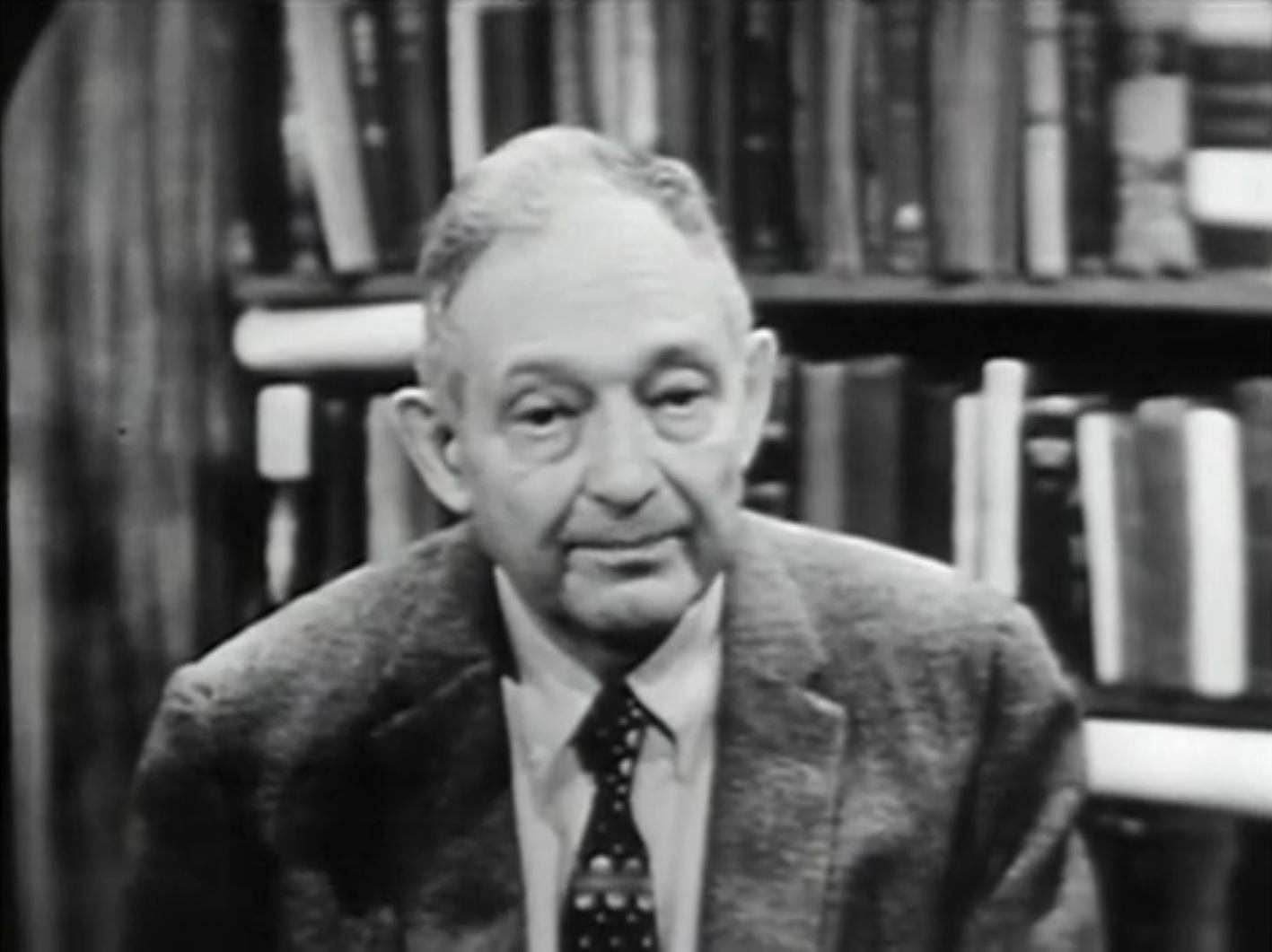
Gitlow in a 1961 episode of Red Myth on KQED

Ben Gitlow's final pamphlets, written in the early 1960s, were published by fundamentalist preacher Billy James Hargis's Christian Crusade Ministries, an organization committed to stopping the spread of Communism in the world. He also sat on the "Co-ordination of Conservative Efforts" committee of Hargis' Anti-Communist Liaison organization.

== Personal life and death ==
In 1924, Gitlow married Badana Zeitlin.

Benjamin Gitlow died in Crompond, New York, on July 19, 1965.

Gitlow's papers are housed at the Hoover Institution Archives, located at Stanford University in Palo Alto, California, and at the University of North Carolina at Charlotte.

== Publications by Benjamin Gitlow ==
- The "Red Ruby": Address to the Jury; Also, Darrow; The Judge; Giovanitti. n.c. [New York]: Communist Labor Party of America, n.d. [1920].
- Acceptance speeches. With William Z. Foster. New York: Workers Library Publishers, 1928.
- Some Plain Words on Communist Unity. New York: Workers Age Publishing Association, n.d. [1932]. alternate link
- America for the People!: Why We Need a Farmer Labor Party. New York: Labor Party Association, 1933.
- Why the Boycott of Nazi Germany? London: British Section of the World Non-Sectarian Anti-Nazi Council to Champion Human Rights, n.d. [middle 1930s].
- I Confess: The Truth About American Communism. New York:E. P. Dutton, 1940.
- The Whole of Their Lives: Communism in America: A Personal History and Intimate Portrayal of Its Leaders. New York, Charles Scribner's Sons, 1948.
- How to Think about Communism. Whitestone, N.Y., Graphics Group, 1949. — Illustrated reprint of selections from "The Whole of Their Lives".
- Nikita Sergeyevich Khrushchev and the Downgrading of Stalin. Tulsa, OK: Christian Crusade, n.d. [c. 1962].
- Communism — A World-Wide Failure? Tulsa, OK: Christian Crusade, n.d. [c. 1962].
- The Negro Question: Communist Civil War Policy. Tulsa, OK: Christian Crusade, n.d. [c. 1962].

=== Related publications ===
- Women in politics by Kate Gitlow. New York: United Council of Working Women, 1924.
- Is the Stalin general line correct?. New York: Workers Communist League, 1933.

New York State Assembly
| Preceded by new district | New York State Assembly; Bronx County, 3rd District; 1918 | Succeeded by Robert S. Mullen |
