= Sidney Lens =

American labor leader and author (1912–1986)

- Born: Sidney Okun; January 12, 1912; Newark, New Jersey, U.S.
- Died: June 18, 1986 (aged 74); Chicago, Illinois, U.S.
- Occupations: Labor activist, journalist, author, editor
- Years active: 1930s–1980s
- Known for: Labor organizing; socialist activism; anti-war movement; writings on American labor history
- Notable work: Left, Right, and Center; The Forging of the American Empire; Unrepentant Radical
- Spouse: Shirley Ruben

Sidney Lens (January 12, 1912 – June 18, 1986), also known by his birth name Sidney Okun, was an American labor leader, political activist, and author, best known for his 1977 book, The Day Before Doomsday, which warns of the prospect of nuclear annihilation.

== Early life ==
Sidney Lens was born Sidney Okun on January 12, 1912, in Newark, New Jersey, to Charles and Sophie Okun, Jewish immigrants from Russia who had arrived in the United States in 1907. His father, who was a pharmacist, died when Lens was three years old, and he was raised by his single mother who worked long hours in the New York City garment industry. Lens changed his name in the early 1930s.

Raised in the Lower East Side neighborhood in New York City, Lens attended Rabbi Jacob Joseph School and DeWitt Clinton High School. He briefly enrolled at New York University night school, but left without a degree.

== Career ==
Lens became a socialist in the early 1930s, and joined the American Workers Party (Trotskyist) in 1934. He focused on union organizing as the primary vehicle for revolutionary change. Lens helped organize department store and auto workers in the 1930s, and participated in the Flint sit-down strike in 1936.

Lens joined Hugo Oehler’s breakaway Revolutionary Workers League (RWL) in 1936, and relocated to Chicago as a full-time revolutionary. He wrote for party publications and produced Marxist pamphlets, but he also criticized factionalism and sectarian splits within the Trotskyist movement. He acknowledged later that the RWL failed due to ideological rigidity and lack of growth. The RWL dissolved in 1948.

Lens worked as a union organizer in Chicago through the 1940s, although he was critical of American Federation of Labor (AFL) corruption and backroom deals. He helped establish and lead a Congress of Industrial Organizations (CIO) local, and later moved it into an AFL affiliate. Lens worked as a union director into the late 1960s. He opposed the wartime “no-strike pledge” as a concession to capitalism. Ultimately, Lens became disillusioned with the centralized business unionism in both the AFL and the CIO.

Lens was active in the anti-war movement during the Vietnam War. Among those he was influenced by was the Dutch-American pacifist A.J. Muste. In 1967, he was among more than 500 writers and editors who signed the "Writers and Editors War Tax Protest" pledge, vowing to refuse to pay the 10% Vietnam War Tax surcharge proposed by president Johnson.

Lens was a contributor to The Progressive and wrote more than twenty books. He ran for public office three times, culminating in 1980 when he was the Citizens Party (United States) candidate for United States Senate in Illinois.

Along with his 1977 book The Day Before Doomsday which warned of the dangers of nuclear war, Lens also wrote a history of U.S. intervention abroad, The Forging of the American Empire, originally published in 1974 and republished in 2003 by Haymarket Books with a new introduction by Howard Zinn; and an autobiography, Unrepentant Radical.

== Personal life ==
Lens married Chicago public school teacher and fellow progressive Shirley Rubin in 1946. He had no children.

== Death and legacy ==
Lens died from melanoma in Chicago on June 18, 1986. His archives are preserved by the Chicago History Museum Research Center. The Sidney Lens Photograph Collection is held in the University Library at California State University, Northridge. This collection consists of photographs taken by Sidney Lens, who is depicted in some of the images. Other papers and books related to the legacy of Sidney Lens are also held at the CSUN University Library Special Collections and Archives.

== Bibliography ==
- John Dewey, a Marxian critique [Chicago] Revolutionary workers league, U.S. 1942 written under his birth name, Sid Okun
- Left, Right, and Center (Chicago: Henry Regnery, 1949): explains some of the anomalies of the American labor movement
- The Counterfeit Revolution (Boston: Beacon Press, 1952): why Stalinism, despite its corrupt nature, nonetheless appeals to millions of people in the non-communist world
- A World in Revolution (1956): revolutionary movements around the world, based on extensive travels
- The Crisis of American Labor (1959), which theorized that anti-communist purges had robbed the labor movement of its higher ambitions
- Working Men (1960): a history of labor, for young people
- Africa, Awakening Giant for young people
- The Futile Crusade: Anti-Communism as American Credo (1964): how American foreign policy was being hobbled by equating liberalism and socialism with communism
- A Country Is Born (1964): the story of the American Revolution, for young people
- Radicalism in America (1966): a history of the American left from 1620 to the present
- What Unions Do
- Poverty: America's Enduring Paradox (1969): poverty and anti-poverty programs from the Renaissance to the Great Society
- The Military Industrial Complex (Kahn and Averill, 1970)
- The Forging of the American Empire (New York: Thomas Y. Crowell Co., 1971): American intervention and imperial expansionism throughout its history
- The Labor Wars (New York: Doubleday, 1973): the struggles of the labor movement from the Molly Maguires to the 1930s
- Poverty, Yesterday and Today (1973) a history of poverty for young people
- The Promise and Pitfalls of Revolution (1974)
- The Day Before Doomsday (New York: Doubleday, 1977): On the dangers of nuclear war
- The Unrepentant Radical (Boston: Beacon Press, 1980): Autobiography
- The Bomb (YA; New York: Dutton, 1982): a history of the arms race
- The Maginot Line Syndrome: America's Hopeless Foreign Policy (Ballinger, 1982)
- Strikemakers and Strikebreakers (YA; New York: Dutton, 1985)
- The Permanent War (New York: Schocken, 1987): a shadow, unaccountable American government is committed to maintaining a permanent state of militarism
- Vietnam: A War on Two Fronts (YA; New York: Dutton, 1990)

== See also ==
- List of peace activists
