= Robert S. Mullen =

American politician and lawyer

Robert Stephen Mullen (October 1, 1884 – September 23, 1959) was an American lawyer and politician from New York.

== Life ==
Mullen was born on October 1, 1884, in New York City, New York. His father, Frank Mullen, served as New York City alderman from Washington Heights for three terms.

Mullen attended public school, Morris High School, and the College of the City of New York. He then went to New York Law School from 1903 to 1906. He was admitted to the bar in 1907, and shortly afterwards he was appointed Deputy Attorney General of New York under New York Attorney General William S. Jackson. As Deputy, he was one of the counsel for the Hearst-McClellan recount case. He then served as clerk for New York Supreme Court Justice Samuel Seabury until the latter's election to the New York Court of Appeals. From 1915 to 1918, he was Assistant District Attorney under Bronx County District Attorney Francis W. Martin.

In 1917, Mullen was the Democratic candidate for the New York State Assembly in the Bronx County 3rd District. He lost to Socialist Benjamin Gitlow. In 1918, he ran again with the endorsement of both Democrats and Republicans and was elected. He served in the Assembly in 1919.

Mullen attended the St. Mary Star of the Sea Roman Catholic Church. He was a member of the Elks and the Knights of Columbus. In 1911, he married Ida C. Anderson. Their children were Margaret Roberta, Alice Frances, Robert S. Jr., and Edwin Dingwall.

In 1957, Mullen moved to Kankakee, Illinois. He died at his home there on September 23, 1959.

New York State Assembly
Preceded by Benjamin Gitlow	New York State Assembly; Bronx County, 3rd District; 1919	Succeeded by Samuel A. DeWitt
