= Marxist Workers League (US) =

- Abbreviation: MWL
- Founded: 1938
- Dissolved: 1940
- Split from: Revolutionary Workers League
- Ideology: Trotskyism
- Political position: Far-left

The Marxist Workers League was the name of two splinter groups from the Revolutionary Workers League (RWL) in the 1930s.

== 1936 split ==
The first group split in early 1936. After "a sensational existence of both its members for 19 days", they rejoined the RWL.

== 1938 split ==
The second group formed in early 1938, containing elements from the RWL, Albert Weisbord's Communist League of Struggle, and the Trotskyist YPSL. Its central criticism of the RWL was of its analysis of the Spanish Civil War, which it believed was an imperialist war. Its principal leader was Karl Mienov. Mienov advocated for a revolutionary defeatist position in Spain, rather than the critical support of the Republican government advocated by the RWL, declaring "to be wrong on the Spanish war means to open the door wide open to social-patriotism in the coming imperialist world war... We are proud that we split from such a centrist group."

The MWL published a "theoretical organ" out of New York called The Spark, and then Power, from February 1938 to 1940. According to Walter Goldberg, The Spark lasted from Vol. I #1 Feb. 1938 to Vol. II #3 May 1939.

In 1940, the MWL merged with another small sect, the Revolutionary Marxist League, led by Meldon Joerger, to create a group called the Workers Party. This new sect appears to have died out quickly, such that it had gone out of existence before the Shachtmanite Workers Party was formed in April 1940.

== See also ==
- Revolutionary Workers League (Oehlerite)
- Workers Party (United States)
