= Leninist League (UK) =

The Leninist League was a small Oehlerite organisation set up by Dennis Levin in Glasgow, Scotland in 1932, originally as the Glasgow Leninist League. League members also included Hugh Esson and Ernest Rogers.

August Thalheimer of the Communist Party Opposition (KPO) sent regular reports to the Leninist League while he was in Spain, during the Spanish Revolution.

The League participated in the Glasgow Apprentices Strike of March 1937, after which their base moved to Coventry.

In 1939 they participated in the founding of the Provisional International Contact Commission for the New Communist (Fourth) International alongside:

- Revolutionary Workers League (United States)
- Red Front of Greater Germany
- Revolutionary Communist Organisation (Austria).

During the Second World War the League opposed the war, both before and after the Hitler-Stalin Pact.

In 1944 a split from the Common Wealth Party led by Joe Thomas, the Communist Workers Group, fused with the remnants of the Leninist League as the London-based Revolutionary Workers Association, which remained affiliated with the Oehlerite international. In 1946 the RWA itself split, with Levin and Thomas's group leaving the International and forming the Socialist Workers League (SWL), which lasted until 1951. Some members remained active in the Socialist Workers Group (a London branch of the Federation of Marxist Groups/Socialist Workers Federation associated with Harry McShane and Eric Heffer), and later the Independent Labour Party (ILP) and Workers League, a split from the ILP again led by Levin and Thomas.
