= James P. Cannon =

American leftist politician (1890–1974)

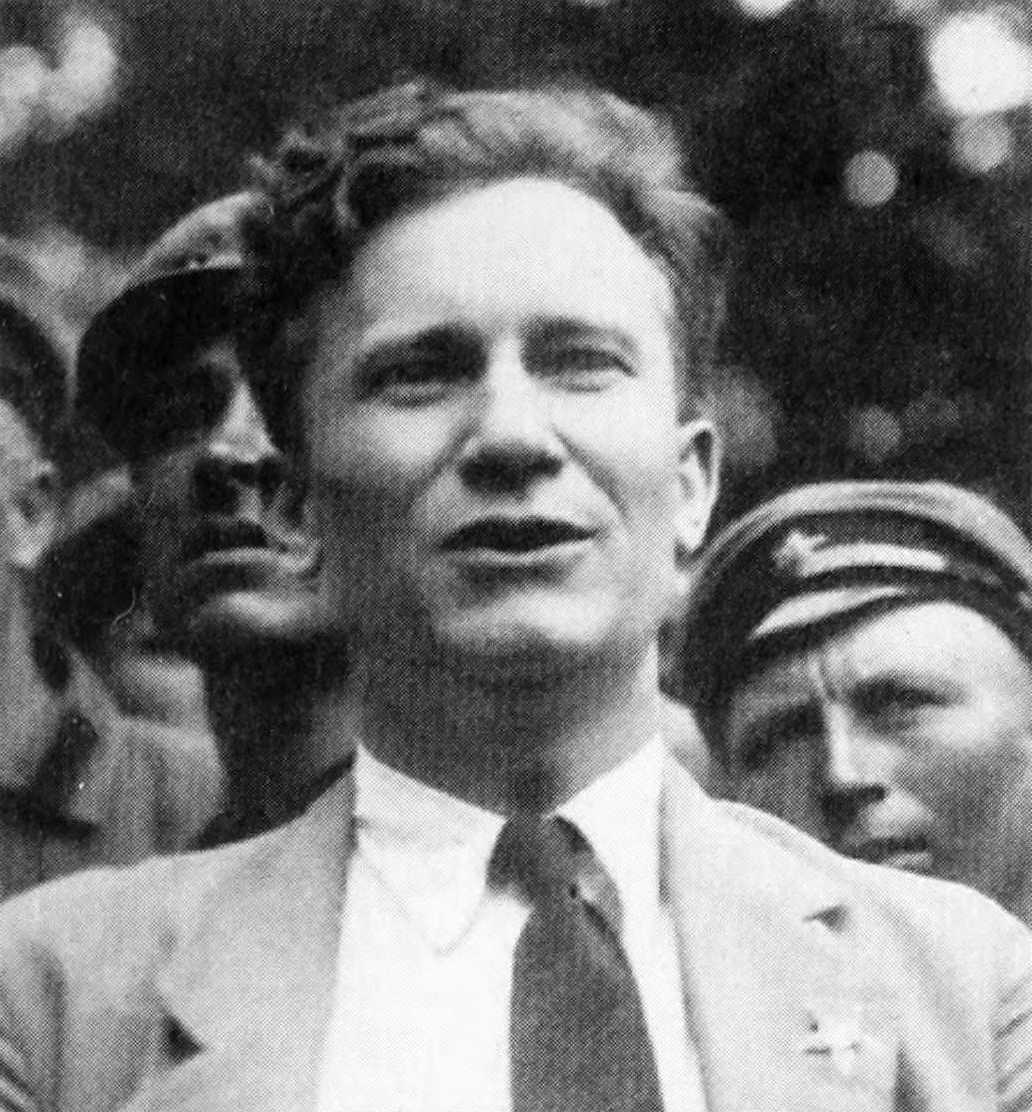
- Cannon with Red Army soldiers at the 6th World Congress of the Comintern, 1928

National Secretary of the Socialist Workers Party
- In office January 1938 – 1953
- Preceded by: Position established
- Succeeded by: Farrell Dobbs

Personal details
- Born: James Patrick Cannon; February 11, 1890 Rosedale, Kansas, U.S.
- Died: August 21, 1974 (aged 84) Los Angeles, California, U.S.
- Party: Socialist (1908–1919, 1936–1937); Communist Labor (1919–1920); Communist (1920–1928); Communist League (1928–1934); Workers (1934–1936); Socialist Workers (1937–1974)

James Patrick Cannon (February 11, 1890 – August 21, 1974) was an American Trotskyist who served as national secretary of the Socialist Workers Party (SWP) from its foundation in 1938 until 1953. Previously a member of the Communist Party of America (CPA), he founded the International Labor Defense in 1925 and served as its first national secretary.

Following his expulsion from the pro-Stalinist CPA in 1928, Cannon helped establish the American Trotskyist movement. He co-founded and led the Communist League of America, which then merged into the Workers Party of the United States. In 1938, he founded the Socialist Workers Party. During World War II, he was imprisoned for opposing America's involvement in the conflict. In 1953, Cannon stepped down as National Secretary and moved to California. At the time of his death in Los Angeles in August 1974, he held the position of national chairman emeritus of the SWP.

== Early life ==
Born on February 11, 1890, in Rosedale, Kansas, Cannon was the son of Irish immigrants with strong socialist convictions. He joined the Socialist Party of America (SPA) in 1908 and the Industrial Workers of the World (IWW) in 1911. He was trained by "Big Bill" Haywood, a top IWW leader, and was an IWW organizer throughout the Midwest from 1912 to 1914.

== Political career ==
=== Cannon in the early Communist movement ===
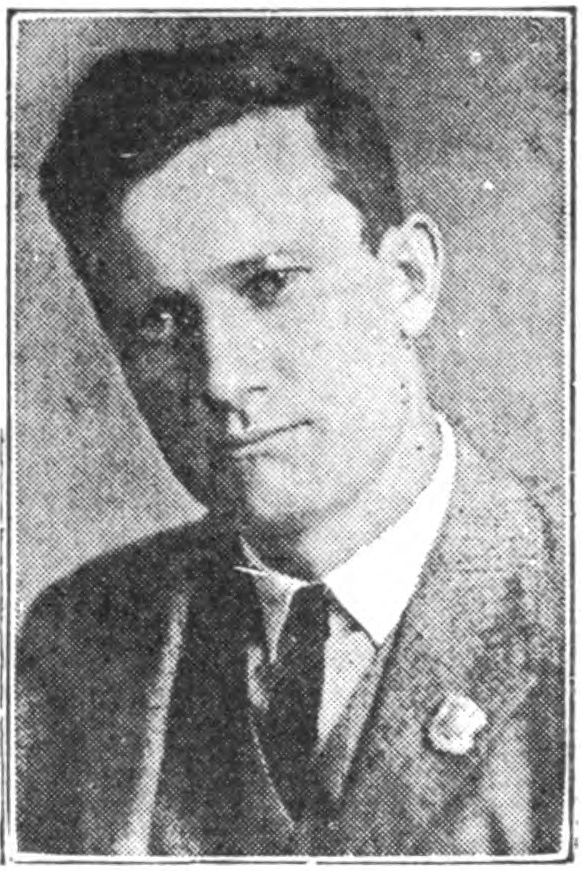
Cannon c. 1926

Cannon opposed World War I from an internationalist position and rallied to the Russian Revolution of 1917. The Bolshevik victory in Russia served to radicalize the Socialist Party of America and brought Cannon back to the organization. He was an active participant in the Left Wing Section of the Socialist Party, an organized faction that sought to transform the SPA into a revolutionary socialist organization. In 1919, he was a founding member of the Communist Labor Party (CLP), forerunner of the Communist Party of America (CPA), although he did not attend the Chicago convention of the CLP due to insufficient party tenure in the SPA. But he was a part of the CLP's leadership from its earliest days, serving as District Secretary of the CLP for the states of Kansas, Missouri, and Nebraska from the time of founding. He was also the editor of the left-wing Kansas City weekly, Worker's World, from 1919 to 1920, assuming the position after fellow Kansas syndicalist Earl Browder was sent to prison for his previous antiwar activities.

In May 1920, the CLP merged with a section of the CPA headed by C. E. Ruthenberg, and Cannon was elected to the new organization's Central Executive Committee by the founding convention. He worked variously as the St. Louis District Organizer of the UCP in the summer of 1920 and as editor of the organization's labor newspaper, The Toiler, in October of that year. This brought Cannon to New York City, where he was able to regularly sit on the meetings of the Central Executive Committee. After the UCP merged with the remaining CPA organization, headed by Charles Dirba, Cannon was named the first Subdistrict Organizer of the unified organization for Duluth, Minnesota.

Cannon was on the executive board of the American Labor Alliance, one of the underground CPA's most important legal organizations, intended to bring mainstream trade unionists into common cause with the persecuted underground communist movement. In December 1921, Cannon delivered the keynote speech to the founding convention of the "legal political party" formed in parallel to the underground CPA, the Workers Party of America (WPA), and was elected national chairman by that convention.

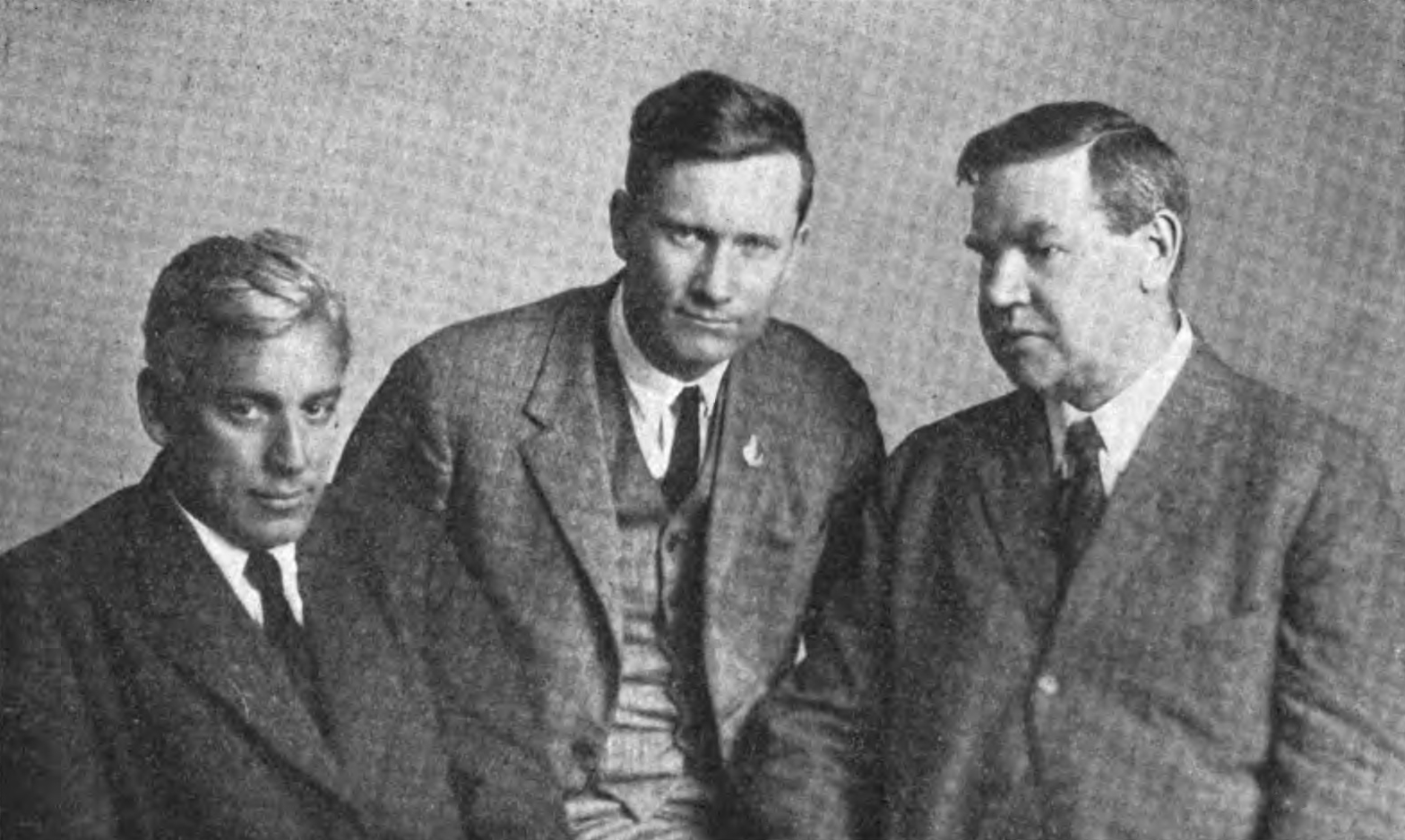
Cannon (center) with Max Eastman (left) and Bill Haywood in Moscow c. 1923

Cannon was elected by the CEC of the unified CPA as delegate of that organization to the Enlarged Plenum of the executive committee of the Communist International (ECCI) and as formal party representative to the Red International of Labor Unions (RILU), leaving the U.S. in mid-May 1922 and arriving in Moscow on June 1. He stayed on there as a delegate of the American party to the 4th World Congress of the Comintern, where he was elected to the ECCI Presidium, serving from August to November 1922. Back in the U.S., Cannon was a member of the executive committee of the Friends of Soviet Russia from 1922. He was also a candidate of the WPA for the United States Congress from the New York 10th District in 1922. Cannon remained on the CEC of the WPA throughout this period.

On January 19, 1924, Cannon was named assistant executive secretary of the Workers Party of America, working under his faction rival, Ruthenberg. He was the WPA's candidate for Governor of New York in 1924, and again returned to Moscow as a delegate of the party to the 5th Enlarged Plenum of ECCI, held in March and April 1925.

Cannon was an important factional leader in the American communist movement of the 1920s, sitting on the governing Central Executive Committee of the party in alliance with William Z. Foster, a Chicago-based group that looked to native-born American workers in the unions. Later in the decade, Cannon broke to an extent with Foster, heading up instead the party's legal defense arm, International Labor Defense (ILD). This organization served as a power base for Cannon and his associates. Cannon was the Workers (Communist) Party's candidate for Congress in the New York 20th District in 1928.

=== Cannon's turn to Trotskyism ===
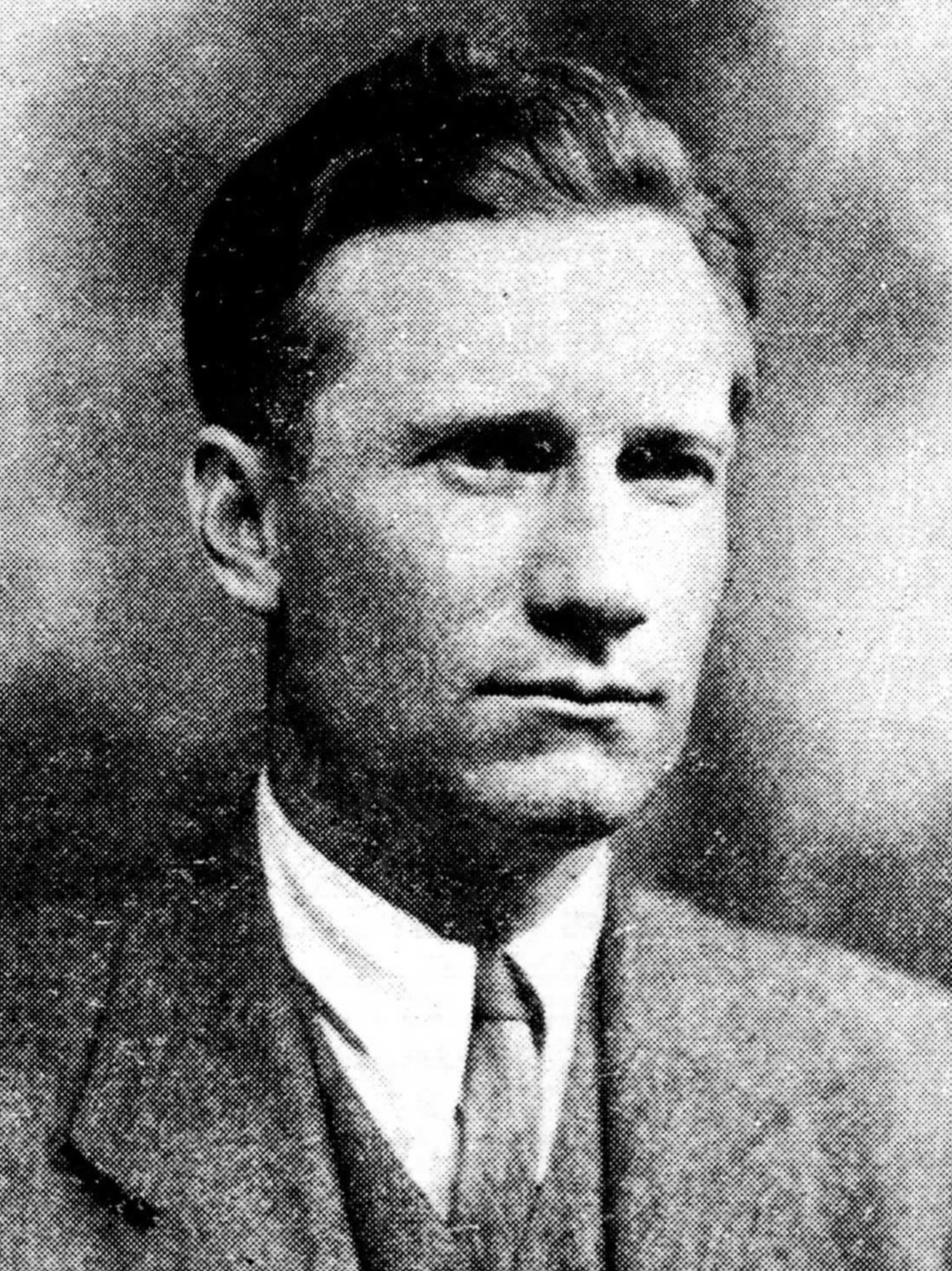
Cannon c. 1923

While in Russia in 1928, Cannon read a critique of the direction of the Communist International written by Trotsky which the Comintern had mistakenly circulated. He was convinced of the arguments, and attempted to form a Left Opposition within the Workers (Communist) Party. This resulted in his expulsion on October 27, 1928, together with his co-thinkers Max Shachtman and Martin Abern.

Outside of the Communist Party, Cannon, Shachtman, and Abern founded a new political party, the Communist League of America and began publishing The Militant. They came to see Hitler's crushing of the communist movement in Germany as evidence that the Comintern was no longer able to play a revolutionary role internationally and, with the remainder of the Third International under Stalin's control, unable to be internally reformed such that a new International and new parties were required.

Concretely this meant that they no longer considered the Communist League to be a faction of the Communist Party but rather considered it the nucleus of a future revolutionary party. It also meant that they were far more inclined to look at working with other sections of the reviving socialist and workers movements from this point forth. Although the Communist League had been a small organization — opponents dubbing Cannon, Abern and Shachtman "Three generals without an army" — it had won a majority of the Communist Party branch in Minneapolis and St. Paul. Therefore, when the labor movement revived in the early 1930s the Communist League was well placed to put its ideas into action in the Twin Cities and through their influence in the International Brotherhood of Teamsters the union rapidly grew after an historic dispute in 1934. Cannon played a major role in this dispute directing the work of the Communist League on a daily basis, along with Shachtman. In December 1934 the Communist League of America merged with pacifist A. J. Muste's American Workers Party to form the Workers Party of the United States.

Throughout 1935 and into 1936, the Workers Party was deeply divided over the so-called "French Turn." The Trotskyist organization in France had entered the country's social democratic party — the Section Française de l'Internationale Ouvrière (SFIO) — and, while maintaining themselves as an organized faction in the broader organization, had made what were felt to be significant gains in advancing their programmatic goals and winning adherents to their cause among young party members. This tactic was subsequently endorsed by Trotsky himself, but the American party was split over the advisability of the maneuver. Cannon was a forceful advocate of the tactic and became embroiled in an inner-party fight to dissolve the Workers Party in favor of entry into the Socialist Party of America. In early 1936, a convention of the Workers Party finally decided that the organization should enter the SP. This decision came at a cost, however, with a left wing faction led by Hugo Oehler refusing to join the Socialists and exiting to form the Revolutionary Workers League. A. J. Muste became disgusted as well and left the radical political movement to return to his roots in the church.

The Trotskyists' stay inside the Socialist Party lasted only from mid-1936 until mid-1937. Admissions were made on an individual basis, rather than en masse. Chicago attorney and devoted Trotskyist Albert Goldman, who entered the SP about a year earlier than his comrades, launched a factionally-oriented newspaper called Socialist Appeal. Meanwhile, Cannon headed west to the Los Angeles suburb of Tujunga to launch a western paper, entitled Labor Action, focused on the trade union movement. Day-to-day operations of the SP's Trotskyist faction during 1936-37 were handled by Shachtman and James Burnham in New York, while Cannon made what he later described as "futile attempts to participate in correspondence in the work of the New York center."

As the factional situation in the Socialist Party intensified at the start of 1937, the decision was made by the hostile New York party organization to expel the Trotskyists, which took place in late spring. A large percentage of the SPA's youth organization, the Young People's Socialist League, likewise dropped out with the Trotskyists. (Those expelled had organized a "Federation of NY Left Wing Branches" of the SP and helped edit and publish Socialist Appeal. This became the Socialist Workers Party newspaper for a number of years after its founding.) Cannon reportedly said that when the SP expelled the Trotskyists, "they had expelled the heart of their party; Trotsky had won over all the serious young activists, leaving only a dead husk".

In the summer of 1937, Cannon returned to New York from California, where he conducted organizational activities which led to the formation of the Socialist Workers Party at a convention held from December 31, 1937, to January 3, 1938. Cannon was elected as the group's first National Secretary. James Cannon later wrote that "Our 'round trip' through the Socialist Party had resulted in gains all along the line. We formed the Socialist Workers Party...and began once again an independent struggle with good prospects and good hopes".

=== Cannon in the SWP ===
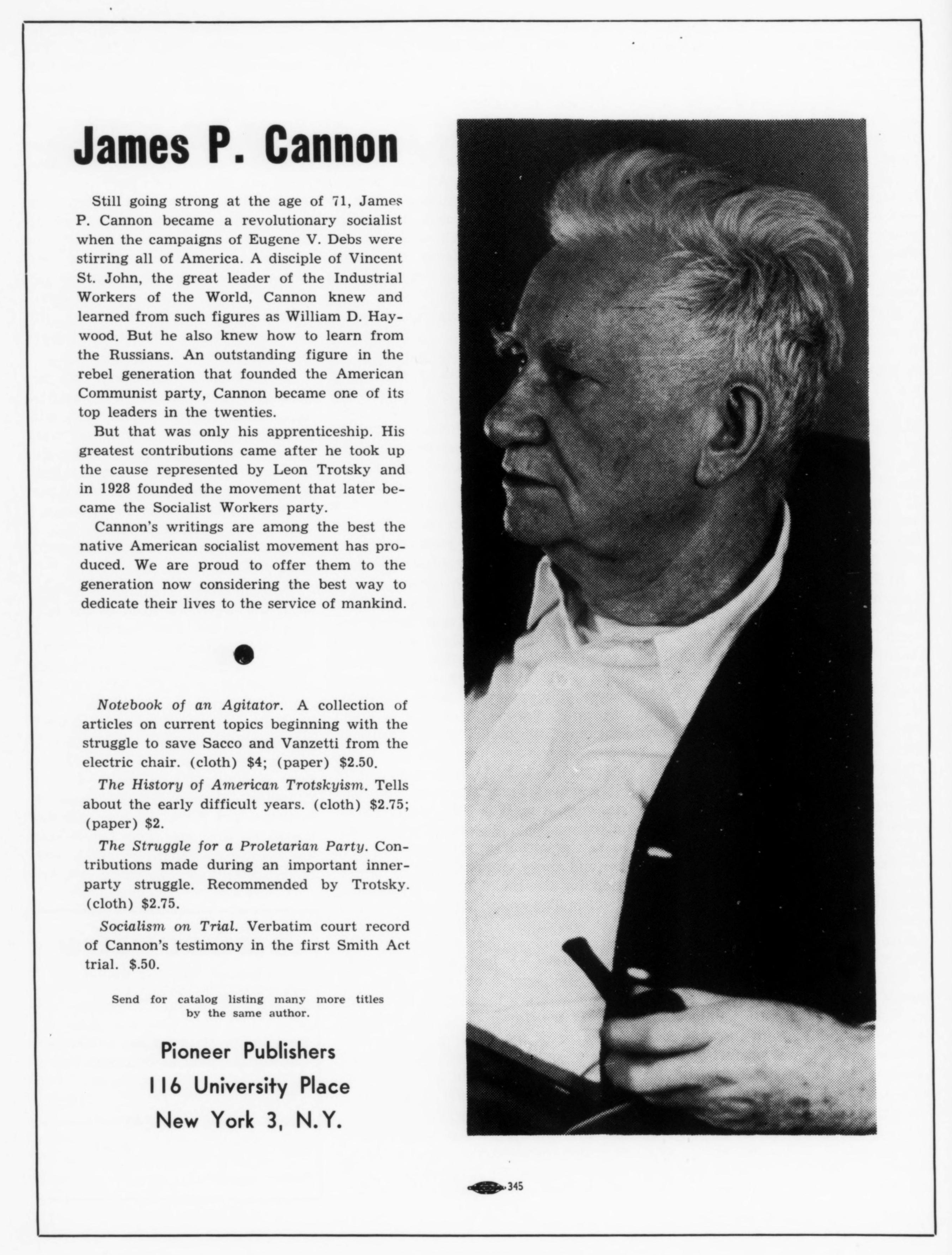
Cannon in the Fall 1961 issue of the International Socialist Review

In addition to his activity in the Socialist Workers Party, Cannon was a leading figure in the Fourth International, the international Trotskyist movement, and visited Britain in 1938 with the intention of aiding the unification of the competing British groups. The result was a patched together unification, the Revolutionary Socialist League, which rapidly disintegrated.

In 1940, Shachtman left with a large part of the membership to form the Workers Party, with Shachtman and Burnham arguing that the Stalinists constituted a new bureaucratic class in the Soviet Union while Cannon, like Trotsky, felt that the Soviet Union should be defended despite Stalin's dictatorship and the invasion of Finland. This dispute is recorded in Cannon's book The Struggle for the Proletarian Party and in Trotsky's In Defense of Marxism. Nonetheless, Stalinists sought to punish both Cannon and Trotsky for their political opposition to the Stalinist-controlled Third International. Trotsky was assassinated in Mexico by an agent of the NKVD Foreign Department and the CPUSA supported the US government's prosecution of Cannon and other American Trotskyists under the Smith Act. Following the German invasion of the Soviet Union, the Soviet-controlled CPUSA started to support US entry into the war. This gave the CPUSA a common interest with the US government, preparing to go to war, whereas Cannon's SWP was continuing to mobilize the working class against the war. Even after his conviction on the charge of conspiring to overthrow the government and resultant eighteen months’ imprisonment during 1944 and 1945, Cannon's influence on the SWP was strong and he wrote to party leaders regularly; for example, recommending changing the party line on the Warsaw Uprising. Cannon's book 'Letters from Prison' contains many of these missives.

Following the war, Cannon resumed leadership of the SWP, but this role declined after he handed the post of national secretary in 1953 to Farrell Dobbs. Cannon retired to California in the mid-1950s. However, he remained an active member of the party's Political Committee. Cannon was very much involved in the splits which developed in both the SWP and the FI in 1952. He took a leading role in guiding the public faction supported by the SWP, the International Committee of the Fourth International; and supported the eventual reunification of the two sides in 1963, which led to the formation of the United Secretariat of the Fourth International. He took no part in the various tendency disputes that developed between 1963 and 1967, except to decry firmer organizational norms developed by his erstwhile supporters. These letters are collected in Don't Strangle The Party.

== Personal life ==
=== Marriage ===
He was married first to Lista Makimson. They had two children, Karl and Ruth. Lista died of a heart attack in 1929. His second wife was Rose Greenberg Karsner Cannon (1890–1969). She was originally from Romania, and came to the United States while still a child. She joined the Socialist Party in 1908, and married the journalist David Karsner in 1911. They had a child, Walta Karsner, but were divorced in 1921. She moved left politically and joined the Communist Party in 1920. She met James Cannon in 1921, and their relationship began that year. She was involved in James Cannon's formation of the Communist League of America and later, the Socialist Workers Party. She served as business manager of The Militant. She moved with James Cannon to California in 1953, and died in 1969.

=== Death and legacy ===
James P. Cannon died on August 21, 1974, aged 84. His papers are housed at the Wisconsin Historical Society in Madison and are available on microfilm through interlibrary loan.

== Works ==
A great deal of Cannon's writing has been collected, although volumes were issued non-sequentially by various publishers and are by no means exhaustive. In approximate chronological order of content, providing the publisher and date of first edition, his selected works include:

- The fifth year of the Russian revolution: a report of a lecture. New York: Workers Party of America, 1923.
- Trade unions in America. (with James P. Cannon and Earl Browder) Chicago: Published for the Trade Union Educational League by the Daily Worker, 1925. (Little red library #1)
- To the memory of the old man (Trotsky Obituary). New York: Pioneer Publishers for the Socialist Workers Party, 1940.
- Socialism on Trial: The courtroom testimony of James P. Cannon. New York: Pioneer Publishers, 1942. Official court record from the Minneapolis "sedition" trial.
- Defense Policy in the Minneapolis Trial. New York: Pioneer Publishers, 1942. Co-authored with Grandizo Munis. Reprinted in 1969 as What Policy for Revolutionists – Marxism or Ultra-Leftism?.
- The workers and the Second World War: speech to the tenth National Convention of the Socialist Workers Party, Oct. 2-4, 1942: with the political resolution adopted by the Convention. New York: Pioneer Publishers, 1942.
- The struggle for a proletarian party. New York: Pioneer Publishers, 1943.
- The End of the Comintern. New York: Pioneer Publishers, 1943.
- The Russian revolution. New York: Pioneer Publishers, 1944.
- Why we are in prison: farewell speeches of the 18 SWP and 544-CIO Minneapolis prisoners. New York: Pioneer Publishers, 1944.
- The History of American Trotskyism: Report of a Participant. New York: Pioneer Publishers, 1944. Pathfinder Press published a 4th edition in 2002.
- American Stalinism and anti-Stalinism. New York: Pioneer Publishers, 1947.
- The Coming American Revolution. New York: Pioneer Publishers, 1946.
- The Voice of socialism: radio speeches by the Socialist Workers Party candidates in the 1948 election. New York: Pioneer Publishers, 1948.
- The Road to Peace: According to Stalin and According to Lenin. New York: Pioneer Publishers, 1951.
- America's road to socialism. New York: Pioneer Publishers, 1953.
- The I.W.W.: on the fiftieth anniversary of the founding convention. New York: Pioneer Publishers, 1955. (Pioneer pocket library #4)
- The Debs centennial: written on the 100th anniversary of the birth of Eugene V. Debs. New York: Pioneer Publishers, 1956. (Pioneer pocket library #5)
- Notebook of an Agitator. New York: Pioneer Publishers, 1958.
- Socialist election policy in 1958. New York: Pioneer Publishers, 1958.
- Socialism and democracy. New York: Pioneer Publishers, 1959.
- The First Ten Years of American Communism: Report of a Participant. New York: Lyle Stuart, 1962.
- Letters from prison. New York: Merit Publishers, 1968.
- Peace politics vs revolutionary politics: Henry Wallace and the 1948 presidential campaign : report and summary of Socialist Workers Party election policy of 1948. New York: Young Socialist Alliance, 1968.
- Leon Trotsky on labor party: stenographic report of discussion held in 1938 with leaders of the Socialist Workers Party (with others) New York: Bulletin Publications, 1968.
- Defending the revolutionary party and its perspectives; [documents and speeches of the 1952-53 factional struggle and split in the Socialist Workers Party]. New York: National Education Dept., Socialist Workers Party, 1968.
- Speeches for Socialism. New York: Pathfinder Press, 1971.
- Speeches to the Party: The Revolutionary Perspective and the Revolutionary Party. New York: Pathfinder Press, 1973.
- The fight against fascism in the USA: forty years of struggle described by participants New York: National Education Dept., Socialist Workers Party, 1976.
- What is American fascism?: Writings on Father Coughlin, Mayor Frank Hague, and Senator Joseph McCarthy New York: National Education Dept., Socialist Workers Party, 1976.
- Background to "The Struggle for a Proletarian Party" New York: National Education Dept., Socialist Workers Party, 1979.
- The Cannon Tradition: "Don't Strangle the Party!". New York: Fourth Internationalist Tendency; Detroit, MI: Socialist Unity, 1986.
- James P. Cannon and the Early Years of American Communism: Selected Writings and Speeches, 1920-1928. New York: Prometheus Research Library, 1992.
- Dog Days: James P. Cannon vs. Max Shachtman in the Communist League of America, 1931-1933. New York: Prometheus Research Library, 2002.

=== Collected writings and speeches ===
- The Left Opposition in the US, 1928-31. New York: Monad Press, 1981.
- The Communist League of America, 1932-34. New York: Monad Press, 1985.
- The Socialist Workers Party in World War II. New York: Pathfinder Press, 1975. — Writings from 1940 to 1943.
- The Struggle for Socialism in the "American Century". New York: Pathfinder Press, 1977. — Writings from 1945 to 1947.
