= Marxist–Leninist League =

Marxist–Leninist League is the name of more than one group:

- Marxist-Leninist League (Denmark)
- Marxist-Leninist League of Tigray
- Marxist–Leninist League of Colombia
