= Revolutionary Workers League (Oehlerite) =

- Abbreviation: RWL
- Founder: Hugo Oehler
- Founded: 1935
- Dissolved: 1946
- Split from: Workers Party of the United States
- Ideology: Trotskyism
- Political position: Far-left

The Revolutionary Workers League (RWL) was a radical left group in the United States, lasting from 1935 through 1946. It was led by Hugo Oehler and published The Fighting Worker newspaper.

== Organizational history ==
=== Origins ===
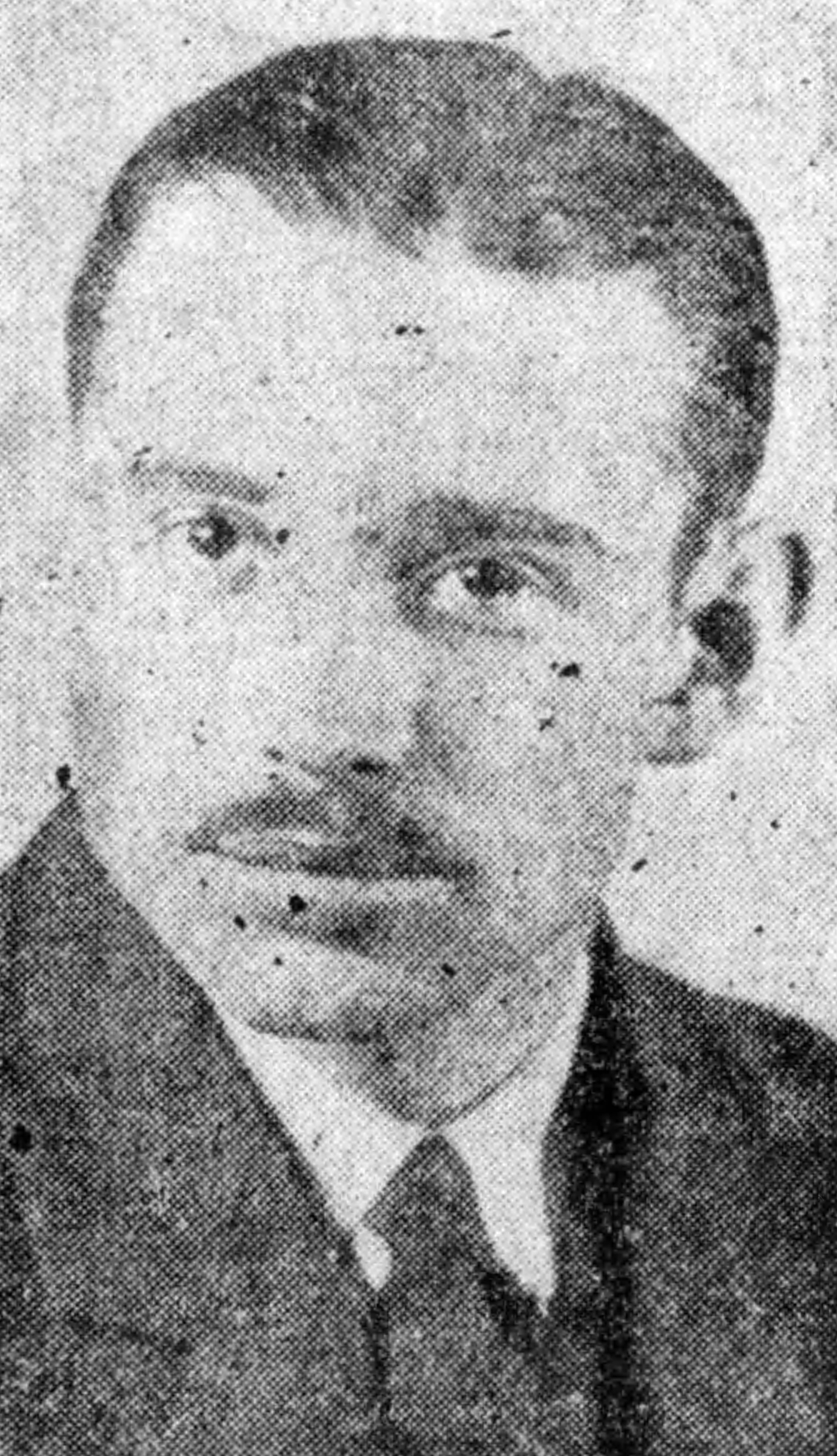
Hugo Oehler c. 1928

The RWL originated as a tendency within the Workers Party of the United States, which had been formed by the merger of the Trotskyist Communist League of America (CLA) and A. J. Muste's American Workers Party in December 1934. Some within the new party were advocating an application of Leon Trotsky's French Turn by having the enter in the Socialist Party of America. The issue was first raised at the "Active Workers Conference" at Pittsburgh in March 1935. Though the idea was favored by James Cannon and Max Shachtman, the two former leaders of the CLA, it was opposed by Joseph Zack Kornfeder and Muste.

The issue was again brought up at the WPUS June National Committee Plenum. Though the party issued a declaration denouncing "false rumors" of factionalism and moves toward merger with the socialists, a struggle did apparent take place, Muste, Oehler, and Martin Abern against joining the Socialist, with Cannon and Shachtman favoring the proposal. The group led by Oehler and Tom Stamm were not entirely opposed to work among the left wing members of the Socialist party, but wanted to bring them into the WP as a group, rather than have the Workers Party dissolve into the Socialist Party.

To that end they began negotiations with the Revolutionary Policy Committee. When they reported their talks to the party's Political Committee, they set up their own negotiating committee without any members of the Oehler-Stamm group on it. When Oehler-Stamm group continued their talks with RPC they were censured by the party's Control Commission. Things came to a head at the October 4–9, 1935 Plenum of the party's National Committee, at which the Oehler-Stamm group was forbidden to issue a factional periodical and were given a final warning to cease their violations of "organizational discipline". Oehler and his faction then withdrew to form the Revolutionary Workers League. By this time a majority of the National Committee come around to support the French turn.

The RWL originally thought of itself as an "opposition" within the official Trotskyist movement, in the same manner as Trotskyism originally conceived of itself as the "Left Opposition" within the Comintern. They focused, in their early years, to recruiting within the Trotskyist ranks, and may have created the "Marxist Policy Committee" within the Trotskyists' Socialist Appeal Association for that purpose.

=== Splits ===
The group went through a number of splits, both of organized factions and individuals. A small Marxist Workers League left early in 1936 and quickly rejoined the Trotskyists. Joseph Zack then renounced Marxism completely, and founded a new group called the One Big Union Club.

The majority of the group apparently renounced Trotskyism at its third Plenum in October–November 1938. However this caused a spit between Oehler, who believed that Trotsky had degenerated from Marxism in 1934, and Stamm who felt that Trotsky had degenerated in 1928. Others reasons given for the split included questions over democratic centralism as well as a supposed tendency to focus too much on European events, but Sidney Lens stated that Stamm's motivation was more personal: he simply did not wish to relocate from New York to Chicago, where the RWL's headquarters was being transferred to become closer to the heart of America industry. The Stammites set up another organization, also called the Revolutionary Workers League, sometimes called RWL (Revolt) after its periodical. They had small groups in New York, Philadelphia, Detroit, Chicago and elsewhere. After an attempted merger with the Fieldites and some Socialist Labor Party dissidents failed, the Stammites disbanded in 1941.

Other groups to split from the RWL included the Leninist League, led by George Marlen, a second Marxist Workers League led by Karl Mienov, a group headed by David Atkins that merged into the Bordigists, and the Revolutionary Communist Vanguard.

=== Trade union activities ===
The Revolutionary Workers League was active inside a number of trade unions, particularly the United Auto Workers. They succeeded in having one of their members Zygmunt "Ziggy" Dobrycinski elected as head of Local 205. However, when the RWL began to make demands for the "politicalization" of the members, including a six-hour day and workers management of the industry, "Ziggy" quit the RWL.

=== International ===
The group sent a man named Russel Blackwell (using the pseudonym Rosalio Negrete) to Spain during the early part of the Spanish Civil War, who made contacts to the Workers' Party of Marxist Unification (POUM) left wing. Later they sent Oehler, who was present during the May 1937 suppression of the anti-Stalinist Left. Oehler and Negrete were both imprisoned by the Loyalist regime, and only returned to the US after the intervention of the US embassy.

With the declaration of the Trotskyist Fourth International, the RWL instead founded the Provisional International Contact Commission for the New Communist (Fourth) International. Besides themselves, this included the Leninist League (UK) and the Revolutionary Communist Organisation (Austria), both groups close to Oehler.

=== Decline and dissolution ===
The outbreak of World War II led to a severe decline in the group. Its youth section, the Young Workers League appears to have been wound up in about 1940, the international disbanded in 1946, and The Fighting Worker ceased publication in 1947, although an attempt at a relaunch was made in 1950.

== Publications ==
The official organ of the Revolutionary Workers League was a newspaper called The Fighting Worker.

=== Serials ===
- The Fighting Worker New York; Chicago Vol. I #1 January 25, 1936 - Vol. XII #11 November 3, 1947 ("preliminary issue" November 30, 1935)
- International News New York eight issues August - November 1935
- Fourth International (Revolutionary Workers League New York; Chicago Vol. II #1 January 1936 - Vol. IV #5 February 1939
- Revolt New York Vol. I #1 March 26, 1938 to Vol II #14 January 7, 1940.
- Marxist: for the New Communist (Fourth) International. Theoretical Organ of the Revolutionary Workers League of the US New York; Chicago Vol. IV #2 November 1938 - Vol. V #7 October 1939
- International News; Organ of the Provisional International Contact Commission for the New Communist (Fourth) International Chicago Vol. I #1 September 1939 - Vol. XII #4 November 1950

=== Pamphlets ===
- Lenin and the Bolsheviki, New York, Revolutionary Workers League 1936.
- The Black Legion - union busters Chicago: Revolutionary Workers League of the U.S., 1936
- Boss elections or the workers vote: capitalist democracy or a workers government. New York, Revolutionary Workers League 1936.
- Stalinism Betrays the Spanish Revolution: Behind the Murder of Zinoviev, Kamenev, Smirnov and the Frame-up of Trotsky, New York, Chicago: Revolutionary Workers League of the US 1936.
- The Socialist Party moves to the right: analysis of the 1936 Cleveland Convention and the capitulation of the Trotskyists to the Socialist Party. Chicago: Revolutionary Workers League of the U.S., 1937
- The truth about the Moscow frame-up trials Chicago: Revolutionary Workers League of the U.S., 1937
- Sixth anniversary of the Spanish Republic in Barcelona: eyewitness account Chicago: Revolutionary Workers League of the U.S., 1937
- Barricades in Barcelona: the first revolt of the proletariat against the capitalist people's front, eyewitness account, Barcelona May 15, 1937 New York: Demos Press, 1937
- The workers' answer to boss war Chicago: Revolutionary Workers League of the U.S., 1937
- Fight fascism: defend revolutionists in Spain Chicago: Revolutionary Workers League of the U.S., 1938
- Fight against Roosevelt's war plans! Chicago, Ill: Demos Press, 1938
- Why communism? Chicago, Ill.: Revolutionary Workers League, US, 1938
- Lessons on Dialectic Materialism Chicago, Ill.: Revolutionary Workers League, US, 1938
- Capitalist decay and unemployment Chicago, Ill.: Revolutionary Workers League, US, 1938
- Workers rights or democracy: fight fascism by fighting capitalism. Chicago, Ill.: Revolutionary Workers League, US, 1938
- The negro under capitalism: resolution: adopted by the Fourth Plenum of the Central Committee of the Revolutionary Workers League of the United States, September 3-4, 1938, Chicago. N[ew] Y[ork] C[ity] Published for the Revolutionary Workers League by Demos Press 1938.
- Shall workers support a Labor Party? Chicago, Ill: Revolutionary Workers League, 1938
- Uncle Sam's stake in the war ... Chicago, Ill.: Revolutionary Workers League, US, 1939
- Minutes of the third national convention ... April 8–10, 1939. Chicago, Ill.: Revolutionary Workers League, US, 1939
- Negro slavery, then and now Chicago, Ill.: Revolutionary Workers League, US, 1939
- Draft program of the Revolutionary workers League of the United States Issued by the Political committee. Chicago, Ill.: Revolutionary Workers League, US, 1939
- The Stalin-Hitler Pact and the imperialist war. Chicago, Ill.: Revolutionary Workers League, US, 1939
- The lessons of Spain: the Peoples Front paves the way for Fascism. Chicago, Ill.: Revolutionary Workers League, US, 1939
- The social security measures; a Marxian analysis ... Chicago, Ill.: Revolutionary Workers League, US, 1939
- Where shall the Jewish masses turn? Chicago, Ill.: Revolutionary Workers League, US, 1939
- Trade Unionism Today, Chicago: Revolutionary Workers League 1940.
- The worker in the 1940 elections : vote against war and capitalism Chicago: Revolutionary Workers League 1940.
- "Soldiers get free graves," ... A UAW pamphlet ... by Jim Walden Chicago, Ill.: Revolutionary Workers League, US, 1940
- American imperialism: the main driving force for war. Chicago, Ill.: Revolutionary Workers League, US, 1940
- The history of the American labor movement Chicago, Ill.: Revolutionary Workers League, US, 1940
- Militarism under American imperialism Chicago, Ill.: Demos Press, 1941
- War, what for? Chicago, Ill.: Demos Press, 1941
- Dialectical materialism; a reply to Sidney Hook. Chicago, Ill.: Demos Press, 1941
- The Nazi invasion of the Soviet Union Chicago, Ill.: Revolutionary Workers League, US, 1941
- An Answer to the Renegades: Critique of Anti-Marxism, Chicago, Ill. : Revolutionary Workers League, U.S.A., 1941.
- The war and the left wing groups. Chicago : Demos Press, 1942
- Remember Odell Waller! Chicago, Ill.: Demos Press, 1942
- From Revolution to Reaction: A History of the 3rd International. Chicago, Ill.: Demos Press, 1942
- John Dewey, a Marxian critique by Sidney Lens (as Sid Okun) [Chicago] Revolutionary workers league, U.S. 1942.
- Minutes of the 13th Plenum Chicago, Illinois; Revolutionary Workers League 1942
- Workers' revolution, or wars forever Chicago, Ill.: Revolutionary Workers League of the U.S. 1945.
- Why the Revolutionary Workers League Chicago, Ill. : Revolutionary Workers League, U.S.A., 1945.
- If this be treason: an answer to the U.S. Attorney-General, Mr. Clark Cleveland, Ohio : Central Committee of the Revolutionary Workers League, U.S.A., 1949.

== See also ==
- Socialist Workers Party (United States)
