= Leninist League (US) =

The Leninist League was a communist political party in the United States. It published a newspaper called "In Defense of Bolshevism".

== History ==
The party's origins started in the Revolutionary Workers League of Hugo Oehler, which had originated in the Trotskyist movement, but rejected Trotskyism in 1937. A few members felt that it had not gone far enough, and, led by George Spiro (known as "Marlen", a portmanteau of Marx and Lenin), split in early 1938 to form the "Leninist League". The group was often referred to as the Marlenites after their leader's pseudonym.

Spiro aimed to destroy Trotskyism, calling Leon Trotsky an agent of Joseph Stalin and claiming that even the Revolutionary Workers League was "an enemy of the international working class. It is a sabotaging agency in the struggle of exposure and destruction of the Stalinist reaction."

While initially a tiny group, a small degree of press attention enabled the League to grow slightly. It published several books, and remained hostile to other left-wing currents. Its 1937 publication, In defense of Bolshevism; behind the betrayal in Spain, declared that it was "against the policy of 'correcting' Stalinist reaction, the counter-revolutionary social democracy, and also Lovestoneism and Trotskyism which are separated from Leninism by a narrow but very deep gulf!"

The League declared World War II to be a "phony" war, obscuring the real war of Western capitalists and Stalinist state capitalists against the proletariat.

In 1946, the League renamed itself the Workers League for a Revolutionary Party, and its publication as the Bulletin. It became critical of both Leninism and Marxism. Spiro began to focus his work on antisemitism among the left, and disagreement about its direction caused the group to dissolve itself in about 1950.

One person who was influenced by the Marlenites was a young Noam Chomsky, who was introduced to the group, partly as a result of the history professor Ellis Rivkin. He was impressed by their characterization of World War II as a "phony war" instigated by both by Western capitalists and the Soviet Union. He "never really believed the thesis, but... found it intriguing enough to try to figure out what they were talking about."

== Publications ==
- J C Hunter On the question of the workers state [U.S.? : Leninist League U.S.A., 1938
- After sixteen years of silence: (on Trotsky's article: "Did Stalin poison Lenin?"). New York: Leninist League, U.S.A., 1940
- Trotsky and the suppression of Lenin's testament. New York: Leninist League, U.S.A., 1940
- The case of Holland, Belgium and France. New York: Leninist League, U.S.A., 1940
- J C Hunter The murder of Trotsky and the fight against Stalinism. New York: Leninist League, U.S.A., 1940
- The split in the S.W.P. New York : The League, 1940
- Whither Shachtman New York : The League, 1940
- An explanation of the real meaning of Trotsky's article "Did Stalin poison Lenin?" New York: Leninist League, U.S.A., 1940
- Did Trotsky collaborate with Stalin: a reply to J.R. Johnson of the Workers Party " New York: Leninist League, U.S.A., 1940
- The Cannonites "answer" the Shachtmanites New York: Leninist League, U.S.A., 1940
- J. C. Hunter and G. Crane, Marx on a Sham War
- Pages from Trotsky's political history New York : Issued by the Bulletin, 1941
- The Trotsky school of falsification Vol. I New York City, The Bulletin 1942-1943
- The Trotsky school of falsification Vol. II New York City, The Bulletin 1942-1943
- Cannon's "Struggle for a proletarian party": an exposure of a political career New York: Leninist League, U.S.A., 1943
- Report and discussion on break with S.W.P. New York: Leninist League, U.S.A., 1947

=== Other works by George Spiro ===
- Paris on the barricades New York city, Workers Library Publishers 1929
- The road, a romance of the proletarian revolution New York, Red Star Press 1932
- Earl Browder, communist or tool of Wall Street; Stalin, Trotsky or Lenin New York, Printed at the Van Rees Press, 1937
- Marxism and the Bolshevik State; workers democratic world government versus national-burocratic 'Soviet' and capitalist regimes New York, Red Star Press 1951
- Marxist-Capitalist Threat to Destroy the Human Race-A CALL FOR SURVIVAL: On the Evolution, Scope and Forthcoming Termination of Male Hegemony in Society New York : New Star Press, 1965
- There are traitors to socialism in our midst. New York : G. Spiro, 1969
- Solzhenitsyn, the "communist" power : and the answer to the SALT delusion New York : G. Spiro, 1975
- The Formidable Marxist Swindle New York : G. Spiro, 1977
- The Jews of Israel in danger of extermination [New York?] : G. Spiro, 1979.
