= Hugo Oehler =

American communist and trade unionist

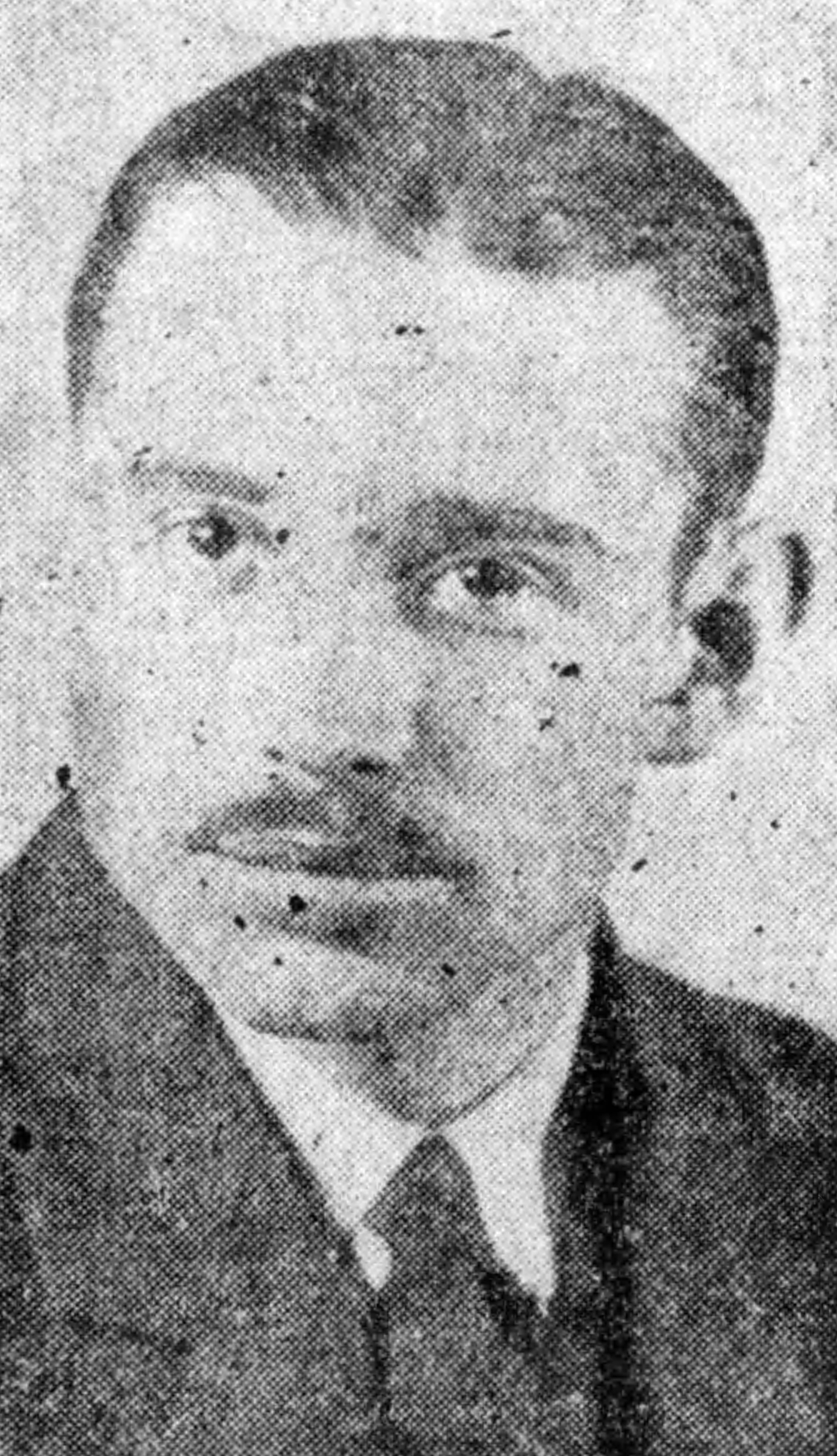
Oehler c. 1928

Edward Hugo Oehler (1903–1983) was an American Trotskyist.

== Biography ==
An active trade unionist, Oehler joined the Communist Party USA in its early days, and by 1927 was a district organizer for the party in Kansas. He was also known for his ability to organize workers, both in the southern textile mills and the mines of Colorado.

At the 7th National Convention of the Communist Party USA in 1930, Oehler controversially demanded that the Trotskyists be permitted to rejoin the party, abruptly ending his career with the official party. He then joined James P. Cannon, Max Shachtman and Martin Abern in the Communist League of America, the nation's first Trotskyist group. He was soon elected to the group's governing National Committee.

Oehler remained a prominent member of the League, serving on the committee of the International Labor Defense following the Loray Mill Strike. He organised unemployed workers during the Minneapolis Teamsters Strike of 1934.

In 1934, the Communist League merged with A. J. Muste's American Workers Party, becoming the Workers Party of the United States, and later entered the Socialist Party of America as part of Trotsky's "French Turn." Oehler objected to this entrism as a tactic, believing that it would lead to the group becoming influenced by reformism, although once the group had entered, he argued that it should not leave, as this would be unprincipled. As a result, he exited the Workers Party in November 1935 to form the Revolutionary Workers League (RWL) with Tom Stamm and Sidney Lens.

During the Spanish Civil War, the RWL supported only the Workers' Party of Marxist Unification (POUM). Oehler visited Spain to report for the RWL, where he was involved in the Barcelona May Days struggles, and wrote Barricades in Barcelona about his experiences. When he tried to leave the country, he was arrested on charges of spying and held without communication with the outside world for a month, before eventually being permitted to return home.

In 1937, Oehler broke with Leon Trotsky, concluding that Trotsky had split with Marxism in 1934. Stamm countered that Trotsky had degenerated in 1928, and the two split. In 1939, he severely criticised Trotsky's position for an independent Ukraine. In a polemic, he described his main differences with the Trotskyists as being "on revolutionary defeatism, on support for left-bourgeois governments, on support for third capitalist parties".

With the declaration of the Trotskyist Fourth International, Oehler concentrated on finding international contacts, which he grouped into the Provisional International Contact Commission for the New Communist (Fourth) International. However, World War II proved the start of a dramatic decline for the RWL, which appears to have been disbanded in the early 1950s, and Oehler faded into obscurity.

In the 1970s, Oehler lived in Denver, Colorado, and was interviewed there by Prometheus Research Library archivist Carl Lichtenstein.

== Works ==
- America's Role in Germany. Philadelphia: Communist League of America (Opposition), 1933.
- Dialectical Materialism: A Critique of Max Eastman [Chicago] Revolutionary Workers League, U.S. 1941
