= Hirzel (surname) =

Hirzel is a German-language surname. Notable people with the surname include:

- Conrad Melchior Hirzel (1793–1843), Swiss politician
- Peter Hirzel (1939–2017), Swiss cyclist
- Rudolf Hirzel (1846–1917), German classical scholar
- Salomon Hirzel (1727–1818), Swiss politician and historian
- Susanna Hirzel, known as Susette (1769–1858), Swiss painter
