= Jean van Heijenoort =

French-American mathematical historian

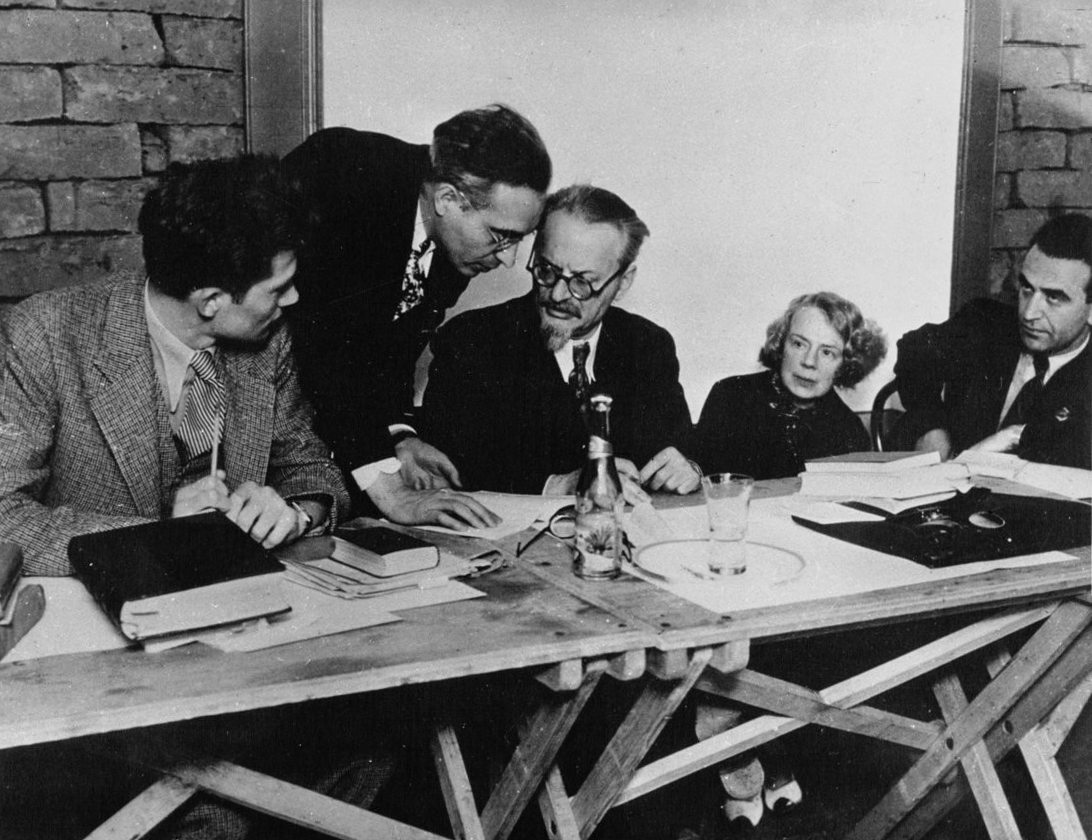
- Mexico 1937; left to right: Jean van Heijenoort, Albert Goldman, Leon Trotsky, Natalia Sedova, Jan Frankel
- Born: Jean Louis Maxime van Heijenoort; July 23, 1912; Creil, France
- Died: March 29, 1986 (aged 73); Mexico City, Mexico
- Education: New York University
- Employer(s): Columbia University; Brandeis University

Jean Louis Maxime van Heijenoort (/væn ˈhaɪ.ənɔːrt/ van HY-ə-nort; French: [ʒɑ̃ lwi maksim van‿ɛjɛnɔʁt]; Dutch: [ʒɑ̃ː ˈlu.is ˈmaksimə vɑn ˈɦɛiənoːrt]; July 23, 1912 – March 29, 1986) was a French-Dutch historian of mathematical logic. He was also a personal secretary to Leon Trotsky from 1932 to 1939, and an American Trotskyist until 1947.

== Life ==
=== Early life ===
Jean van Heijenoort was born in 1912 in Creil, Oise, France, as a son of a working class family. His birthday is 23 July. He had a Dutch father Jean Théodore Didier van Heijenoort (b. 1885), a Dutch man who moved to France and a French mother Charlotte Hélène Balagny (b. 1887). They got married in 1910. According to French nationality law, Balagny became Dutch. Her husband died in September 1914 during World War I. Van Heijenoort must suffer the hateful emotion by French Chauvinism against people with a German or Dutch name. Van Heijenoort always was called as sale Boche, "dirty German".

In 1949 the widow Balagny remarried; George Doré was her second husband. For this marriage, she restored her French nationality. A daughter Paulette was born. And Van Heijenoort spent several years with the mother's sister, also a widow, Angèle who had 2 daughters.

=== Communist activism ===
In 1932, Van Heijenoort was recruited by Yvan Craipeau to join the Trotskyist movement. He joined the Communist League in the same year. After Trotsky was exiled, he hired Van Heijenoort as a secretary and bodyguard, primarily because of his fluency in French, Russian, German, and English. Van Heijenoort spent seven years in Trotsky's household, during which he served as a translator, helped Trotsky write several books and carried on an extensive intellectual and political correspondence in several languages.

In 1939, Van Heijenoort moved to New York City to be with his second wife, Beatrice "Bunny" Guyer. He was not involved in the circumstances leading to Trotsky's murder in 1940. In New York, he worked for the Socialist Workers Party (US) (SWP) and wrote a number of articles for the American Trotskyist press and other radical outlets. He was elected to the secretariat of the Fourth International in 1940 but resigned when Felix Morrow and Albert Goldman, with whom he had sided, were expelled from the SWP. (Goldman subsequently joined the US Workers Party while Morrow did not join any other party or grouping.) In 1947, Van Heijenoort too was expelled from the SWP. In 1948, he published an article, entitled "A Century's Balance Sheet", in which he criticized that part of Marxism which saw the "proletariat" as the revolutionary class. He continued to hold other parts of Marxism as true.

Van Heijenoort was spared the ordeal of McCarthyism as everything he published in Trotskyist publications appeared under one of over a dozen pen names he used. According to Feferman (1993), Van Heijenoort the logician was quite reserved about his Trotskyist youth, and did not discuss politics. Nevertheless, he contributed to the Trotskyist movement until the last decade of his life, when he wrote his monograph With Trotsky in Exile (1978), and an edition of Trotsky's correspondence (1980). He advised and collaborated with the archivists at the Houghton Library in Harvard University, which holds many of Trotsky's papers from his years in exile.

=== Academic work ===
After completing a PhD in mathematics at New York University in 1949 under the supervision of J. J. Stoker, Van Heijenoort began to teach mathematics at New York University, but moved to logic and philosophy of mathematics, largely under the influence of Georg Kreisel. He started teaching philosophy, first part-time at Columbia University, then full-time at Brandeis University from 1965 to 1977. He spent much of his last decade at Stanford University, writing and editing eight books, including parts of the Collected Works of Kurt Gödel.

From Frege to Gödel: A Source Book in Mathematical Logic (1967) is an anthology of translations on the history of logic and the foundations of mathematics. It begins with the first complete translation of Frege's 1879 Begriffsschrift, followed by 45 short pieces on mathematical logic and axiomatic set theory, originally published between 1889 and 1931. The anthology ends with Gödel's landmark paper on the incompleteness of Peano arithmetic.

Nearly all the content of From Frege to Gödel: A Source Book in Mathematical Logic had only been available in a few North American university libraries (e.g., even the Library of Congress did not acquire a copy of the Begriffsschrift until 1964), and all but four pieces had to be translated from one of six continental European languages. When possible, the authors of the original texts reviewed the translations, and suggested corrections and amendments. Each piece was supplied with editorial footnotes and an introduction (mostly by Van Heijenoort but some by Willard Quine and Burton Dreben); its references were combined into a comprehensive bibliography, and misprints, inconsistencies, and errors were corrected.

From Frege to Gödel: A Source Book in Mathematical Logic contributed to advancing the view that modern logic begins with, and builds on, the Begriffsschrift. Grattan-Guinness (2000) argues that this perspective on the history of logic is mistaken, because Frege employed an idiosyncratic notation and was significantly less read than Peano. Ironically, Van Heijenoort (1967) is often cited by those who prefer the alternative model theoretic stance on logic and mathematics. Much of the history of that stance, whose leading lights include George Boole, Charles Sanders Peirce, Ernst Schröder, Leopold Löwenheim, Thoralf Skolem, Alfred Tarski, and Jaakko Hintikka, is covered in Brady (2000). From Frege to Gödel: A Source Book in Mathematical Logic underrated the algebraic logic of De Morgan, Boole, Peirce, and Schröder, but devoted more pages to Skolem than to anyone other than Frege, and included Löwenheim (1915), the founding paper on model theory.

Jean-Yves Girard's seminal paper on Linear logic is dedicated in memory of Jean van Heijenoort.

=== Death ===
Van Heijenoort was murdered by his fourth wife Anne-Marie. When Van Heijenoort tried to divorce, Anne threatened to commit suicide. "Of course, she wants to kill me too", he said to a friend. In March 1986, he returned to Mexico City from Stanford. He was shot three times and Anne shot herself thereafter.

== Personal life ==
Van Heijenoort had children with two of his four wives. While living with Trotsky in Coyoacán, Van Heijenoort's first wife left him after an argument with Trotsky's spouse.

Van Heijenoort was also one of Frida Kahlo's lovers; in the film Frida, he is played by Felipe Fulop.

== Selected works ==
- van Heijenoort, Jean (1967). "Logic as Language and Logic as Calculus". Synthese. 17 (3): 324–330. doi:10.1007/BF00485036. JSTOR 20114564. S2CID 46978612.
- van Heijenoort, Jean (1978). With Trotsky in Exile: From "Prinkipo" to "Coyoacán". Harvard University Press.
- van Heijenoort, Jean (1985). Selected Essays. Naples: Bibliopolis.

Books which Van Heijenoort edited alone or with others:

- van Heijenoort, Jean (2002) [1967]. From Frege to Gödel: A Source Book in Mathematical Logic, 1879–1931 (reprinted with corrections ed.). Harvard University Press. ISBN 9780674324497. OCLC 749638436.
- Gödel, Kurt (1986). Collected Works. Vol. I. Oxford University Press.
- Gödel, Kurt (1990). Collected Works. Vol. II. Oxford University Press.
- Herbrand, Jacques (1968). Ecrits Logiques (in French). Presses Universitaires de France.
- Trotsky, Leon; Trotsky, Natalia (1980). Correspondance 1933-38 (in French). Paris: Gallimard.

== Sources ==
- Anellis, Irving (1994). Van Heijenoort: Logic and Its History in the Work and Writings of Jean van Heijenoort. Modern Logic Publishing.
- Brady, Geraldine (2000). From Peirce to Skolem. North Holland.
- Feferman, Anita Burdman (1993). From Trotsky to Gödel: The Life of Jean Van Heijenoort. Wellesley MA: A.K. Peters. "With an Appendix by Solomon Feferman. The Fefermans knew Van Heijenoort professionally and socially for many years."
- Ferreirós, José (2004). "From Frege to Gödel: A Source Book in Mathematical Logic, 1879–1931". Historia Mathematica. 31 (1): 119–124. doi:10.1016/j.hm.2003.07.003.
- Grattan-Guinness, Ivor (2000). The Search for Mathematical Roots: 1870-1940. Princeton University Press.
