= Named set theory =

Branch of theoretical mathematics

Named set theory is a branch of theoretical mathematics that studies the structures of names. The named set is a theoretical concept that generalizes the structure of a name described by Frege. Its generalization bridges the descriptivists theory of a name, and its triad structure (name, sensation and reference), with mathematical structures that define mathematical names using triplets. It deploys the former to view the latter at a higher abstract level that unifies a name and its relationship to a mathematical structure as a constructed reference. This enables all names in science and technology to be treated as named sets or as systems of named sets.

Informally, named set theory is a generalization that studies collections of objects (may be, one object) connected to other objects (may be, to one object). The paradigmatic example of a named set is a collection of objects connected to its name. Mathematical examples of named sets are coordinate spaces (objects are points and coordinates are names of these points), vector fields on manifolds (objects are points of the manifold and vectors assigned to points are names of these points), binary relations between two sets (objects are elements of the first set and elements of the second set are names) and fiber bundles (objects form a topological space, names from another topological space and the connection is a continuous projection). The language of named set theory can be used in the definitions of all of these abstract objects.

== History ==
In the 20th century, many generalizations of sets were invented, e.g., fuzzy sets (Zadeh, 1965), or rediscovered, e.g., multisets (Knuth, 1997). As a result, these generalizations created a unification problem in the foundation of mathematics. The concept of a named set was created as a solution to this problem. Its generalization of mathematical structures allowed for the unification of all known generalizations of sets. Later it was demonstrated that all basic mathematical structures either are some kinds of named sets or are built of named sets. According to Anellis, Burgin & Kaloujnine introduced set-theoretical named sets in 1983 and Burgin introduced named sets in the most general form in 1990. Since then Burgin continued to develop this theory in a series of papers and a book. In 2011, Zellweger applied the theory of named sets to model data relations in the relational database for an end-user interface.

== Basic concepts ==
In mathematics, mathematical structures can have more than one definition. Therefore, there are several definitions of named sets, each representing a specific construction of named set theory. The informal definition is the most general.

=== Informal definition ===
A named set X has the form of a triad X = (X, f, I), in which X and I are two objects and f is a connection between X and I. It is represented by the fundamental triad in the following diagram.

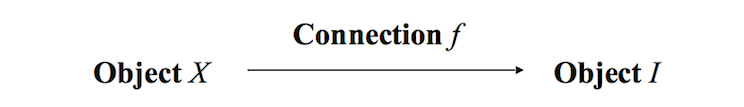

Elementary set theory can be studied informally and intuitively, and so can be taught in primary schools using set-theoretical named sets and operations with them.

=== Axiomatic definition ===
Similar to set theory, named sets have axiomatic representations, i.e., they are defined by systems of axioms and studied in axiomatic named set theory. Axiomatic definitions of named set theory show that in contrast to fuzzy sets and multisets, named set theory is completely independent of set theory or category theory while these theories are naturally conceived as sub-theories of named set theory.

=== Categorical definition ===
In a categorical definition, named sets are built inside a chosen (mathematical) category similar to the construction of set theory in a topos. Namely, given a category K, a named set in K is a triad X = (X, f, I), in which X and I are two objects from K and f is a morphism between X and I.

=== Set-theoretical definition ===
In a set-theoretical definition, named sets are built using sets similar to constructions of fuzzy sets or multisets. Namely, a set-theoretical named set is a triad X = (X, f, I), in which X and I are two sets and f is a set-theoretical correspondence (binary relation) between X and I. Note that not all named sets are set-theoretical. The most transparent example of non-set-theoretical named sets is given by algorithmic named sets, which have the form X = (X, A, I), in which X and I are two constructive objects, for example, sets of words, and A is an algorithm that transforms X into I.

=== Algorithmic definition ===
In an algorithmic definition, a named set A = (X, A, Y) consists of an algorithm A, the set X of inputs, and the set Y of outputs.

== Examples ==
=== Examples from everyday life ===
A name is given to a person, place, or thing to identify it. For example, parents can give their child a name or scientist can give an element a name. Examples of named sets include,

- People, their names and relations between people and their names.
- Countries, their names and relations between countries and their names.
- Articles in an encyclopedia, their titles (as names) and relations between articles and their titles (connection).

=== Examples from physics ===
- Any physical field, such as the electromagnetic field, is a named set.

=== Examples from mathematics ===
Henri Poincaré (1908) wrote that without a name no object exists in science or mathematics. Examples of such mathematical objects and their names as applications of named sets include,

- Binary relations are set-theoretical name sets. Already in 1960, Bourbaki represented and studied a binary relation between sets A and B in the form of a name set (A, G, B), where G is a graph of the binary relation, i.e., a set of pairs, for which the first projection is a subset of A and the second projection is a subset of B (Bourbaki, 1960).
- Functions are set-theoretical name sets as special cases of binary relations.
- A fuzzy set is a named set (U, m, [0,1]) where U is a set, [0,1] is a unit interval and m is a membership function.
- A graph G is a named set (V, E, V) where V is the set of vertices (nodes) of G and E is the set of edges of G.
- A fiber bundle B is a named set (E, p, B) where the topological space E is the space of B; the topological space B the base of B; and p is a topological projection of E onto B such that every point in B has a neighborhood U such that p^{−1}(b) = F for all points b from B and p^{−1}(U) is homeomorphic to the direct product U × F where F is the fiber of B.

Therefore, any set is actually a named set of the form (X, ∈, "X") where X is a set (without a name), "X" is the name of this set and connects elements from X to the name "X". That is why any description of set theory begins with a fundamental binary relation ∈. The next is basic binary relation ⊆ between two sets called the subset relation, or set inclusion. Some basic named sets of central importance are the empty named set (the unique set containing no objects, no names and the empty connection), the named set of natural numbers, in which numbers have names in natural languages and numerical systems (for example, the number ten has names: "10", "ten", "1010", "diez", "dix", "zehn", "X", and many others) and the set of real numbers, in which numbers are assigned point of a straight line as their names.

== Applications ==
All mathematical constructions are named sets or systems of named sets. For example, mathematical structures as diverse as graphs, manifolds, vector spaces, natural and real numbers are identified by formally defined terms that satisfy various (axiomatic) properties. Each name and its correspondence to a mathematical expression of its structure constitute a named set. Equivalence and order relations, which are ubiquitous in mathematics, are binary relations, which in turn, are formally defined terms that correspond mathematical structures, whereby representing a system of named sets.

All areas of science and technology have mathematics at its core. In general, there are explicit and implicit applications of named sets in these fields. For instance, any classification or nomenclature, such as the International Code of Botanical Nomenclature (2000), is an explicitly named set, where individual terms are well defined. Other examples of explicit applications of named sets are:

- The theory of fiber bundles in topology
- The theory of enumerations in computer science
- Mathematical models in epistemology and methodology of science

Examples of implicit applications of named sets include:

- Relational databases
- Tagging and labeling on the Internet, which has achieved wide popularity due to the growth of social networks, blogging, photography sharing and bookmarking sites
- Mathematical linguistics

In the case of relational databases, an application of named sets revealed an implicit uniform pattern of data relations hidden in the database called an Aleph. It is an abstract concept that generalizes the ubiquitous one-to-one and one-to-many data relations found throughout the database.

== See also ==
- Fuzzy concept
- Fuzzy mathematics
- Fuzzy set operations
- Rough set
- Multiset
- Category theory
- Set theory
- Relational model

== Bibliography ==
- Aigner, M. Combinatorial Theory, Springer Verlag, New York/Berlin, 1979
- Anellis, Irving H. (1991), "Editor's note: Burgin and the theory of named sets", Modern Logic. International Journal for the History of Mathematical Logic, Set Theory, and Foundations of Mathematics 2 (1): 1–2, ISSN 1047-5982, MR 1127352
- Bourbaki, N. Theorie des Ensembles, Hermann, Paris, 1960
- Burgin M. Theory of Named Sets as a Foundational Basis for Mathematics, In: Structures in Mathematical Theories, San Sebastian, 1990, pp. 417–420 (http://www.blogg.org/blog-30140-date-2005-10-26.html)
- Burgin, M. (1992) Algebraic Structures of Multicardinal Numbers, in Problems of group theory and homological algebra, Yaroslavl, pp. 3–20
- Burgin, M. (1995) Named Sets as a Basic Tool in Epistemology, Epistemologia, v. XVIII, pp. 87–110
- Burgin, M. (2001) "How We Know What Technology Can Do", Communications of the ACM, v. 44, No. 11, pp. 82–88
- Burgin, M. (2011), Theory of Named Sets, Mathematics Research Developments, Nova Science Pub Inc, ISBN 978-1-61122-788-8, https://books.google.com/books?id=1CpiewAACAAJ
- Burgin, M. and Zellweger, P. (2005) A Unified Approach to Data Representation, in Proceedings of the 2005 International Conference on Foundations of Computer Science, CSREA Press, Las Vegas, pp. 3–9*
- Church, A. Introduction to Mathematical Logic, Princeton University Press, Princeton, 1956
- Cunnigham, W. Objects, Patterns, Wiki and XP: All are systems of Names, OOPSLA 2004, Vancouver, Canada, 2004 (http://www.oopsla.org/2004/)
- Dalla Chiara, M. L. and Toraldo di Francia, G., ‘Individuals, kinds and names in physics’, in Corsi, G. et al. (eds.), Bridging the gap: philosophy, mathematics, physics, Kluwer Ac. Publ., 1993, pp. 261–283
- Irlam, G. Naming, 1995 (electronic edition: http://www.base.com/gordoni/web/naming.html)
- Knuth, D. The Art of Computer Programming, v.2: Seminumerical Algorithms, Addison-Wesley, Reading, Mass., 1997
- Martin, J. Computer Database Organization, Prentice-Hall, 1977
- Zadeh, L. (1965) Fuzzy Sets, Information and Control, v. 8, No. 3, pp. 338–353
- Zellweger, H. P. (2011) A Knowledge Visualization of Database Content Created by a Database Taxonomy, 15th International Conference on Information Visualization, pp. 323–328, 2011. ISBN 978-0-7695-4476-2
- Zellweger, Paul. (2016), The Aleph Data Relation in Structured Data, A Tree within a Tree Visualization. Visual and Data Analysis. San Francisco, CA, Feb. 14, 2016, p. 1-1(1), ISSN 2470-1173.
