= Begriffsschrift =

1879 book on logic by Gottlob Frege

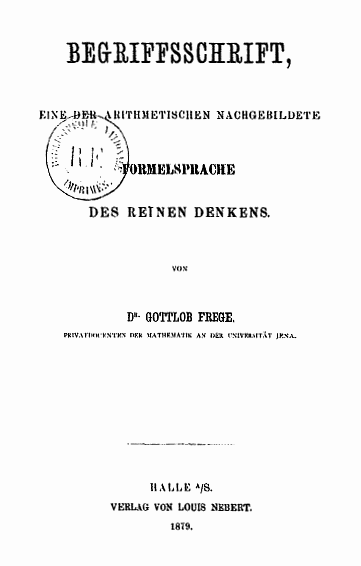
- The title page of the original 1879 edition
- Author: Gottlob Frege
- Language: German
- Subject: Logic
- Publisher: Lubrecht & Cramer
- Publication date: 1879
- Pages: 124
- ISBN: 978-3487-0062-39
- OCLC: 851287

Begriffsschrift (German for, roughly, 'concept-writing') is a book on logic by Gottlob Frege, published in 1879, and the formal system set out in that book.

Begriffsschrift is usually translated as concept writing or concept notation; the full title of the book identifies it as "a formula language, modeled on that of arithmetic, for pure thought." Frege's motivation for developing his formal approach to logic resembled Leibniz's motivation for his calculus ratiocinator. (Despite that, in the foreword Frege clearly denied that he achieved this aim, and also that his main aim would be constructing an ideal language like Leibniz's, which Frege declared to be a quite hard and idealistic—though not impossible—task.) Frege went on to employ his logical calculus in his research on the foundations of mathematics, carried out over the next quarter-century. This is the first work in analytic philosophy, a field that British and American philosophers later further developed.

== Notation and the system ==
The calculus contains the first appearance of quantified variables, and is essentially classical bivalent second-order logic with identity. It is bivalent in that sentences or formulas denote either True or False; second-order because it includes relation variables in addition to object variables and allows quantification over both. The modifier "with identity" specifies that the language includes the identity relation, =. Frege stated that his book was his version of a characteristica universalis, a Leibnizian concept that would be applied in mathematics.

In the first chapter, Frege defines basic ideas and notation: judgement, conditionality, negation, identity of content, (Note: The symbol $\equiv$ is used to indicate both material equivalence and identity proper.) functions and generality.

Frege presents his calculus in an idiosyncratic two-dimensional notation, based on negation, material conditional and universal quantification. Other connectives and existential quantification are provided as definitions. Parentheses are not needed.

The conditional ($B \to A$) is expressed by . Regarding its meaning Frege wrote:

"If A and B stand for contents that can become judgments, there are the following four possibilities:

1. A is affirmed and B is affirmed;
2. A is affirmed and B is denied;
3. A is denied and B is affirmed;
4. A is denied and B is denied.

Now

stands for the judgment that the third of those possibilities does not take place, but one of the three others does."

The building blocks are: (Note: A transcription from Begriffsschrift-notation to modern notation is given in Mendelsohn (2005, pp. 185–197, 198–201, Appendix A, Appendix B).)

Basic concept	Frege's notation	The diagram shows (in modern notation)	Modern notation
Judging	$\vdash A,\Vdash A$		$p(A)=1,$ $p(A)=i$ $\vdash A, \Vdash A$
Negation		basic	$\neg A$
Material conditional		basic	$B\to A$
Logical conjunction		$\lnot (B \to \lnot A)$	$A \land B$
Logical disjunction		$\lnot B \to A$	$A \lor B$
Universal quantification		basic	$\forall x\, F(x)$
Existential quantification		$\lnot \forall x\, \lnot F(x)$	$\exists x\, F(x)$
Material equivalence	$A\equiv B$		$A \leftrightarrow B$
Identity	$A\equiv B$		$A = B$

In hindsight, one can say that in Begriffsschrift, formulas are represented by their parse trees.

Example

Proposition 59 is written in modern notation as

$$\vdash g \left(b \right) \to \left(\lnot f \left(b\right) \to \lnot \left(\forall a\right)\left(g \left(a\right) \to f \left(a\right)\right)\right)$$.

The parse tree is

     →
    / \
g(b)   →
      / \
     ¬   ¬
     |   |
  f(b)   ∀a
         |
         →
        / \
    g(a)   f(a)

... in left-to-right horizontal layout

→ ─── → ─── ¬ ─── ∀a ─── → ─── f(a)
 \     \                  \
  g(b)  ¬                  g(a)
         \
          f(b)

In Begriffsschrift, proposition 59 is represented as

├─┬─┬─┬─a̲─┬─── f(a)
  │ │     └─── g(a)
  │ └──────┬── f(b)
  └─────────── g(b)

== The calculus in Frege's work ==
In the second chapter, Frege declared nine of his propositions to be axioms, and justified them by arguing informally that, given their intended meanings, they express self-evident truths. Re-expressed in contemporary notation, these axioms are:

1. $\vdash A \to (B \to A)$
2. $\vdash [ A \to (B \to C) ] \to [ (A \to B) \to (A \to C) ]$
3. $\vdash [ D \to (B \to A) ] \to [ B \to (D \to A) ]$
4. $\vdash (B \to A) \to (\lnot A \to \lnot B)$
5. $\vdash \lnot \lnot A \to A$
6. $\vdash A \to \lnot \lnot A$
7. $\vdash (c = d) \to (f(c) = f(d))$
8. $\vdash c = c$
9. $\vdash \forall a \, f(a) \to f(c)$

These are propositions 1, 2, 8, 28, 31, 41, 52, 54, and 58 in the Begriffschrifft. (1)–(3) govern material implication, (4)–(6) negation, (7) and (8) identity, and (9) the universal quantifier. (7) expresses Leibniz's indiscernibility of identicals, and (8) asserts that identity is a reflexive relation.

All other propositions are deduced from (1)–(9) by invoking any of the following inference rules:

- Modus ponens allows to infer $\vdash B$ from $\vdash A \to B$ and $\vdash A$;
- The rule of generalization allows to infer $\vdash P \to \forall x A(x)$ from $\vdash P \to A(x)$ if x does not occur in P;
- The rule of substitution, which Frege does not state explicitly. This rule is much harder to articulate precisely than the two preceding rules, and Frege invokes it in ways that are not obviously legitimate.

The main results of the third chapter, titled "Parts from a general series theory," concern what is now called the ancestral of a relation R. "a is an R-ancestor of b" is written "aR*b".

Frege applied the results from the Begriffsschrift, including those on the ancestral of a relation, in his later work The Foundations of Arithmetic. Thus, if we take xRy to be the relation y = x + 1, then 0R*y is the predicate "y is a natural number." (133) says that if x, y, and z are natural numbers, then one of the following must hold: x < y, x = y, or y < x. This is the so-called "law of trichotomy".

== Influence on other works ==
For a careful recent study of how the Begriffsschrift was reviewed in the German mathematical literature, see Vilko (1998). Some reviewers, especially Ernst Schröder, were on the whole favorable. All work in formal logic subsequent to the Begriffsschrift is indebted to it, because its second-order logic was the first formal logic capable of representing a fair bit of mathematics and natural language.

Some vestige of Frege's notation survives in the "turnstile" symbol $\vdash$ derived from his "Urteilsstrich" (judging/inferring stroke) │ and "Inhaltsstrich" (i.e. content stroke) ──. Frege used these symbols in the Begriffsschrift in the unified form ├─ for declaring that a proposition is true. In his later "Grundgesetze" he revises slightly his interpretation of the ├─ symbol.

In "Begriffsschrift" the "Definitionsdoppelstrich" (i.e. definition double stroke) │├─ indicates that a proposition is a definition. Furthermore, the negation sign $\neg$ can be read as a combination of the horizontal Inhaltsstrich with a vertical negation stroke. This negation symbol was reintroduced by Arend Heyting in 1930 to distinguish intuitionistic from classical negation. It also appears in Gerhard Gentzen's doctoral dissertation.

In the Tractatus Logico Philosophicus, Ludwig Wittgenstein pays homage to Frege by employing the term Begriffsschrift as a synonym for logical formalism.

Frege's 1892 essay, "On Sense and Reference," recants some of the conclusions of the Begriffsschrifft about identity (denoted in mathematics by the "=" sign). In particular, he rejects the "Begriffsschrift" view that the identity predicate expresses a relationship between names, in favor of the conclusion that it expresses a relationship between the objects that are denoted by those names.

== Editions ==
- Frege, Gottlob (1879). Begriffsschrift — eine der arithmetischen nachgebildete Formelsprache des reinen Denkens (pdf) (in German). Facsimile available for download (2.5 MB). Halle an der Saale: Lubrecht & Cramer. p. 124.

Also available from the Center for Retrospective Digitization.

Translations

- Frege, Gottlob (1967) [1879]. "Concept Script" (PDF). In Van Heijenoort, Jean (ed.). From Frege to Gödel: A Source Book in Mathematical Logic, 1879–1931. Translated by Bauer-Mengelberg, Stefan. Harvard University Press.
- Frege, Gottlob (2002) [1879]. Conceptual notation and related articles (pdf). Translated by Bynum, Terrell Ward. translated and edited, 1972; with a biography and introduction. Oxford University Press. pp. XII, 291. ISBN 978-0198243595.
- Frege, Gottlob (1997) [1879]. "Begriffsschrift: Selections (Preface and Part I)". The Frege Reader. Translated by Beaney, Michael. Oxford: Blackwell's.

== See also ==
- Ancestral relation
- Calculus of equivalent statements
- First-order logic
- Prior Analytics
- The Laws of Thought
- Principia Mathematica
- Concept horse paradox

== Bibliography ==
- Boolos, George (1985). "Reading the Begriffsschrift". Mind. 94 (375). Oxford University Press: 331–344. doi:10.1093/mind/XCIV.375.331. JSTOR 2254808.
- Grattan-Guinness, Ivor (2000). In Search of Mathematical Roots. Princeton University Press.
- Heyting, Arend (1930). "Die formalen Regeln der intuitionistischen Logik". Sitzungsberichte der preußischen Akademie der Wissenschaften, phys.-math. Klasse (in German): 42–56, 57–71, 158–169. OCLC 601568391.
- Korte, Tapio (22 October 2008). "Frege's Begriffsschrift as a lingua characteristica". Synthese. 174 (2): 283–294. doi:10.1007/s11229-008-9422-7. S2CID 20587814.
- Mendelsohn, Richard L. (2005). The Philosophy of Gottlob Frege. Cambridge University Press. ISBN 9780511109775.
- Toader, Iulian D. (2004). "On Frege's Logical Diagrams". In Blackwell, A.F.; Marriott, K.; Shimojima, A. (eds.). Diagrammatic Representation and Inference. Diagrams 2004. Third International Conference, Diagrams 2004, Cambridge, UK, March 22-24, 2004, Proceedings. Lecture Notes in Computer Science. Vol. 2980. Berlin, Heidelberg: Springer. doi:10.1007/978-3-540-25931-2_4.
- Vilkko, Risto (1998). "The reception of Frege's Begriffsschrift". Historia Mathematica. 25 (4): 412–422. doi:10.1006/hmat.1998.2213. Archived from the original on 20 July 2009.
