= Third Realm =

Third Realm may refer to

- Third Realm (Frege), a term used by Gottlob Frege for the world of abstract objects, as opposed to the external world and the world of internal consciousness
- An alternative translation of "Drittes Reich", a name for Nazi Germany that is usually translated as "Third Reich"
