= Socialist Appeal =

Socialist Appeal may refer to:

In the United Kingdom:

- Socialist Appeal, the journal of the Revolutionary Communist Party (UK, 1944), a British Trotskyist organisation that existed from 1944 to 1949
- Socialist Appeal (UK, 1992), British Trotskyist organization founded in 1992 and also the name of its newspaper, affiliated with the International Marxist Tendency, now known as the Revolutionary Communist Party.

In the United States:

- Socialist Appeal (US, 1935), a newspaper published from 1935 to 1941, first by the Trotskyist faction in the Socialist Party of America and later by the Socialist Workers Party.
