= Concept horse paradox =

Philosophical problem about Frege's distinction between concept and object

The concept "horse" paradox (also known as the concept horse problem or Frege's concept horse paradox; German: der Begriff Pferd) is a problem in the philosophy of language and philosophy of logic arising from Gottlob Frege's distinction between concept and object. It is named after Frege's remark in his 1892 essay "Über Begriff und Gegenstand" ("Concept and Object") that "the concept horse is not a concept".

Frege holds that predicates express concepts, whereas singular terms (including definite descriptions) stand for objects. The expression "the concept horse" is a grammatically singular term, so by Frege's own criterion it denotes an object rather than a concept, despite apparently purporting to pick out the concept of being a horse. The resulting tension has been seen as a challenge to Frege's sharp separation of concepts from objects and has prompted extensive discussion of predication, higher-order reference and type theory.

== Background ==
=== Concepts and objects in Frege ===
In Frege's mature work, concepts are treated as special kinds of functions from objects to truth-values. A complete declarative sentence is analysed as containing an expression naming an object together with a predicate that expresses a concept which the object either falls under or fails to fall under. Concepts, so understood, are unsaturated: they are incomplete and need to be combined with an argument to yield a truth-value, whereas objects are complete and can be referred to by names.

In Die Grundlagen der Arithmetik (The Foundations of Arithmetic) Frege stresses that the distinction between concept and object must not be blurred and builds his logicist account of number on it. His later writings add a hierarchy of types: first-level concepts apply to objects, second-level concepts apply to first-level concepts, and so on.

=== Linguistic criterion and definite descriptions ===
In "Concept and Object" Frege links this ontological distinction to a criterion derived from grammar. Predicate expressions such as "is a horse" are said to express concepts, while grammatically singular expressions—proper names and definite descriptions of the form "the F"—serve to designate objects. Because concepts are unsaturated, Frege denies that the same expression could function both as a name of an object and as a predicate expressing a concept.

This grammatical test has an important consequence: any expression introduced by the definite article, including "the concept horse", must on Frege's view be a singular term whose reference is an object. Frege maintains that ordinary language forces us to speak this way, even when our topic is itself a concept.

== Formulation of the paradox ==
The paradox is typically brought out by focusing on the sentence "the concept horse is not a concept". Frege claims that, strictly speaking, this sentence is true: because "the concept horse" is a singular term, it refers to an object, and predicates such as "is a concept" do not apply to objects. At the same time, Frege wants to uphold the thought that the concept of being a horse is indeed a concept, and that there are many such concepts.

Commentators have emphasised that three of Frege's commitments appear to clash:

1. Concepts and objects are disjoint categories; no concept is an object and no object is a concept.
2. Every referring expression is a singular term and refers to an object; concepts are never the referents of singular terms.
3. In mathematics and logic we routinely seem to talk about concepts, for example when we say "the concept prime number is instantiated infinitely often" or "there are infinitely many concepts under which every object falls".

Taken together, these assumptions suggest that either ordinary mathematical discourse is systematically misleading, or Frege's distinction between concepts and objects cannot be drawn in the way he envisaged. Ian Proops notes that different formulations of the problem correspond to different combinations of these theses, so that "the concept horse" paradox is best seen as a cluster of related difficulties rather than a single argument.

Frege himself describes the situation as a limitation of language rather than a flaw in his ontology. When we try to mention a concept, he suggests, we inevitably employ a singular term and thereby fail to keep the logical category of the entity mentioned in view; any fully perspicuous treatment would have to use his formal logical notation rather than ordinary German.

== Frege's diagnosis ==
Frege holds that in ordinary language a concept can only be properly expressed by a predicate: an incomplete expression that, when saturated by an argument, forms a sentence. Any attempt to refer to a concept by a name inevitably turns the concept into an object of a different sort. On this view, the only strictly correct way to talk about the concept of being a horse is to use the predicate "is a horse" within sentences; the phrase "the concept horse" is a convenient but logically misleading façon de parler.

Frege therefore distinguishes between:

- the concept expressed by the predicate "is a horse", which is a first-level function from objects to truth-values; and
- the object that is the reference of the singular term "the concept horse", which he takes to be some surrogate associated with that concept (for example, the value-range of the concept in the sense of his Basic Law V).

On this reading, Frege's sentence "the concept horse is not a concept" is, though misleading, strictly true: its subject-term refers to an object rather than to a concept. Many philosophers, however, have doubted that this is an acceptable way to talk about concepts, or that Frege's system can coherently sustain the distinction.

== Later discussion and proposed solutions ==
=== Objections to Frege's treatment ===
Terence Parsons argues that Frege need not have embraced the conclusion that "the concept horse is not a concept". By carefully distinguishing different levels of predication, Parsons contends that Frege could have allowed the subject-term in that sentence to refer to a concept while preserving his broader logical framework.

Crispin Wright criticises the attempt to tie logical category too closely to grammatical form through what he calls the "Reference Principle", according to which co-referential expressions must belong to the same grammatical category. Wright maintains that this principle is not well motivated and that Frege's appeal to it in explaining the concept horse paradox should be rejected.

Other authors, including Michael Dummett and Peter Geach, have questioned whether Frege's notion of an unsaturated concept can be reconciled with the apparent ability of predicates and other incomplete expressions to be treated as objects in both natural language and formal logic.

=== Type-theoretic and higher-order approaches ===
One family of responses modifies or supplements Frege's view by introducing a richer type theory. Higher-order Fregeans distinguish different grades of reference—reference to objects, to first-level concepts, to second-level concepts, and so on—and allow for different kinds of semantic relations corresponding to these types. Nick K. Jones, for example, proposes a higher-order semantics in which predicates have their own kind of reference and in which the problematic sentence can be analysed without collapsing concepts into objects.

Fraser MacBride develops an "impure reference" view, on which certain expressions combine features of singular terms and predicates. On this approach, terms that apparently name concepts can be accommodated without abandoning Frege's insight that concepts and objects play different logical roles.

Ansten Klev argues that Frege was mistaken to think that "the concept horse" must refer to an object at all. Appealing to Frege's own criteria for what counts as a proper name in his formal notation, Klev maintains that the grammatical subject of the sentence "the concept horse is a concept" can be seen as referring to a concept, provided that the predicate "is a concept" is not itself analysed as expressing a higher-level function.

=== Naming concepts and properties ===
A related line of debate concerns whether concepts and properties can be the referents of singular terms at all. Robert Trueman has argued that, within a Fregean framework, there is no coherent way to express identities between objects and properties and that attempts to do so are nonsensical. In response, Michael Price defends the possibility of singular reference to properties and contends that the concept "horse" may be named without contradiction.

Bob Hale and Crispin Wright likewise argue that predicates can, in an appropriate sense, be said to refer and that the concept horse paradox does not undermine the legitimacy of talking about concepts as entities.

=== Wittgensteinian and later analytic perspectives ===
Kelly Dean Jolley connects the concept horse paradox with Ludwig Wittgenstein's concerns about the limits of language and the distinction between what can be said and what can only be shown by logical syntax. On this reading, Frege's difficulties in talking about concepts foreshadow Wittgenstein's claim in the Tractatus Logico-Philosophicus that formal concepts cannot be named but are instead manifested in the form of propositions.

Other writers have used the paradox as a test case for theories of categories, predication and the semantics of higher-order expressions, including work in contemporary higher-order logic and categorical logic.

== Influence ==
The concept "horse" paradox has become a standard topic in studies of Frege and of the origins of analytic philosophy. Major discussions of Frege's philosophy of language and logic, including those by Dummett, Geach and others, typically devote attention to the paradox and to Frege's treatment of concepts, objects and value-ranges.

Beyond Frege scholarship, the paradox has shaped debates about the semantics of predicates, the viability of strict type-hierarchies, and the possibility of quantifying over and referring to properties and concepts in natural language and in formal systems.

== See also ==
- Gottlob Frege
- Concept and object
- Sense and reference
- Predication (philosophy)
- Higher-order logic
- Type theory
- Logicism
- Analytic philosophy
