= Eduard Riecke =

German physicist

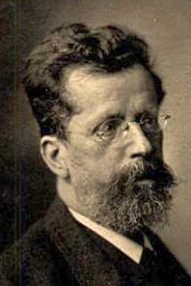
- Born: Karl Victor Eduard Riecke; 1 December 1845; Stuttgart, Kingdom of Württemberg
- Died: 11 June 1915 (aged 69); Göttingen, Prussia
- Education: Stuttgart Polytechnic, University of Tübingen, University of Göttingen
- Scientific career
- Fields: Experimental physics
- Notable students: Gottlob Frege; Johannes Stark

Karl Victor Eduard Riecke (1 December 1845 – 11 June 1915) was a German experimental physicist.

== Career ==
Riecke studied physics at the Stuttgart Polytechnic, at the University of Tübingen and at the University of Göttingen under Wilhelm Weber and Friedrich Kohlrausch, where he received his doctorate in 1871 and qualified as a professor shortly thereafter. In 1873 he became associate professor and in 1881 full professor, which he remained until his death.

He conducted experiments on electrical conduction in metals for which he further developed a model of management by electrons began by Paul Drude. With the model, among other things, the decrease in conductivity could be explained with increase in temperature. Later he worked among others with electricity conduction in gases.

The Bavarian Academy of Sciences appointed him in 1909 as a corresponding member. His students include Johannes Stark.

== Works ==
- Lehrbuch der Physik, 2 vols, Leipzig 1908

== See also ==
- Transmission electron microscopy
