= Function and Concept =

Work by Gottlob Frege

"Function and Concept" (German: "Funktion und Begriff") is a lecture delivered by Gottlob Frege in Jena at a meeting of the Jenaische Gesellschaft für Medicin und Naturwissenschaft on 9 January 1891, and published the same year as an article. The lecture involves a clarification of his earlier distinction between concepts and objects. It

The original article was reprinted in 1962.

== Overview ==
In general, a concept is a function whose value is always a truth value (139). A relation is a two place function whose value is always a truth value (146).

Frege draws an important distinction between concepts on the basis of their level. Frege tells us that a first-level concept is a one-place function that correlates objects with truth-values (147). First level concepts have the value of true or false depending on whether the object falls under the concept. So, the concept $F$ has the value the True with the argument the object named by 'Jamie' if and only if Jamie falls under the concept $F$ (or is in the extension of F).

Second order concepts correlate concepts and relations with truth values. So, if we take the relation of identity to be the argument $f$, the concept expressed by the sentence:

$\forall x \forall y f(x, y) \rightarrow \forall z (f (x, z) \rightarrow y=z)$

correlates the relation of identity with the True.

The conceptual range (Begriffsumfang in Frege 1891, p. 16) follows the truth value of the function:

$x^2 = 1$ and $(x + 1)^2 = 2(x + 1)$ have the same conceptual range.

== Translations ==
- "On Function and Concept" in Michael Beaney, ed., The Frege Reader, Blackwell, 1997, pp. 130–148
