= Albert Goldman (politician) =

American lawyer

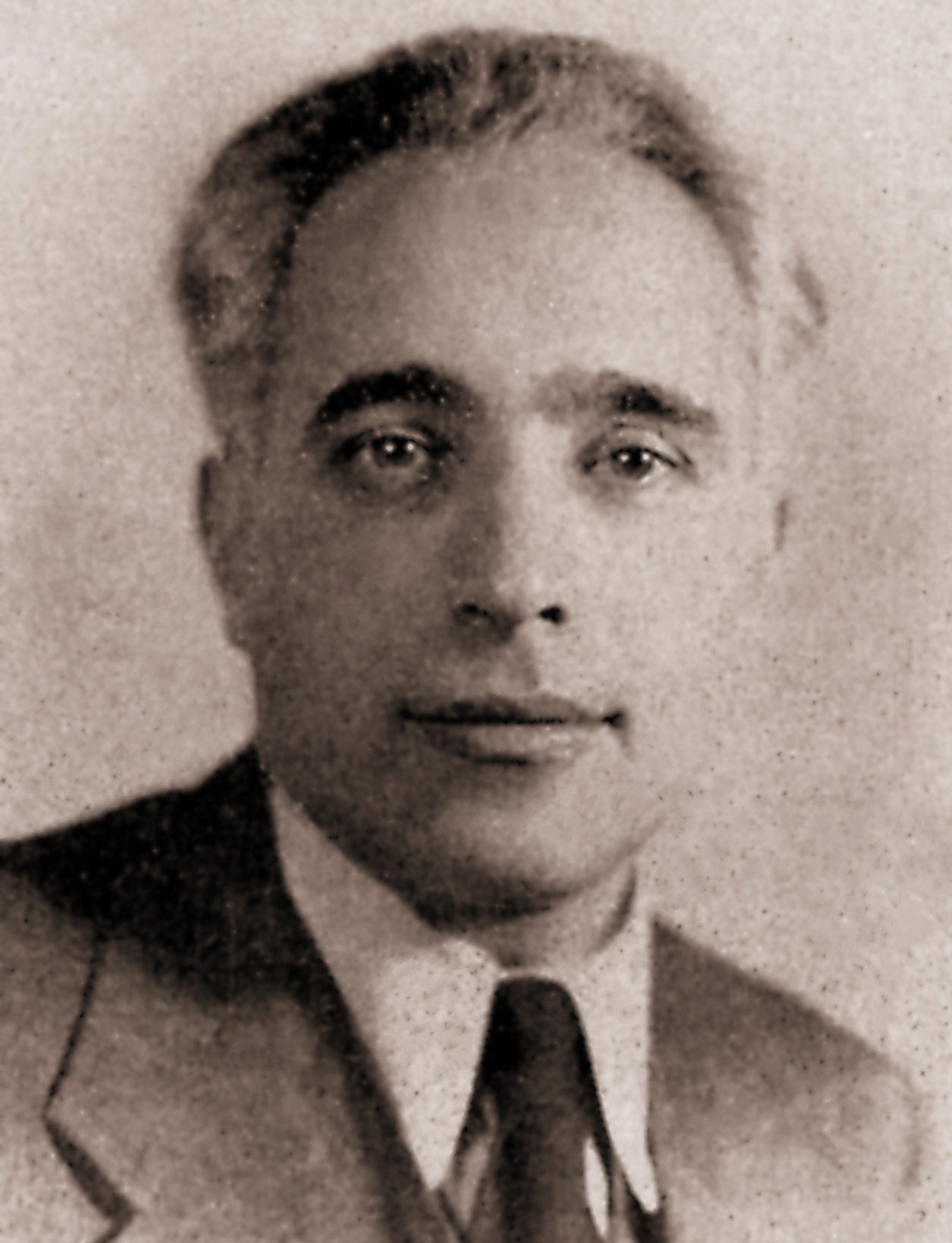
Goldman in 1942

Albert Goldman (1897–1960) was a Belarusian-born American political and civil rights lawyer, closely associated with the American communist movement. Goldman broke with the mainline Communist Party, USA in 1933, joining the Trotskyist opposition, in which he would be a leading participant for the better part of the next two decades. Goldman is best remembered as a defendant and lead defense attorney in the 1941 Smith Act prosecution of the leadership of the Socialist Workers Party.

For opposing America's involvement in World War II, Goldman was sentenced to 16 months in prison.

== Background ==
Albert Goldman was born of Jewish parents in 1897 in the Minsk Governorate of today's Belarus, then part of the Russian Empire. The family emigrated to the United States in 1904, when Albert was 7, settling in the Midwestern metropolis of Chicago.

Goldman attended elementary and secondary school in Chicago before leaving for Cincinnati to study to become a rabbi at Hebrew Union College. Goldman left before completing his rabbinical studies and transferred to the University of Cincinnati, where he captained the collegiate basketball team and ran track.

Following his graduation from college in 1919, Goldman worked as a tailor. He came into contact with the radical movement in this occupation, first joining the Industrial Workers of the World and shortly thereafter the newly formed Communist Party of America. Goldman made use of the pseudonym "Albert Verblin," under which name he wrote a polemic pamphlet answering a 1921 book by Socialist Party leader Morris Hillquit entitled From Marx to Lenin.

Goldman went on to study at the Northwestern University Law School, from which he graduated in 1925.

== Career ==
=== CPUSA ===
Following his admission to the Illinois State Bar, Goldman opened a legal practice in Chicago and began several years of close association with International Labor Defense (ILD), the legal defense organization of the Communist Party. On behalf of the ILD, Goldman participated in a series of cases defending political radicals and trade union activists who had run afoul of the law.

In 1931 Goldman made a trip to the Soviet Union, an experience which he found disillusioning. Goldman's intellectual unease grew and he became connected with the Trotskyist opposition movement, leading to Goldman's expulsion from the Communist Party, USA in 1933.

=== Trotskyism ===
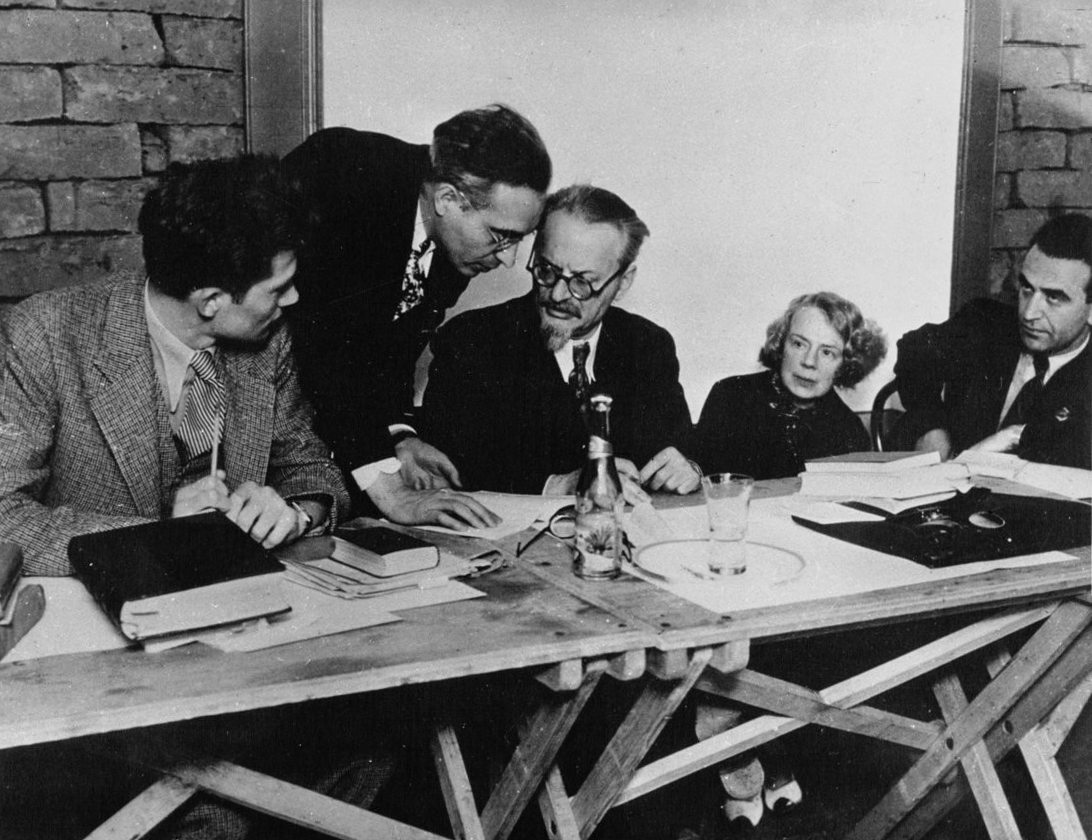
Mexico 1937; left to right: Jean van Heijenoort, Goldman, Leon Trotsky, Natalia Sedova, Jan Frankel

After his expulsion from the CPUSA, Goldman joined the Communist League of America (CLA), the small Trotskyist opposition party headed by James P. Cannon and Max Shachtman. He worked as an attorney on behalf of the Trotskyist movement, representing the CLA-led Minneapolis Teamsters strikers in 1934.

Goldman was an early advocate of dissolution of the party and entrance into the Socialist Party of America (SPA) in an effort to unite the anti-Stalinist left and to radicalize that organization. He was unable to win support for this position, however, so he severed his connection with the Trotskyists to himself join the SPA. In 1935 he established a mimeographed periodical called The Socialist Appeal as part of his effort to radicalize the Socialist Party.

It was not long before Goldman's idea of entry into the social democratic movement in an effort to unite and radicalize it had won currency in the international Trotskyist movement in accordance with the so-called "French Turn". The Trotskyists and their organizational allies associated with A. J. Muste, who had worked together in a new organization called the American Workers Party, dissolved their organization and entered the Socialist Party en masse.

Goldman became the attorney for Leon Trotsky, in exile in Mexico City, and defended him there in April 1937 against the charges leveled against him by the regime of Joseph Stalin in hearings conducted before a commission headed by liberal educator John Dewey. Goldman also served as an intermediary for Trotsky in the transfer of his personal and political archive to the library at Harvard University.

Goldman's Socialist Appeal became the semi-official organ of the organized Trotskyist faction inside the SPA up until their expulsion late in 1937 and their establishment of a new organization called the Socialist Workers Party (SWP) in 1938.

=== Smith Act trial ===
In 1941, Goldman was a defendant as well as chief defense counsel in the Minneapolis trial of top Socialist Workers Party leaders accused of violating the Smith Act—a prosecution pushed owing to the SWP's continuing opposition to American participation in World War II. The defendants in this case were convicted and served prison terms ranging from 12 to 16 months. Goldman received a 16-month sentence.

While in prison, Goldman worked with Felix Morrow to develop criticisms of the SWP and Fourth International leaderships. They claimed that predictions of a revolutionary wave after World War II had been proved incorrect, and that Stalinism, far from being destroyed (as Trotsky had predicted) had been strengthened. They also became critical of the party's organizational structures. The pair were only able to convince a small minority of the party of their positions, although this included key figures including Jean Van Heijenoort and James T. Farrell.

Following his release from prison in 1943, Goldman found himself disbarred from legal practice. He was forced to establish a car-rental business as a means of paying the bills while he worked for readmission to the Illinois bar. He would not be successfully reinstated to the bar until 1956, only a few years before his death.

=== Postwar ===
Following his release from prison, Goldman returned to his role among the leaders of the Socialist Workers Party. He gradually grew disenchanted, however, until in 1946 he and a small group of followers bolted the Cannon-led SWP to join the rival Workers Party, headed by Max Shachtman from 1940.

Goldman ran for political office in 1947, entering the race to become Mayor of Chicago with the support of the Workers Party.

Within the Workers Party, Goldman worked closely with James T. Farrell. In 1948, the pair developed criticisms of its policies, claiming that the party should support the Marshall Plan and also the presidential campaign of Socialist Norman Thomas. The divergence of these views from the party majority proved to be the impetus for an exit from the Workers Party in 1949. Goldman became a nominal member of the Socialist Party following his exit from the Workers Party, but in practice the period of his active participation in radical politics came to a close following his quitting of Shachtman's organization.

== Death ==
Goldman developed health problems towards the end of the 1950s, leading to his death from cancer in 1960.

== Legacy ==
Goldman's papers reside at the Wisconsin Historical Society, located on the campus of the University of Wisconsin, Madison.

== Works ==
- The Struggle for Power: From a Proletarian Viewpoint. As Albert Verblin. New York: Workers' Educational League, n.d. [c. 1921].
- Charge: Rioting; Verdict: Not Guilty!: A Plea to a Jury by Albert Goldman, Attorney for the International Labor Defense. Chicago: International Labor Defense, Chicago District, n.d. [1932].
- From Communism to Socialism: A Lecture Delivered before the Sixth Congressional Branch Forum of the Socialist Party of Cook County, December 7, 1934. n.c. [Chicago?]: n.p., 1935.
- What is Socialism?: Three Lectures for Workers. New York: Pioneer Publishers, 1938.
- The Assassination of Leon Trotsky: The Proofs of Stalin's Guilt. New York: Pioneer Publishers, 1940.
- Why We Defend the Soviet Union. New York: Pioneer Publishers, 1940.
- The Truth About the Minneapolis Trial of the 28: Speech for the Defense. New York: Pioneer Publishers, 1942.
- In Defense of Socialism: The Official Court Record of Albert Goldman's Final Speech for the Defense in the Famous Minneapolis "Sedition" Trial. New York: Pioneer Publishers, 1942.
- The Question of Unity Between the Workers Party and the Socialist Workers Party. Long Island City: Workers Party, 1947.
