= Rudolf Lingens =

Fictional character created by the logician Gottlob Frege

Rudolph Lingens is a fictional character often used by contemporary analytic philosophers as a placeholder name in a hypothetical scenario which illustrates some feature of the indexicality of natural language. He was created by the logician Gottlob Frege in the course of one of the earliest systematic discussions of indexicals. A number of philosophers picking up on Frege's discussion of indexicals, notably John Perry, David Lewis, and Robert Stalnaker, have adopted Lingens to make their own points about indexicals.

== De se attitudes ==
Lingens first appeared in Frege's influential essay 'Thought' ('Der Gedanke', published in Beiträge zur Philosophie des deutschen Idealismus I (1918–19), pp. 58–77). Mr. Lingens appears in the company of Leo Peter. Both are concerned with Dr. Gustav Lauben's having been wounded, and are later joined by Herbert Garner who is possessed of the knowledge that Gustav Lauben was born on 13 September 1875. Frege's discussion is concerned with how proper names and indexicals like 'I' function and how they are connected with the sense (or mode of presentation) that, on his account, each speaker who uses them associates with them.

Rudolf Lingens makes a number of appearances in the subsequent literature on Frege and on indexicals. Notably, he occurs in an influential 1977 paper by John Perry ('Frege on Demonstratives'), in which Perry asks us to imagine Lingens as an amnesiac in Main Library at Stanford who comes to read a complete biography of himself. By reading the biography, Lingens comes to have a rich body of factual information about Rudolf Lingens, but he still fails to realize that (as we would put it) he himself is Lingens. Here we resort to natural language indexicals—he himself—to try to express what knowledge it is Lingens lacks; and our resort to such indexicals for expressing this knowledge seems to be ineliminable. Much of the philosophical literature on indexicality is concerned with trying to explicate the apparently "essentially indexical" character of the information Lingens lacks in Perry's imagined scenario.

Attitudes that essentially require indexical reference to oneself to express—such as the belief Lingens would express by saying 'I am Rudolf Lingens'—are often called de se attitudes.

Philosophers David Lewis and Robert Stalnaker pick up on Perry's discussion. Lingens reappears in David Lewis's 1979 paper on the topic ('Attitudes de dicto and de se') and also in a 1981 paper by Robert Stalnaker ('Indexical Belief'). In his paper, Stalnaker suggests that Lingens is the cousin of Bernard J. Ortcutt, a character originally created by W.V. Quine to illustrate the distinction between de dicto and de re attitude ascriptions.

== Sources ==
Standard philosophical references for de se that discuss Lingens' predicament:

- Gottlob Frege (1997 [1918–19]). Thought. In The Frege Reader, ed. by Michael Beaney. New York: Blackwell. pp. 325–345.
- John Perry (1977). Frege on demonstratives Philosophical Review 86. pp. 474–497
- David Lewis (1979). Attitudes de dicto and de se Philosophical Review 88. pp. 513–543
- David Kaplan (1989). Demonstratives. In Themes from Kaplan, ed. by Joseph Almog, John Perry & Howard Wettstein. New York: Oxford University Press. pp. 481–614.
