= Conrad Melchior Hirzel =

Swiss politician (1793–1843)

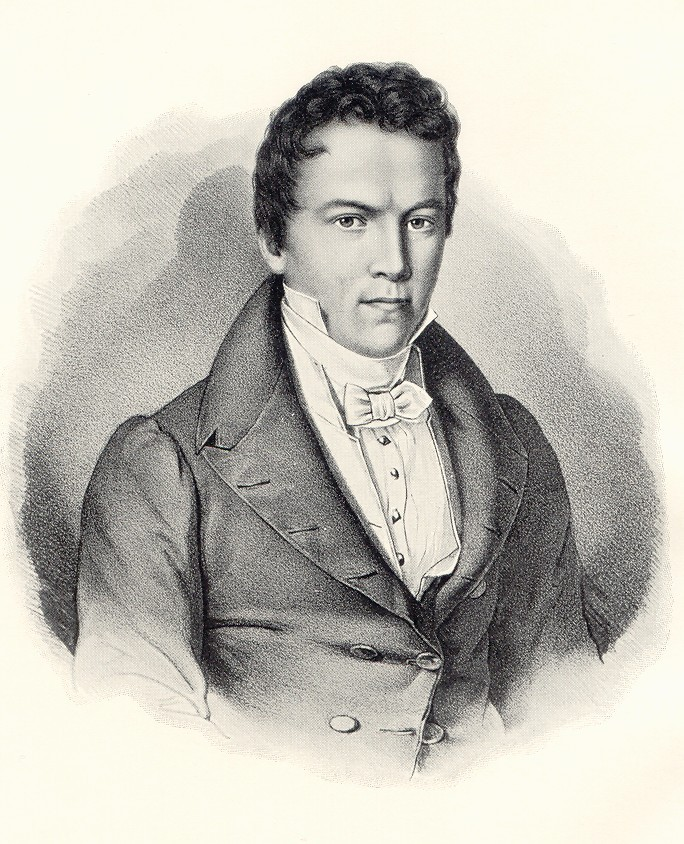
- Born: 31 August 1793; Zurich, Old Swiss Confederacy
- Died: 9 July 1843 (aged 49); Zurich, Switzerland
- Occupations: Lawyer; politician
- Spouse: Magdalena Henriette Sprüngli (m. 1820)
- Parents: Melchior Hirzel (father); Anna Bluntschli (mother)

Conrad Melchior Hirzel, also Konrad Melchior Hirzel (31 August 1793 – 9 July 1843), was a Swiss lawyer and politician from Zurich. He was a member of the cantonal government from 1831 to 1839 and mayor (Bürgermeister) of the canton from 1832 to 1839, and in 1834 he was president of the Federal Diet.

== Biography ==
Conrad Melchior Hirzel was born on 31 August 1793 in Zurich, the son of Melchior Hirzel, second public prosecutor at the supreme court of the Helvetic Republic, and Anna Bluntschli. In 1820 he married Magdalena Henriette Sprüngli, daughter of Hans Jakob Sprüngli, a merchant. In 1823 he received Greek citizenship in gratitude for his work for the Zurich Greek association (Griechenverein).

Hirzel studied law in Heidelberg and was admitted to the bar in 1815. In 1818 he became secretary of the Zurich government commission for justice and police and for notaries and advocates, and in 1823 district governor (Oberamtmann) of Knonau.

From 1825 to 1839 Hirzel was a member of the Grand Council of Zurich. From 1831 to 1839 he was a member of the cantonal government (Regierungsrat), and from 1832 to 1839 he was mayor (Bürgermeister) of the canton. From 1831 he worked on the commission for a federal constitution. In 1831 he was an envoy to the extraordinary Federal Diet, in 1832 he represented Zurich on the revision commission, and in 1834 he was president of the Diet (Tagsatzungspräsident). He died in Zurich on 9 July 1843. (Note: Sources disagree: the HDS gives 9 July 1843 as the date of his death, while the Allgemeine Deutsche Biographie and the authority file of the German National Library give 8 July 1843.)

== Bibliography ==
- Allgemeine Deutsche Biographie, 12, 494–497
- K. Müller, Bürgermeister Conrad Melchior Hirzel, 1793–1843, 1952
