= Rudolf Hirzel =

German classical scholar (1846–1917)

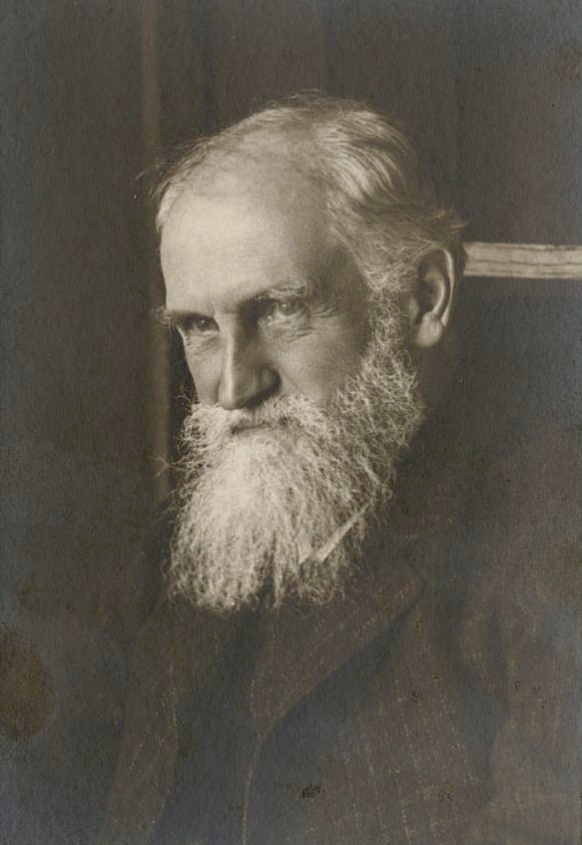
- Born: Rudolf Hirzel; 20 March 1846; Leipzig, Kingdom of Saxony, German Confederation
- Died: 30 December 1917 (aged 71); Jena, Saxe-Weimar-Eisenach, German Empire

Academic background
- Education: Humboldt University of Berlin
- Thesis: De bonis in fine Philebi enumeratis (1868)

Rudolf Hirzel (20 March 1846, Leipzig - 30 December 1917, Jena) was a German classical scholar, and author of a number of major books on Greek law, oaths, dialogues and names. He was the second son of Solomon Hirzel, the owner of a publishing house in Leipzig. He was educated at the Thomasschule in Leipzig and went to study Classics in Heidelberg, Göttingen (with Hermann Sauppe) and, lastly, Berlin, where he graduated in 1868 (with Moriz Haupt).

Hirzel married Dorothea Hirzel, née Springer, on 14 March 1887. They had no children. In Jena Rudolf Hirzel lived in the same house as Gottlob Frege and it has been conjectured that his studies in ancient logic may have influenced him.

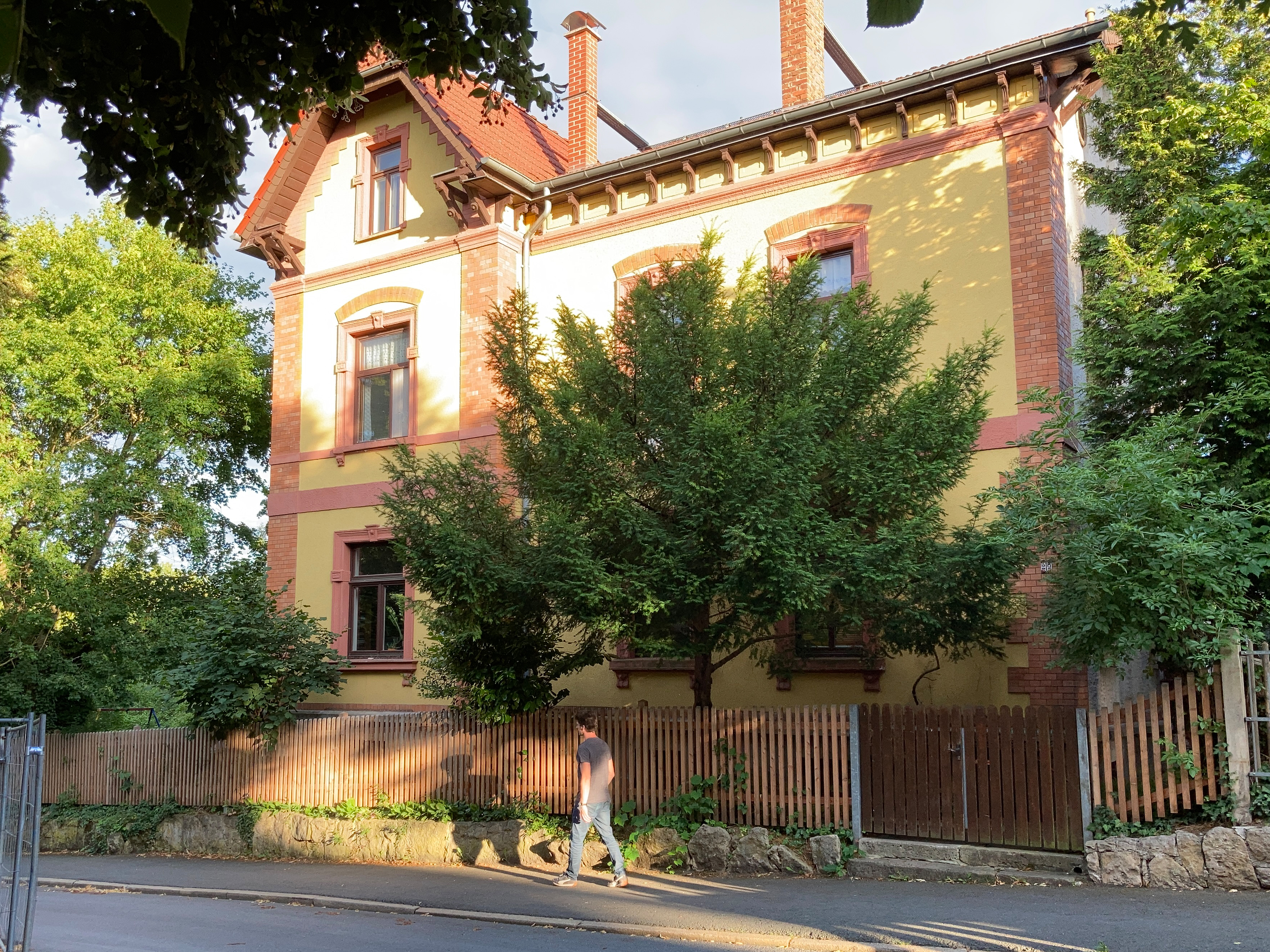
Hirzel's house at Forstweg 29 in Jena, shared with his neighbor Gottlob Frege

== Selected works ==
- Hirzel, Rudolf (1868). De bonis in fine Philebi enumeratis (in Latin). Leipzig: J. B. Hirschfeld.
- Hirzel, Rudolf (1877–1883). Untersuchungen zu Cicero's philosophischen Schriften (in German). Vol. 1–3. Leipzig: S. Hirzel. Vol. 1; vol. 2; vol. 3.
- Hirzel, Rudolf (1879). "De logica Stoicorum". Satura philologa. Hermanno Sauppio obtulit amicorum conlegarum decas (in Latin). Berlin: Apud Weidmannos. pp. 61–78.
- Hirzel, Rudolf (1895). Der Dialog. Ein literarhistorischer Versuch (in German). Vol. 1–2. Leipzig: S. Hirzel.
- Hirzel, Rudolf (1902). Der Eid. Ein Beitrag zu seiner Geschichte (in German). Leipzig: S. Hirzel.
- Hirzel, Rudolf (1907). Themis, Dike und Verwandtes. Ein Beitrag zur Geschichte der Rechtsidee bei den Griechen (in German). Leipzig: S. Hirzel.
- Hirzel, Rudolf (1909). "Die Strafe der Steinigung". Abhandlungen der Philologisch-Historischen Classe der Königlich Sächsischen Gesellschaft der Wissenschaften (in German). 27. Leipzig: B. G. Teubner: 223–266.
- Hirzel, Rudolf (1912). Plutarch. Das Erbe der Alten (in German). Vol. IV. Leipzig: Dieterich'sche Verlagsbuchhandlung.
- Hirzel, Rudolf (1914). Die Person. Begriff und Name derselben im Altertum. Sitzungsberichte der Königlich Bayerischen Akademie der Wissenschafte. Philosophisch-philologische und historische Klasse (in German). Vol. 10. Munich: Verlag der Königlich Bayerischen Akademie der Wissenschaften.
- Hirzel, Rudolf (1918). Der Name. Ein Beitrag zu seiner Geschichte im Altertum und besonders bei den Griechen (in German). Leipzig: B. G. Teubner.
