= Concept and object =

Philosophical distinction by Gottlob Frege

In the philosophy of language, the distinction between concept and object is attributable to the German philosopher Gottlob Frege in 1892 (in his paper "Concept and Object"; German: "Über Begriff und Gegenstand").

== Overview ==
According to Frege, any sentence that expresses a singular thought consists of an expression (a proper name or a general term plus the definite article) that signifies an object together with a predicate (the copula "is", plus a general term accompanied by the indefinite article or an adjective) that signifies a concept. Thus "Socrates is a philosopher" consists of "Socrates", which signifies the object Socrates, and "is a philosopher", which signifies the concept of being a philosopher.

The distinction was of fundamental importance to the development of logic and mathematics. Frege's distinction helped to clarify the notions of a set, of the membership relation between element and set, and of empty and infinite sets. However, Frege's conception of a class (in his terminology an extension of a concept) differs from the current iterative conception of a set.

Frege's distinction leads to the famous difficulty or "awkwardness of language" that some expressions which purport to signify a concept — Frege's example is "the concept horse" — are grammatically expressions that by his criterion signify an object. Thus "the concept horse is not a concept, whereas the city of Berlin is a city."

Anthony Kenny sought to justify the distinction, other philosophers such as Hartley Slater and Crispin Wright have argued that the distinguished category of entity cannot be associated with predication in the way that individual objects are associated with the use of singular terms.
