= Felix Morrow =

American political activist and newspaper editor

- Born: Felix Mayrowitz; June 3, 1906; New York City, U.S.
- Died: May 28, 1988 (aged 81); New York City, U.S.
- Other name: George Cooper
- Education: New York University, Columbia University
- Occupations: political activist, publisher
- Years active: 1933–1970s
- Organization(s): CPUSA, CLA, SWP, WP(US)
- Known for: communist/socialist/Trotskyist activism
- Notable work: Revolution and Counter Revolution in Spain (book, 1938) on the Spanish Civil War
- Movement: Trotskyism, Communism, Socialism
- Children: 4

Felix Morrow (né Mayrowitz; June 3, 1906 – May 28, 1988) was an American communist political activist and newspaper editor. In later years, Morrow left the world of politics to become a book publisher. He is best remembered as a factional leader of the American Trotskyist movement.

== Early life ==
Felix Morrow was born Felix Mayrowitz to an Orthodox Jewish family in 1906 in New York City. His parents, emigrants from Eastern Europe, ran a small grocery store in the city. Morrow later recalled his upbringing in a letter to historian Alan Wald:

I came from a Hassidic family, but my father at the age of 15 had fled in disillusionment from the house of the Chortkow Rebbe where his father was a gabbai (rabbai's assistant). But my mother remained religious and I had a traditional Jewish education.

In the U.S., both of Felix Mayrowitz's parents had become socialists and Felix had been a participant in the youth section of the Socialist Party of America from an early age, beginning with the Junior division of the Young People's Socialist League. At age 16, Felix was employed as a reporter by the Brooklyn Daily Times. He later went to work for the Brooklyn Daily Eagle, using his paychecks there to help finance his education at New York University (NYU).

Felix Mayrowitz graduated from NYU in 1928 and enrolled in graduate school at Columbia University, also located in New York City, where he studied religion in association with the Philosophy Department. At the time of his enrolling at Columbia, Felix availed himself of advice he had received that his professional progress would be easier with a less ethnic surname; it was at this time that Felix Mayrowitz became Felix Morrow. Friends at Columbia included Herbert Solow, Meyer Schapiro, Whittaker Chambers, George Novack, John McDonald, and Sidney Hook.

== Career ==
=== Communism ===
==== CPUSA ====
In 1931, the young graduate student applied for membership in the Communist Party USA in the wake of his friend Solow. At the time of his application, Morrow was advised by New York District Organizer Israel Amter that he would be of greater service to the party as a "secret" member of the organization rather than as a known public figure. Morrow was told by Amter to consider himself a party member, and his application was squirreled away in Amter's desk.

Morrow traveled the country extensively as a reporter for the Communist Party literary-artistic monthly, The New Masses and for its daily newspaper, The Daily Worker, making use of the pseudonym "George Cooper." His journalism was later collected into book form and translated into Russian for publication in the Soviet Union in 1933 as Life in the United States in this Depression. He also taught courses on American history at the CPUSA's New York party training school, served as a member of the party's speakers' bureau, and assisted Joseph Freeman with editorial tasks at The New Masses.

==== CLA ====
Morrow was for many years a leading figure in American Trotskyism, best known for his book Revolution and Counter-Revolution In Spain. He joined the Communist League of America in 1933. During this period, he described Malcolm Cowley as "the literary cop who patrols The New Republic beat for Stalin."

==== SWP, WP ====
The American Trotskyist movement underwent a complicated series of debates and splits in the 1930s: The CLA merged with the Workers Party of the United States in 1934, which then party dissolved into the Socialist Party of America in 1936. Shortly after, the Trotskyist faction of SPA (including Morrow) split to form the Socialist Workers Party (SWP).

From 1940, Morrow served as editor of the SWP's paper The Militant, and its theoretical journal "Fourth International." In 1945 he was displaced by E R Frank (Bert Cochran) on the maneuvers of James P. Cannon and the SWP majority who opposed his views on perspectives for European Trotskyists at the mid-war point.

Morrow was one of 18 SWP leaders, including the party's National Secretary, James P. Cannon, imprisoned under the Smith Act during the Second World War, receiving a 16-month sentence. (see Smith Act § Minneapolis 1941).

In 1943 he formed a faction, with Albert Goldman which challenged the SWP's "orthodox" catastrophic perspective. Morrow and Goldman projected the likelihood of a prolonged period of bourgeois democracy in western Europe and emphasised the need for democratic and transitional demands against the maximalism advocated by the majority. Although he was expelled from the SWP in 1946 for "unauthorised collaboration" with Shachtman's Workers Party, he did not join Shachtman, and drifted out of left-wing politics.

=== Publishing ===
In the early 1950s, with the help of friends Meyer Schapiro and Elliot Cohen, Morrow was hired by Schocken Books, working first as salesman and soon as a vice president there. He later worked at Beacon Press, a publisher based in Boston, Massachusetts.

In the late 1950s Morrow founded University Books, publishing hundreds of titles under that imprint, including a number of reprints.

Morrow wrote the foreword to the book Aleister Crowley: The Man, The Poet, The Mage by C. R. Cammell (New Hyde Park, N.Y.: University Books, 1962) using the pseudonym "John C. Wilson".

In the 1970s University Books was sold to the publisher Lyle Stuart, who continued to publish books under the imprint along with his own.

=== Death ===
Morrow died on May 28, 1988. He was survived by two daughters, a son, and two grandchildren. He lost another son to a car accident in 1969.

== Writings ==
Morrow's most important work was Revolution and Counter-Revolution in Spain on the Spanish Civil War.

- The Bonus March (New York, International Publishers, 1932) International pamphlets #31
- The Civil War in Spain: Towards Socialism or Fascism?. New York: Pioneer Publishers. 1936.
- Revolution and Counter-Revolution in Spain. New York: Pioneer Publishers. 1938.
- Labor's Answer to Conscription. New York: Pioneer Publishers. 1940.
- Felix Morrow Archive. Marxists Internet Archive.
