= Thought (essay) =

"Thought: A Logical Inquiry" is an essay by Gottlob Frege. It was published as "Der Gedanke. Eine logische Untersuchung" in the philosophy journal Beiträge zur Philosophie des deutschen Idealismus (English: Contributions to the philosophy of German idealism) in 1918. It was republished in Mind in English in 1956. In it, Frege argues against idealism and for platonism about thoughts, or propositions. Frege says ideas are private, but thoughts are public. Frege said that such abstract objects were members of a third realm. Frege also argued for a redundancy theory of truth.

Quoting Frege, "The thought, in itself immaterial, clothes itself in the material garment of a sentence and thereby becomes comprehensible to us. We say a sentence expresses a thought."
