= Irving Anellis =

American historian of philosophy

Irving H. Anellis (1946 to 2013) was a historian of philosophy.

Anellis began his study of philosophy in Boston, Massachusetts at Northeastern University, gaining his B.A. in 1969. He continued in Pittsburgh, Pennsylvania at Duquesne University, gaining the M.A. in 1971.

He studied with Jean van Heijenoort at Brandeis University and obtained the Ph.D. in 1977 with his thesis Ontological Commitment in Ideal Languages: Semantic Interpretations for Logical Positivism.

Anellis began his teaching career as a teaching assistant when at Northeastern. He taught at Mississippi Valley State University in 1980 and Mount Saint Clare College the next year. He was at University of Minnesota Duluth in 1982 and Des Moines Area Community College in the 1990s.

As a researching scholar he visited International Logic Review in Milan, Italy in 1982, and also the Bertrand Russell Editorial Project at McMaster University. In 1989 he joined the Institute for American Thought and became a research associate in the Peirce Edition Project in 2008.

In 1990 he began to edit Modern Logic, a journal on 19th and 20th century logic. Later the title was changed to The Review of Modern Logic.

Irving Henry Anellis died 15 July 2013.

== Works ==
- 1991: (with N. Houser) "Nineteenth Century Roots of Algebraic Logic and Universal Algebra"
- 1994: Jean van Heijenoort: Logic and its History in the Work and Writings of Jan van Heijenoort, Modern Logic Publishing
- 2005: Thirty-five biographical sketches in The Dictionary of Modern American Philosophers
- 2005: "Some views of Russell and Russell's logic by his Contemporaries, with particular reference to Peirce", Seminar at Peirce Edition Project
- 2011: "How Peircean was the 'Fregean' Revolution in Logic?"
- 2012 [2006]: Evaluating Bertrand Russell, the Logician and His Work, Docent Press ISBN 9780983700456
