= Socialist Appeal (newspaper) =

American political newspaper, 1935–1941

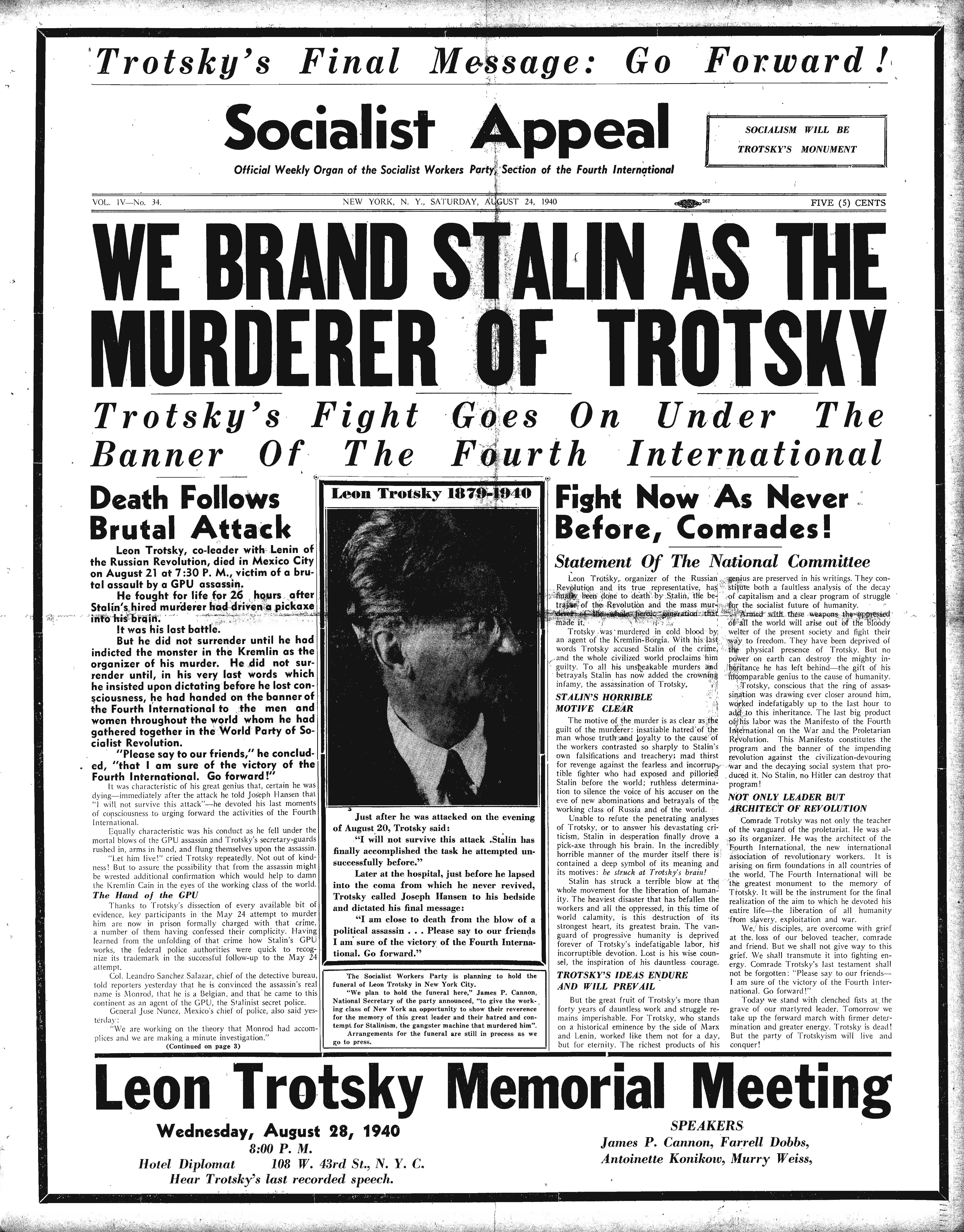
Socialist Appeal front page from August 24, 1940, discussing the assassination of Leon Trotsky.

Socialist Appeal was a newspaper published by American Trotskyists from 1935 to 1941. It was founded by supporters of the Trotskyist Workers Party of the United States in Chicago who had practiced entryism of the Socialist Party of America in 1935. It was edited by Albert Goldman. In 1936, the Workers Party formally dissolved and entered en masse into the SPA. In August 1937 the publication moved to New York City and was re-launched as the organ of the "Left Wing Branches of the Socialist Party" but was effectively controlled by the unofficial Trotskyist faction within the SPA. The "Socialist Appeal tendency" split from the Socialist Party to form the Socialist Workers Party in 1938. The publication became the official organ of the SWP and continued as Socialist Appeal until 1941, when it was retitled The Militant, reverting to the name of the original (1928–1934) Communist League of America publication.
