= John Reed Clubs =

Marxist organization for intellectuals

John Reed Club (JRC)
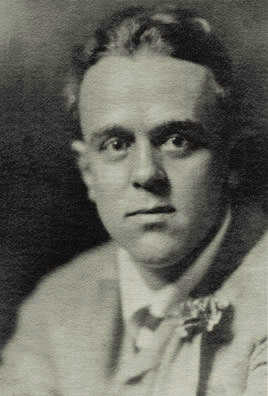
- John Reed c. 1917 namesake of the John Reed Club
- Successor: American Artists' Congress
- Formation: October 1929
- Dissolved: 1935
- Headquarters: 102 West 14th Street, NYC
- Official language: English
- Key people: Founders Mike Gold, Walt Carmon, William Gropper, Keene Wallis, Hugo Gellert, Morris Pass, Joseph Pass
- Main organ: Left Front, Partisan Review
- Parent organization: Workers Cultural Federation
- Subsidiaries: chapters in Boston, New York City, Newark, Philadelphia, Chapel Hill, Indianapolis, Chicago, Detroit, Milwaukee, Grand Rapids, Los Angeles (Hollywood), Carmel, San Francisco, Portland, Seattle

The John Reed Clubs (1929–1935), often referred to as the John Reed Club (JRC), were an American federation of local organizations targeted towards Marxist writers, artists, and intellectuals, named after the American journalist and activist John Reed. Established in the fall of 1929, the John Reed Clubs were a mass organization of the Communist Party USA which sought to expand its influence among radical and liberal intellectuals. The organization was terminated in 1935.

== History ==
=== 1929 ===
In October 1929, the John Reed Club was founded by eight staff members of the New Masses magazine to support leftist and Marxist artists and writers. They included: Mike Gold, Walt Carmon, William Gropper, Keene Wallis, Hugo Gellert, Morris Pass, and Joseph Pass.

According to Alan M. Wald, The John Reed Clubs were not founded by the Communist Party. New Masses managing editor Walt Carmon became frustrated with a group of young writers who were hanging out in the office and getting in his way. He told them to "go out and form a club" and "call it the John Reed Club." The John Reed Clubs would be a constant source of drama within the New Masses family, and members of the Clubs would eventually found the Partisan Review, which became a main competitor to the New Masses.

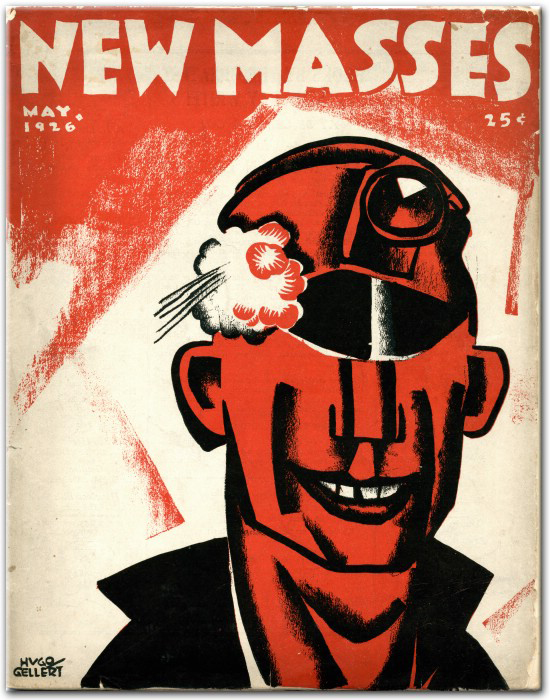
New Masses cover by Hugo Gellert (May 1926)

The New Masses announced the new club in its November 1929 issue:

The radical artists and writers of New York have organized the John Reed Club. The group includes all creative workers in art, literature, sculpture, music, theater, and the movies...
The purpose of the Club is to bring closer all creative workers; to maintain contact with the American revolutionary labor movement.
In cooperation with workers groups and cultural organizations, discussion, literary evenings, and exhibits will be organized. Hopefully, the organization will be national in scope...
For the first time, a group of socially conscious creative workers has been organized in America to compare with existing groups in Europe. Steps have been taken to make immediate contact with writers, artists, and all creative workers in France, Germany, Russia, and Japan.

=== 1930 ===
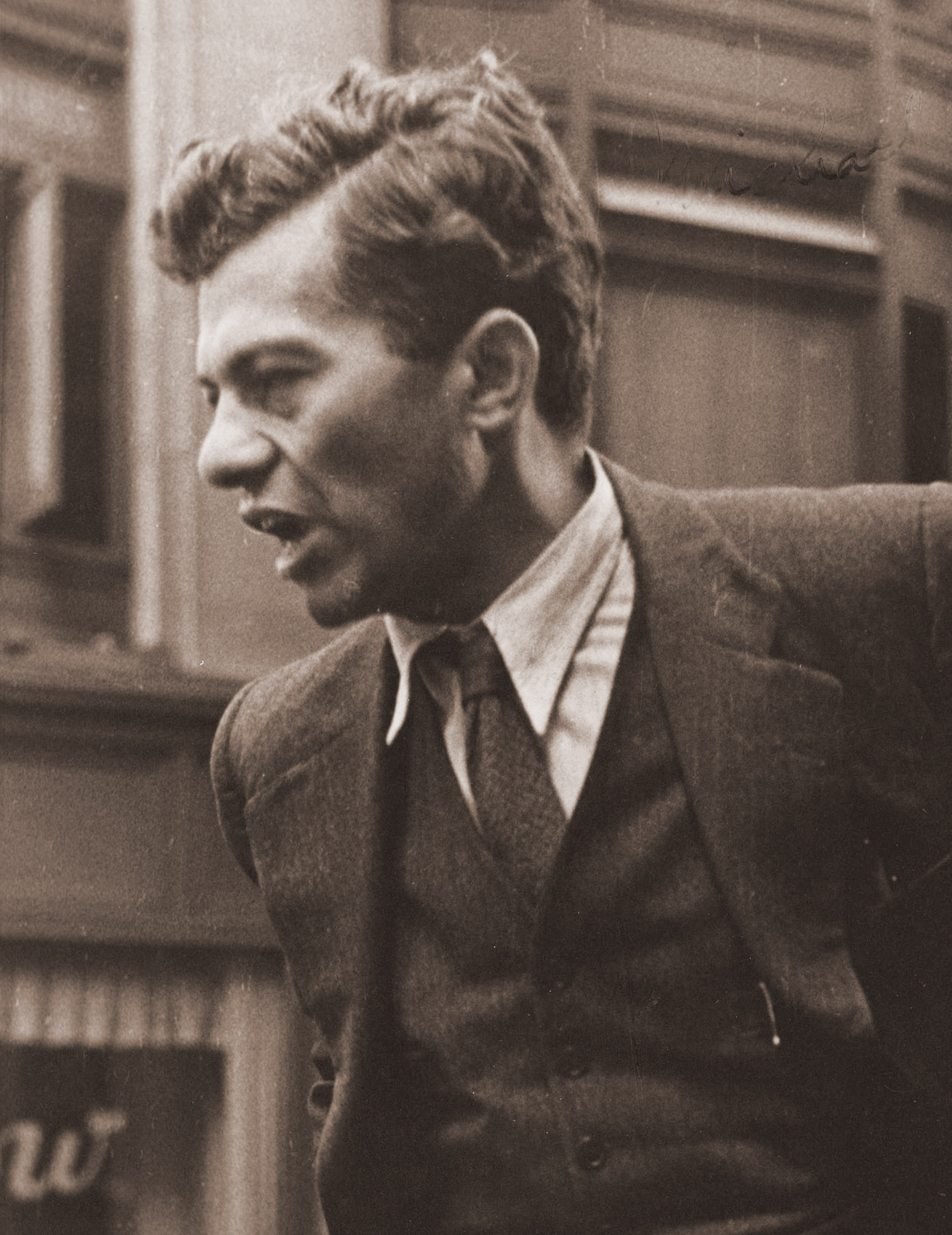
Mike Gold (here, 1930s before crowd in New York City) was a prominent JRC co-founder.

In January 1930, Mike Gold described the JRC in the New Masses as a "small group" comprising writers, artists, sculptors, musicians, and dancers "of revolutionary tendencies". They were already building a clubhouse. Harold Hickerson had a music school with 100 pupils. Gropper and Lozowick taught graphic arts to 30. Edith Siegel led a "worker's ballet" for a Lenin memorial. Em Jo Basshe directed a Jewish Workers' theatre. Others taught at the New York Workers School. They cooperated with Workers International Relief. Gold recommended that every writer-member work in industry. He cited as example Ed Falkowski (miner), Martin Russak (textile worker), H. H. Lewis (farmer), and Joe Kalar (lumberman).

On May 19, 1930, the New York Times published "A protest against the imprisonment of men and women for expressing their political opinions, coupled with a warning that "Red-baiting" is rapidly becoming a permanent condition, was voiced in a statement issued yesterday by the John Reed Club. The headlines of the article ran:

'RED SCARE' PROTEST ISSUED BY LIBERALS
100 Writers, Educators and Artists Warn of Dangers in 'Hysteria' and 'Persecution'
SEE CIVIL RIGHTS AT STAKE
Statement Says 1,600 Have Been Wrongfully Arrested In 2 Months-Aid of Press Asked

Signatories included:

- L. Adohmyan
- Sherwood Anderson
- Emjo Basshe
- Helen Black (Helen Marie Black)
- Franz Boas
- Alter Brody
- Samuel Brody
- Fritz Brosius
- Jacob Burck
- David Burliuk
- Rev. R. B. Callahan
- Walt Carmon
- Ralph Cheyney
- Nicolai Cikovsky
- Lydia Cinquegrana
- Sarah N. Cleghorn
- Ann Coles
- Malcolm Cowley
- Franz E. Daniel
- Miriam A. DeFord (Miriam Allen deFord)
- Adolf Dehn
- Floyd Dell
- L. A. De Santes
- Babette Deutsch
- Carl Van Doren
- John Dos Passos
- Robert W. Dunn
- Max Eastman
- Charles Ellis
- Fred Ellis
- Ernestine Evans
- Kenneth Fearing
- Sara Bard Field
- Waldo Frank
- Harry Freeman
- Al Frueh
- Hugo Gellert
- Michael Gold
- Floyd S. Gove
- C. Hartley Grattan
- Horace Gregory
- William Gropper
- Rose Gruening
- Carl Haessler
- E. Haldeman-Julius
- M. Haldeman-Julius
- Ruth Hale (feminist)
- Jack Hardy
- Minna Harkavy
- S. R. Harlow
- Charles Y. Harrison
- Aline D. Hays (Aline Davis Hays)
- Arthur G. Hays (Arthur Garfield Hays)
- Lowell B. Hazzard
- Josephine Herbst
- John Herrmann
- Harold Hickerson
- Grace Hutchins
- Eitaro Ishigaki
- Joseph Kaplan
- Ellen A. Kennan
- Rev. C. D. Ketcham
- Rev. Frank Kingdon
- I. Kittine
- I. Klein
- Alfred Kreymborg
- Joshua Kunitz
- Melvin P. Levy
- Louis Lozowick
- Grace Lumpkin
- Norman J.Macleod
- A. B. Magil
- Jan Matulka
- H. L. Mencken
- Norma Millay
- Harriet Monroe
- Frank McLean
- Scott Nearing
- Alfred H. Neumann
- Eugene Nigob
- Joseph North
- Harvey O'Connor
- M. J. Olgin
- Joseph Pass
- Morris Pass
- Nemo Piccoli
- Harry Alan Potamkin
- John Cowper Powys
- Juanita Preval
- Walter Quirt
- Burton Rascoe
- Anton Refregier
- Philip Reisman
- Louis Ribak
- Boardman Robinson
- Anna Rochester
- Anna Rosenberg
- Julius Rosenthal
- Martin Russak
- Samuel Russak
- David Saposs
- E. A. Schachner
- Theodore Scheel
- Isidor Schneider
- Evelyn Scott
- Edwin Seaver
- Edith Segal
- Esther Shemitz
- William Siegel
- Upton Sinclair
- John Sloan (John French Sloan)
- Otto Soglow
- A. Solataroff
- Walter Snow
- Raphael Soyer
- Herman Spector
- J. M. Stalnaker
- Genevieve Taggard
- Eunice Tietjens
- Carlo Tresca
- Jim Tully
- Louis Untermeyer
- Joseph Vogel
- Keene Wallis
- Frank Walts
- Prof. R. E. Waxwell
- Rev. C. C. Webber
- G. F. Willison
- Edmund Wilson Jr.
- Adolf Wolff
- Charles E. S. Wood
- Art Young
- Stark Young
- Avrahm Yarmolinsky
- William Zorach

In July 1930, Harry Alan Potemkin, JRC secretary, reported in the New Masses that the JRC had supported May Day as well as signed a petition for the International Labor Defense for prisoners of war. The club also collaborated with "Proletpen", a Jewish proletarian writing group. It also supported the "United Front Conference Against Lynching", created by the New York district of the Communist Party USA. Books published by member writers included: Charles Yale Harrison's Generals Die in Bed and Mike Gold's children's story Charlie Chaplin's Parde.

By November 1930, although originally politically independent, the JRC and the New Masses officially affiliated with the Communist Party. This turn coincided with the JRC's participation in the Kharkov Conference of the International Union of Revolutionary Writers (IURW), November 6–15, 1930. The joint JRC-New Masses delegation included: Mike Gold, A.B. Magil, Fred Ellis, William Gropper, Harry Potamkin, Josephine Herbst, and John Herrmann. The conference led to a ten-point "Program of Action" to promote proletarian literature as an important part of promoting Marxism.

=== 1932 ===
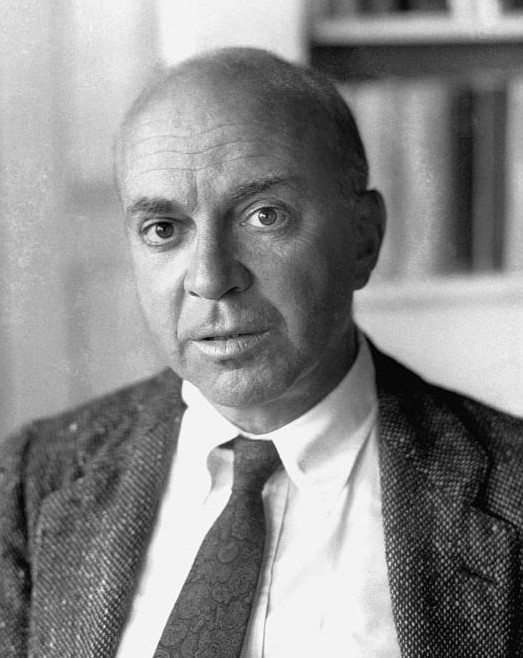
John Dos Passos was a prominent writer and JRC member.

On January 1, 1932, Diego Rivera spoke before the John Reed Club's New York chapter. Later, when the JRC heard of Rivera's support for Leon Trotsky, they disavowed him and returned a $100 contribution he made.

The JRCs held a national conference on May 29–30, 1932, in Chicago. During the conference, the JRCs announced they were "an integral part of the "Workers Cultural Federation".

Conference ("presidium") members elected included: Joseph Freeman, Jan Wittenber, Conrad Komorowski, Kenneth Rexroth, Charles Natterstad, Harry Carlisle, George Gay, Carl Carlsen, and Jack Walters. Honorary members included Maxim Gorki, Romain Rolland, John Dos Passos, Seikichi Fujimori, Lo Hsun, Johannes Becher, Vallant-Couturier, and Langston Hughes, with Maurice Sugar as chairman and Oakley C. Johnson as secretary.

Chapter reports consistently criticized the original New York City chapter of ignoring the others. Harry Carlisle of JRC Hollywood opposed Mike Gold of JRC NYC for falling down on principle when opening the JRC to non-Marxist writers and artists. Instead, Carlisle urged, the JRC should focus on "artists and writers of distinctly working class origin."

The July 1932 issue of the New Masses included the "John Reed Club Resolution Against War", stating its stance against "imminent imperial war", noting that the Soviet Union "stands for peace", and calling on all writers, artists, and professionals to unite "in defense of the first workers' republic, the Union of Soviet Socialist Republics."

In November 1932, JRC members who publicly endorsed the Communist Party's US presidential slate (William Z. Foster and James W. Ford) included: EmJo Basshe, Robert Cantwell, Orrick Johns, Grace Lumpkin, Langston Hughes, Mike Gold, and Louis Lozowick.

=== 1933 ===
In early 1933, the JRCs took a strong stance against Hitler and the rising tide of Fascism in Europe.

In mid-1933, the JRCs held a second national conference. Attendees include: Jack Conroy, Meridel Le Sueur, Alan Calmer, Orrick Johns, Joe Jones, Nelsen Algren, William Phillips, Philip Rahv, Alfred Hayes, Gilbert Rocke, Jan Wittenber, Mike Gold, Richard Wright, Alexander Trachtenberg, A.B. Magil, Jack S. Balch, Joseph North.

=== Dissolution ===
In 1936, the John Reed Clubs dissolved into the American Artists' Congress by order of the Communist Party USA.

== Organization ==
The John Reed Club's slogan was "Art is a weapon in the class struggle."

=== Headquarters ===
In May 1930, the headquarters for the John Reed Club was 102 West Fourteenth Street, New York City. In 1932, its location was 63 West Fifteenth Street, New York City.

=== Chapters ===
New York City and Los Angeles were the two centers of writer-members.

In 1931, there were 13 JRC chapters. Chapters peaked at thirty. From New York, it spread to Chicago, Detroit, San Francisco, Boston, and other cities. The Boston chapter was cofounded by writer Eugene Gordon.

=== John Reed Club School of Art ===
During the 1932 national convention, the JRCs announced the opening of a "John Reed Club School of Art" in New York City at 450 Sixth Avenue. Classes were to start on November 14, 1932, for Monday evenings and Saturday afternoons. Instruction was open beyond JRC members. Instructors included Hugo Gellert, William Gropper, Louis Lozowick, and William Siegel. One of the students was Norman Lewis, studying from 1933 to 1935.

== People ==
By 1933, the New York chapter had 380 members, of whom some 200 were artists and the rest writers. The only paid job was secretary-treasurer at $15 per week.

=== Officers ===
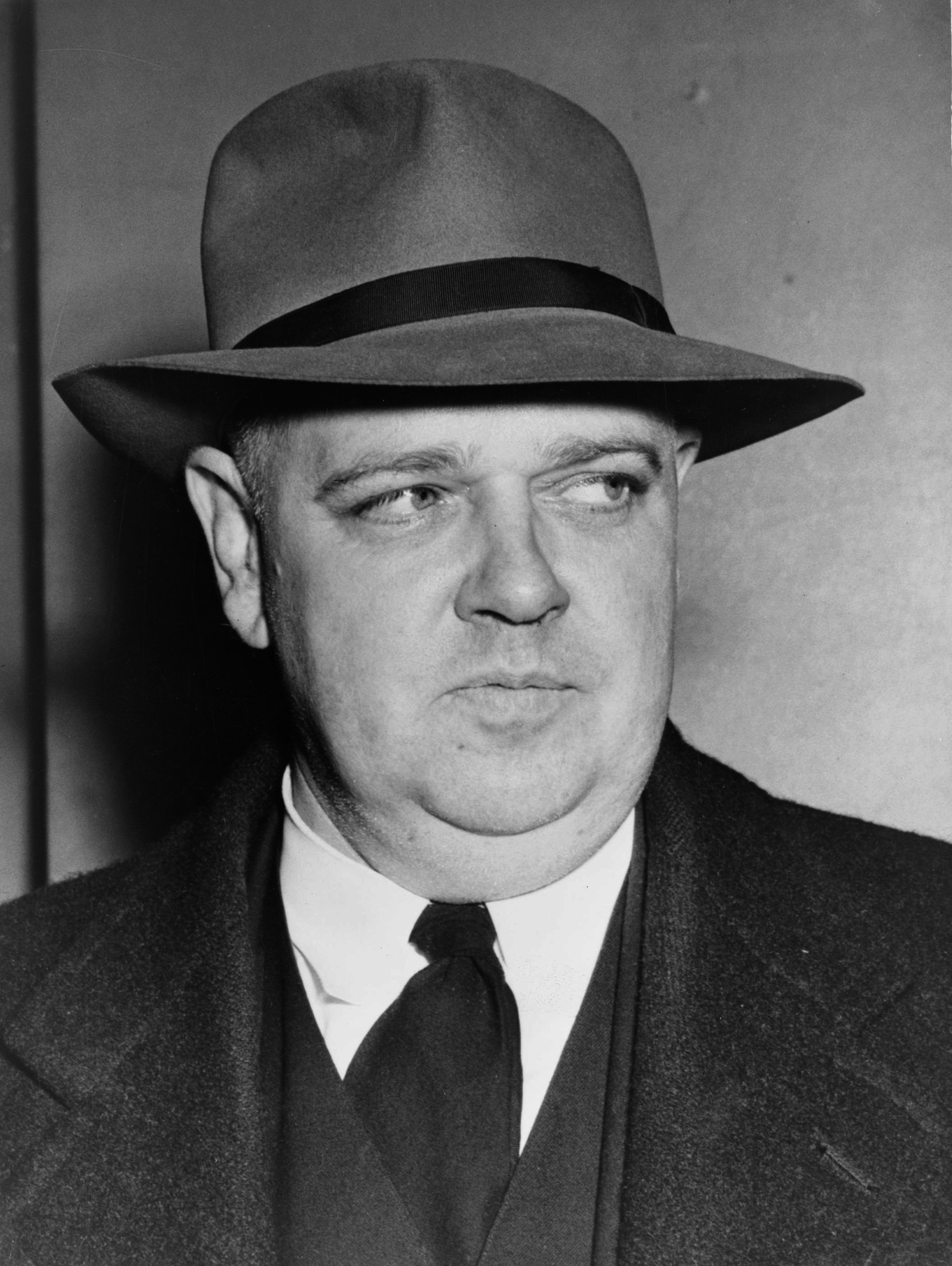
Whittaker Chambers (here in 1948) was a member of the JRC's 1932 National Executive Board.

The 1932 national convention elected the following JRC officers from various chapters to a "National Executive Board":

- Oakley C. Johnson, National Secretary (New York)
- Louis Lozowick, International Secretary (New York)
- Harry Carlisle (Hollywood)
- Whittaker Chambers (New York)
- Joseph Freeman (New York)
- Eugene Gordon (Boston)
- William Gropper (New York)
- Conrad Komorowski (Philadelphia)
- Duva Mendelsohn (Detroit)
- Charles Natterstad (Seattle)
- Jan Wittenber (Chicago)

=== Members ===
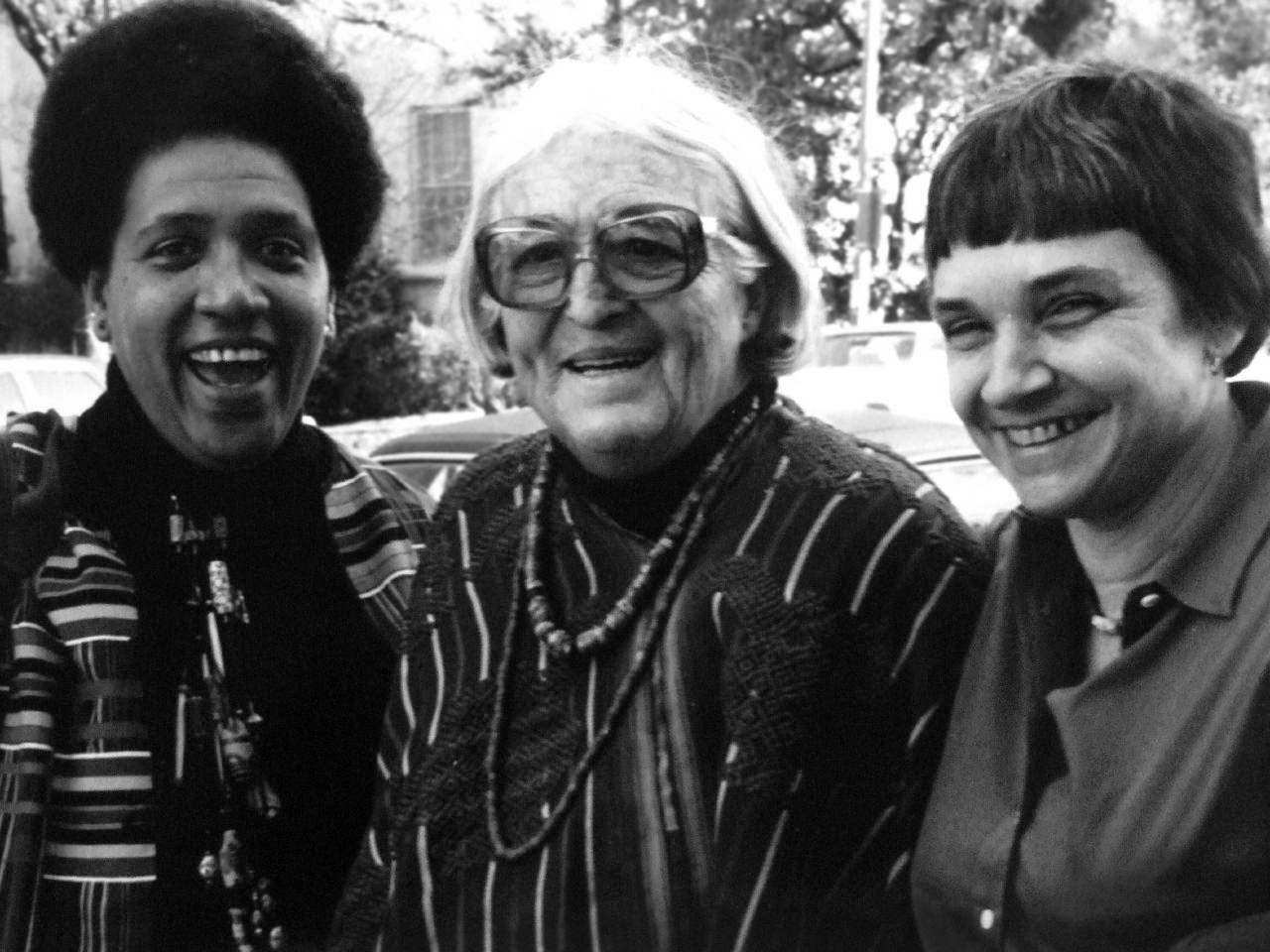
Meridel Le Sueur (between writers Audre Lorde left and Adrienne Rich right in Austin, Texas, in 1980) was a JRC member.

The John Reed Club had a somewhat prestigious membership in its early days among leftist circles. Later, it was sometimes used in reference as badge of shame by anti-communists.

- New York: Samuel Lewis Shane, Whittaker Chambers, Meyer Schapiro, Robert Cantwell, Jack Conroy, John Dos Passos, Langston Hughes, Kenneth Fearing, Grace Lumpkin, Joseph Freeman, Mike Gold Granville Hicks
- Chicago: Richard Wright and the artist Morris Topchevsky were members in Chicago. (In 1944, Wright distilled his uncomfortable experience in an Atlantic Monthly article, "I Tried to be a Communist".)

Prominent women writers who were JRC members include: Jan Wittenber, Grace Lumpkin, Tillie Lerner, Meridel Le Sueur, Josephine Herbst, and Clara Weatherwax.

Prominent African-American writers who were JRC members include: Eugene Gordon, Langston Hughes, Richard Wright, and Joe Jones.

== Assessment ==
In her 1977 work The John Reed Clubs, Laurie Ann Alexandre stated:

It would be inaccurate to call the John Reed Club a Marxist organization. Its charter simply stated that any member who recognized class struggle and wished to give it support would be welcomed. It cannot be said that the JRC was committed beyond that general point. Many of its members were not Marxists, and the Clubs spent little time educating its members in the theoretical underpinnings of Engels, Marx, or Lenin.

== Works ==
=== Books by the JRCs ===
- Harlan Miners Speak: Report on Terrorism in the Kentucky Coal Fields (1932)

=== Books by JRC members ===
Between 1929 and 1936, some 46 proletarian novels were published, in no small part supported by the John Reed Club.

Books published by JRC members during JRC years include (novels unless otherwise noted):

- Jews Without Money by Mike Gold (1930)
- Not Without Laughter by Langston Hughes (1930)
- To Make My Bread by Grace Lumpkin (1932)
- Success Story (play) by John Howard Lawson (1932)
- Pity Is Not Enough by Josephine Herbst (1933)
- Karl Marx's Capital in Lithographs (illustrations) by Hugo Gellert (1934)
- The Ways of White Folks (short stories) by Langston Hughes (1934)
- Mulatto (play) by Langston Hughes (1935)

=== Magazines ===
- Left Front (1933-1935): Magazine published by JRC's Chicago chapter and featuring Richard Wright
- Red Pen (later Left Review) from Philadelphia
- Cauldron from Grand Rapids
- New Force periodical from Detroit
- John Reed Club National Bulletin from Washington, DC
- Leftward from Boston
- Partisan from Los Angeles
- Anvil from Moberly, Mississippi
- Hammer from Hartford, Connecticut
- Partisan Review (1934-1936, 1937-2003): Magazine launched by JRC's home New York City chapter, suspended, and then resumed by breakaway writers Philip Rahv, William Phillips, Dwight Macdonald, F. W. Dupee

=== Catalogs ===
- John Reed Club Art School Catalogue, 1934-1935 (1934)

=== Art exhibitions ===
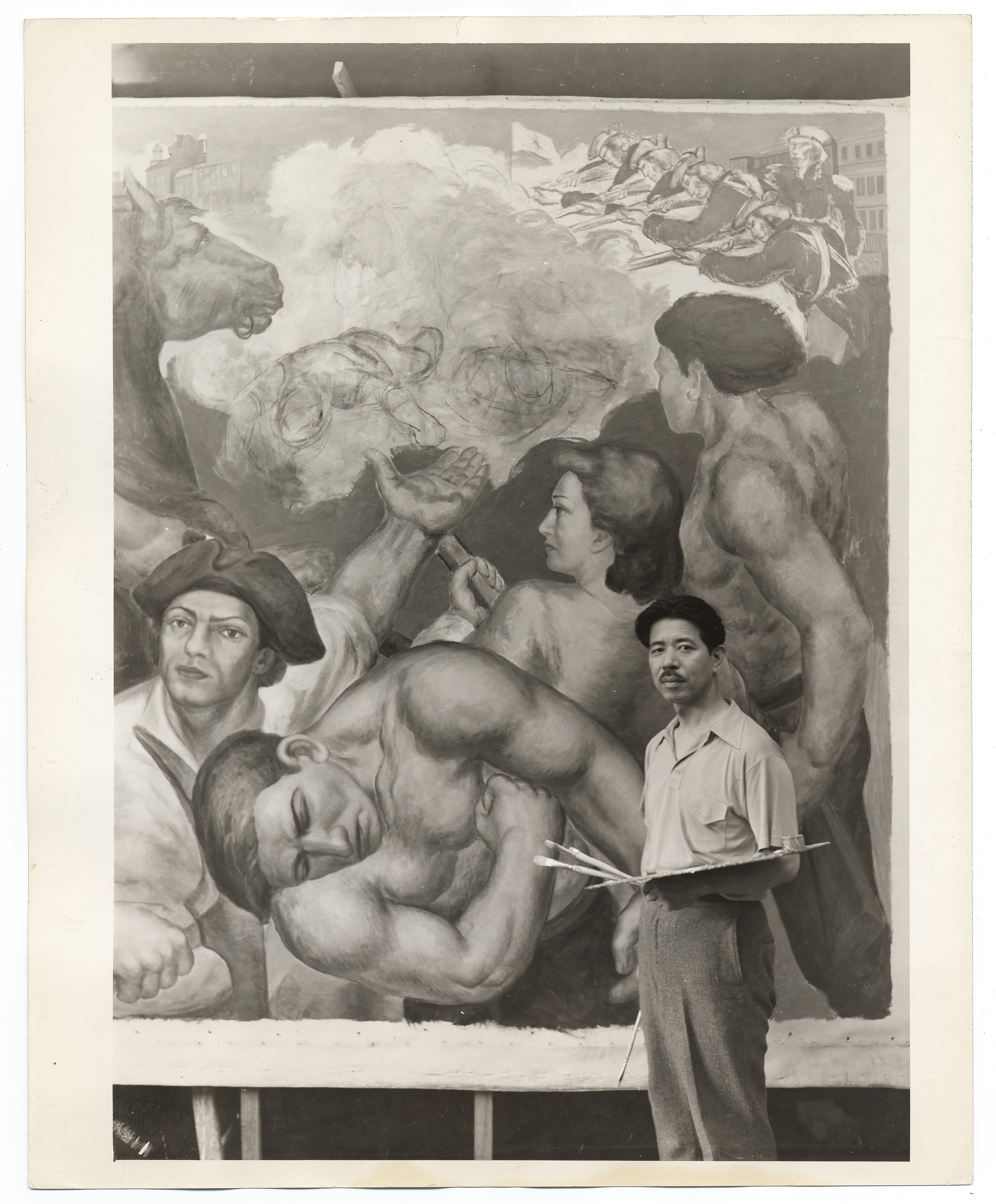
Eitaro Ishigaki (~1940 from Archives of American Art) was a JRC co-founder.

Artistic members of the John Reed Club of New York began holding art exhibitions in late 1929, shortly after the club's formation:

- 1929: The first art exhibition occurred at the United Workers' Cooperative Apartments (aka United Workers Cooperative Colony, aka "Commie Coops") on Bronx Park East in December 1929. Artists included: Jacob Burck, Fred Ellis, William Gropper, Eitaro Ishigaki, Gan Kolski, Louis Lozowick, Jan Matulka, Morris Pass, Anton Refregier, Louis Leon Ribak, Esther Shemitz, Otto Soglow, and Art Young.
- 1930: The second exhibition occurred in January 1930: 42 drawings, paintings, and lithographs that traveled from the Borough Park Workers' Club (43rd Street, Brooklyn) to other clubs in Brownsville, Williamsburg, the Bronx, and Manhattan.
- 1931: The third exhibition occurred in April 1931 with the "Proletpen", a Yiddish cultural group of the Communist Party: it comprised some 100 paintings, drawings, and cartoons by some 30 artists.
- 1932: "Twenty John Reed Club Artists on Proletarian and Revolutionary Themes" occurred at the American Contemporary Art (ACA) Gallery in November 1932: 36 paintings, drawings, and lithographs by 21 artists – Albert Abramowitz, Bard, Mark Baum, Joseph Biel, Jacob Burck, Dehn, Hugo Gellert, William Gropper, [William Hernandez], Eitaro Ishigaki, Limbach, Louis Lozowick, Moses Oley, Quirt, Anton Refregier, Philip Resman, Louis Leon Ribak, William Siegel, Soglow, Raphael Soyer, and Max Spivach. Four known works comprised Gellert's "Karl Max' Capital in Lithographs" (from a set of 60 lithographs).
- 1935: Another exhibition occurred again at the ACA Gallery in 1935: its theme was the Japanese invasion of Manchuria and included "Roustabouts" by Joe Jones.

The last known exhibition occurred at the ACA Gallery: its theme was "The Capitalist Crisis" and gained little notice outside of Communist press organs.

The site of the John Reed Club in New York held exhibitions of member work from the summer of 1930; it established a gallery there in 1932. Records are scarce for 1932–1935.

== See also ==
- New Masses
- Left Front
- Partisan Review
- American Artists' Congress
- League of American Writers
- List of members of the League of American Writers
- Union of Soviet Writers
- LAPD Red Squad raid on John Reed Club art show

== External sources ==
- James Gilbert, "Literature and Revolution in the United States: The Partisan Review," Journal of Contemporary History, vol. 2, no. 2 (April 1967), pp. 161-176. In JSTOR.
- Eric Homberger, "Proletarian Literature and the John Reed Clubs 1929-1935," Journal of American Studies, vol. 13, no. 2 (Aug. 1979), pp. 221-244. In JSTOR.
- Walter B. Rideout, The Radical Novel in the United States: 1900-1954: Some interrelations of Literature and Society (New York: Hill and Wang, 1966).
- Henry Hart, ed., The American Writers' Congress (New York: International Publishers, 1935).
- partial text of "I Tried to be a Communist", by Richard Wright
- Yale University Press: Artists on the Left by Andrew Hemingway
- NYU Grey Art Gallery: The Left Front: Radical Art in the "Red Decade," 1929–1940
- Northwestern University: The Left Front: Radical Art in the "Red Decade," 1929–1940
- Smithsonian Archives of American Art: Photo - Protest held by the John Reed Club and Artists' Union, 1934
