= Joshua Kunitz =

American journalist (1896–1980)

Joshua Kunitz (December 18, 1896 – March 2, 1980) was an American professor and journalist.

== Biography ==
Kunitz was born in Russia, where he was educated at the Slonimskoye Realnoye Uchilishche. After immigrating to the United States, Kunitz received his doctorate from Columbia University, entitled Russian Literature and the Jew. By the 1930s, Kunitz was active in the Communist Party. He was briefly expelled from the Communist Party because of his opposition to the Russian Association of Proletarian Writers, but was reinstated in 1932.He visited Moscow in the spring of 1930 and again five years later, describing his second trip as "one continuous gasp of wonderment" The first trip was as a participant in the 1930 Kharkov Conference of Revolutionary Writers, organized by the International Union of Revolutionary Writers. He was part of a group of international writers touring Central Asia, with Kunitz and Louis Lozowick the only Americans invited.

Kunitz taught courses in Marxism and literature at a school organized by the John Reed Clubs. Kunitz was critical of the presence of party functionaries in the Clubs, who he thought did not contribute to the intellectual activities. Due to his academic background, Kunitz was regarded as the American Communist Party's expert on Russian literature. He served on the editorial board of New Masses. He covered the Moscow Trials in a 1936 series of four articles for the magazine. In his reporting, Kunitz expressed some skepticism about the Trials, and the subsequent controversy lead to the expulsion of New Masses editor Joseph Freeman from the Party. Kunitz published Dawn Over Samarkand in 1935, a book based on his travels to Russia and describing the emergence of Communism in Central Asia and the Far East after the Russian Revolution. He was also a member of Partisan Review's editorial board on its first issue.

Kunitz was appointed as a Russian teacher at Cornell University's Intensive Russian Language and Culture Program, a move that attracted criticism because of his Communist sympathies. He replaced Vladimir Kazakevich in the role, after Kazakevich was deported to the Soviet Union. In 1948, after breaking with the Communist Party, he was appointed to the Middlebury Russian School as the assistant to the director.In 1953, Grace Lumpkin testified that Kunitz had threatened to "break [her] as a writer" if she wrote anything the contradicted the Communist Party's line. Kunitz died in Rochester, New York on March 2, 1980.

== Personal life ==
Kunitz's sister Sarah was also involved in the Communist Party during the 1930s and inspired Howard Fast to join the Party. (She later married journalist Alexander Kendrick). Granville Hicks described Kunitz as "quiet and scholarly, gentle and dependable". Kunitz was also the uncle of journalist Edith Efron.

== Bibliography ==
- Russian Literature and the Jew (1929)
- Voices of October: Art and Literature in Soviet Russia. (1930) Co-editor, with Joseph Freeman and Louis Lozowick.
- Dawn Over Samarkand: The Rebirth of Central Asia (1935)
- Russia, the Giant that Came Last (1947)
- Russian Literature Since the Revolution (1948)
