= Come to the Waldorf Astoria =

Poem by Langston Hughes

"Come to the Waldorf Astoria", also known as "Advertisement for the Waldorf-Astoria", is a two-page poem by Langston Hughes, accompanied by illustrations by Walter Steinhilber, which takes the form of a parody of a magazine advertisement. The poem was first published in The New Masses in December 1931 and later in Hughes's autobiography of that time period, The Big Sea. The poem is considered one of Hughes' most direct indictments of economic inequality of the 1930s.

== Structure ==
The first of six sections entitled "Listen Hungry Ones!" sets up the poem by taking quotes from the Vanity Fair advertisement and addressing those statements to poor people of New York. The second section, "Roomers" gives a description of the menu found at the Waldorf-Astoria Hotel to those accustomed to flop-houses and soup-lines. Next in "Evicted Families" the $10,000-a-year apartments are described. The fourth section "Negroes" is written in African-American vernacular and describes the Waldorf with a sarcastic awe. "Everybody," the penultimate section of poem, continues with details about amount of carpets used and addresses directly the very people unable to experience any of the luxuries of the Waldorf. The last section, "Christmas Card," takes the poem in a more directly political direction. The gulf between rich and poor can only be bridged by revolution and the poem ends on such a note: "Listen, Mary, Mother of God, wrap your new born / babe in the red flag of revolution: The Waldorf-Astoria's the best manger we've got." Surrounding the two-page poem the illustration appears to be a faithful depiction of an advertisement with bold, creative headings, but the caricatures in the large hotel in the center of the poem show people drinking and carousing while a car driving through the picture appears to be riding on a street made of the faces and bodies of other people.

== Context ==
The poem was composed in response to a multi-page advertisement for the new $28 million hotel Waldorf-Astoria hotel in New York. The Great Depression had begun to hit New Yorkers and disproportionately affected minorities in the city. The disparity between the rich and poor was widening at the onset of the Depression and Jim Crow laws furthered that economic hardship along racial lines. Hughes said of the poem: "The hotel opened at the very time when people were sleeping on newspapers in doorways, because they had no place to go. But suites in the Waldorf ran into thousands a year, and dinner in the Sert Room was ten dollars! (Negroes, even if they had the money, couldn't eat there. So naturally, I didn't care much for the Waldorf-Astoria.)"

== Critical response ==
The poem is viewed as a response to the economic milieu as well as cultural, racial, and class issues. "Advertisement for the Waldorf Astoria" is frequently grouped together with Hughes's other radical leftist writings of the 1930s. When Hughes first submitted his manuscript for The Big Sea, Carl Van Vechten found that "Advertisement for the Waldorf-Astoria" was "bad economics and bad poetry" but he nonetheless encouraged its inclusion in the collection stating that it was a part of Hughes's "essential history".

When it was published in The Big Sea in 1940 Richard Wright wrote of the poem that it exemplified the toughness of Hughes that he could approach even the solidarity he feels with the working class with "humor, urbanity, and objectivity".

Critics have argued that by parodying a high-priced advertisement for an even higher-priced hotel and juxtaposing those images with the most economically disadvantaged and those who would never be able to take advantage of the amenities offered by the hotel that Hughes was writing with the ideals of worker rights in mind that would later form the basis for the political and social ideals collectively referred to as the Popular Front. In his essay "The Adventures of a Social Poet" James Smethurst argues that "one of the most noted features of Popular Front aesthetics is a conscious mixing of genres and media – of 'high' and 'low,' of 'popular' and 'literary,' of Whitman and Eliot, of folk culture and mass culture, of literary and nonliterary documents." Hughes' use of vernacular mixed with high-brow cultural elements within "Advertisement..." reflects those ideals.
