= Isidor Schneider =

American poet

Isidor Schneider (August 23, 1896 in Horodenka, Galicia, Austria–August 3, 1977 in Manhattan, New York City, New York) was an American poet, novelist and critic.

== Career ==
Isidor Schneider was born in 1896 in Horodenka, one of four children born to Hyman and Sarah Schneider. His family came to the USA when he was six years old.

=== Literary career ===
Schneider contributed to many literary journals and magazines in his career. They included the left-leaning Menorah Journal (1920s) and New Masses (1930s and 1940s). He also published more literary works in The Nation (where he is still listed as an "author" and in Poetry magazine.

According to Al Filreis, professor of English at the University of Pennsylvania, Schneider moved from "standard Imagist ditties" in the 1920s to "full-fledged, narrative, descriptive Communist poetry -- poetry that was meant to summon people of the working class to not only take a place in the social scene and demand their rights but to a poetry that they could read, according to the poet in Schneider's case."

He was a Guggenheim Fellow for poetry in 1934.

=== Communist career ===
Like many literary Americans of the 1920s and 1930s, Schneider became very pro-Communist. Other like-minded literati with whom he interacted closely over the years include: Sherwood Anderson, Malcolm Cowley, Theodore Dreiser, Lillian Hellman, and Lewis Mumford.

Diana Trilling summarized Schneider's Communist career in highly personal terms:

Over these long years, I still think of the Schneiders as pre-eminent among the forgotten dead of the hoped-for Communist revolution in this country. They have their unmarked place in history as people whose lives were destroyed in the pointless and degrading service of Stalin. Or it may be that only Isidor's life was destroyed; Helen's was perhaps fulfilled as it would not have been if she had remained the discontented housewife she was when Lionel and I knew her... Still young when we knew him, Isidor had already achieved something of a reputation as a poet. He had also won critical attention with a novel in the experimental mode, Dr. Transit; somewhere it no doubt survives as a reminder of the territory which his imagination claimed for itself before it was enslaved by the Communist orthodoxy... The Communist movement rescued Helen Schneider from the dis-contents of her marriage. Within the Party she perhaps found men who were better suited to her needs than Isidor; report had it that she became the lover of one of the black Communist leaders. Determined to hold on to his wife, Isidor followed Helen into the Communist movement and became a writer for the Party's literary journal, the New Masses. The gender-myopic poet became one of the Party's most dependable hatchet men, a well-practiced and efficient literary executioner... Amid the crush and bustle of Macy's then-famous bookstore, he confessed to Lionel that he had never meant to be a Communist. He had intended only to be a poet and a private man. He had lost control of his life; it had moved in a direction he had not chosen for it. There was nothing unusual in intellectuals who were close to the Party, or even Party members, criticizing the Party to non-members: the novelist Joseph Freeman made a habit of cornering one with his complaints. But Isidor was admitting to more than dissent from this or that aspect of the official line. He was confessing to having surrendered his life for his marriage. He was still a craven servant of the Party when we last heard of him.

== Personal life ==
Schneider married Helen Berlin in Manhattan on January 12, 1925. The couple resided in Sunnyside in Queens, New York with a daughter. (Lewis Mumford had planned and designed Sunnyside.)

== Works ==
Schneider's papers are archived at Columbia University.

=== Works ===
==== Books ====
- Doctor Transit, Boni & Liveright, 1925
- The Temptation of Anthony: A Novel in Verse, and Other Poems, Boni and Liveright, 1928
- Comrade: mister, Equinox cooperative press, 1934
- From the Kingdom of Necessity (Novel), Putnam & Sons 1935
- The Judas Time, The Dial Press, 1947
- The World of Love, Volume 1, G. Braziller, 1964

==== Translations ====
- Mother by Maxim Gorky, The Citadel Press, 1947.
- Autobiography of Maxim Gorky: My Childhood, In the World, My Universities, The Citadel Press, 1949; Fredonia Books, 2001, ISBN 978-1-58963-505-0

==== Edited ====
- Proletarian Literature in the United States: an Anthology, edited by Granville Hicks, Joseph North, Paul Peters, Isidor Schneider and Alan Calmer; with a critical introduction by Joseph Freeman. International Publishers, New York 1934
