= Left Front (magazine) =

American magazine

Left Front Magazine (1933-1935) was an American magazine published by the Chicago chapter of the John Reed Club, itself a Marxist club for writers, artists, and intellectuals, named after the American journalist, activist, and poet, John Reed. The magazine is most famous for being a major early publishing venue of American author Richard Wright.

== Richard Wright ==
In 1933, Richard Wright joined the Chicago chapter of the John Reed Club at the urging of friend Abraham Aaron. The same year, he is elected executive secretary of the chapter and founded Left Front. By early 1934, Wright began writing poetry for the chapter's magazine, Left Front. He published poems "A Red Love Note" and "Rest for the Weary" in the January–February 1934 issue and became co-editor of the magazine at the same time. "Everywhere Burning Waters Rise" appeared in the May–June 1934 issue of Left Front.

== Demise ==
While some sources say the CPUSA shut down the magazine in 1935, its demise most likely came in August 1934 during a Midwest Writers Congress, when publisher Alexander Trachtenberg proposed replacement of the John Reed Club with a new (i.e., Party-sanctioned) organization called the First American Writers Congress.

== See also ==
- New Masses: magazine associated with the John Reed Club's New York chapter
- Daily Worker: newspaper published by the CPUSA from headquarters in Chicago
