= Walt Carmon =

American magazine editor and writer (1894–1968)

Walt Carmon (1894–1968) was an American magazine editor and writer best known for his years as managing editor of the Communist magazine the New Masses from 1929 to 1932. He also worked for a number of other magazines in smaller roles, which contributed to his becoming something of a frontman for the Midwestern radicals.

== Biography ==
=== Early years ===
Walt Carmon was born in New Jersey, played professional baseball in the midwest, and “spent time in Mexico with [New Masses founder and editor] Mike Gold during World War I” prior to entering the magazine world. He “worked for the Labor Defender (the publication of the Party-led International Labor Defense) and also assisted as circulation manager of the Daily Worker,” on which limited credentials (and a reputation as a midwestern radical) he was hired as managing editor at the New Masses and made the move from Chicago to New York.

=== New Masses years ===
Walt Carmon became managing editor for the Communist Party USA-affiliated New Masses in 1929. He was brought on, in part, due to the financial issues the magazine had been dealing with since its inception in 1926. To help confront this problem, he introduced New Masses masquerade balls, held in the fall and the spring. Founder and (since 1928) sole editor Mike Gold's name remained on the masthead as “editor,” but Carmon was effectively running the magazine, albeit “haphazard[ly].” Gold would show up to the office with less frequency as the Carmon years progressed, but Carmon's desk contained a drawer filled with “the scented love letters that poured in for Mike Gold.”

Carmon seems to have held a similar view to Mike Gold in regards to the ideal writer for the New Masses; both wanted the proletarian concern to be the primary and sole issue addressed by writers, and both encouraged worker-writer contributors. Carmon commented in an article about Langston Hughes’s Not Without Laughter that “under its black skin, real proletarian blood” ran through it. A similar sentiment was voiced towards Agnes Smedley’s Daughter of Earth; while he praised her in 1929 for being “a proletarian to the marrow,” he wrote in 1930 that her work was “‘marred…’ because it derived ‘its bias from the bitterness of a woman.’” Carmon’s suggestion that “class is essence” while race and gender (among other factors) are “mere epiphenomenon” has been critiqued by Barbara Foley as problematic for readers and contributors whose concern for the proletarian movement was held together with concerns for other aspects of societal oppression.

During his time at the magazine, the CP-USA shifted in two significant ways; the CP-USA affiliated John Reed Clubs were established, and the CP-USA's control on the New Masses began. The powerful Communist John Reed Clubs, which would become a source of drama and then competition for the New Masses, were founded when Carmon became frustrated with a number of young writers who were constantly hanging out in the New Masses’ office and getting in his way. According to poet Norman MacLeod and Rose Carmon (Walt Carmon’s wife), Carmon told the group to “go out and form a club” and to “call it the John Reed Club.” The Club became influential within the CP-USA. Later in Carmon's editorship, the CP-USA began their involvement in supervising and controlling the magazine, perhaps because Carmon was not a hard-line Communist even though he was a Party member. Rose Carmon recalls “that he was a disciplined Communist only when it served his purpose.” The CP-USA did not, however, fully control the magazine until after Carmon had been forced out of the magazine.

Although Carmon's staff was loyal to him, he was removed from his position in 1932 because the board of editors felt that there might be a better fit for editor of the New Masses. His relaxed, sometimes chaotic style did not help his case with the board any more than his affair with New Masses business manager Frances Strauss or his alcoholism, but ultimately the decision was made due to his not having “a big enough name” and the desire to shift towards a more explicitly political angle (which Carmon felt “was the province of the Daily Worker”); Carmon's emphasis on proletarian art and literature was seen as conflicting with the Communist Party's goals. Carmon's replacement (for a few months) was Whittaker Chambers.

=== Later years ===
After leaving the New Masses, Carmon continued to be involved with editing Communist affiliated periodicals. He and his wife “went to the USSR from 1932 to 1936, where [Carmon] was offered a job editing the English-language edition of the publication International Literature” and Soviet Travel, where he became connected with the Moscow News. Upon his return to the US, he worked “as a representative for Soviet publishing houses” and as “a correspondent for the Union of Soviet Writers” before leaving the public sphere and working as a bookkeeper in New Jersey until his death in 1968.
