= United States Post Office (Freeport, New York) =

- US Post Office-Freeport
- U.S. National Register of Historic Places
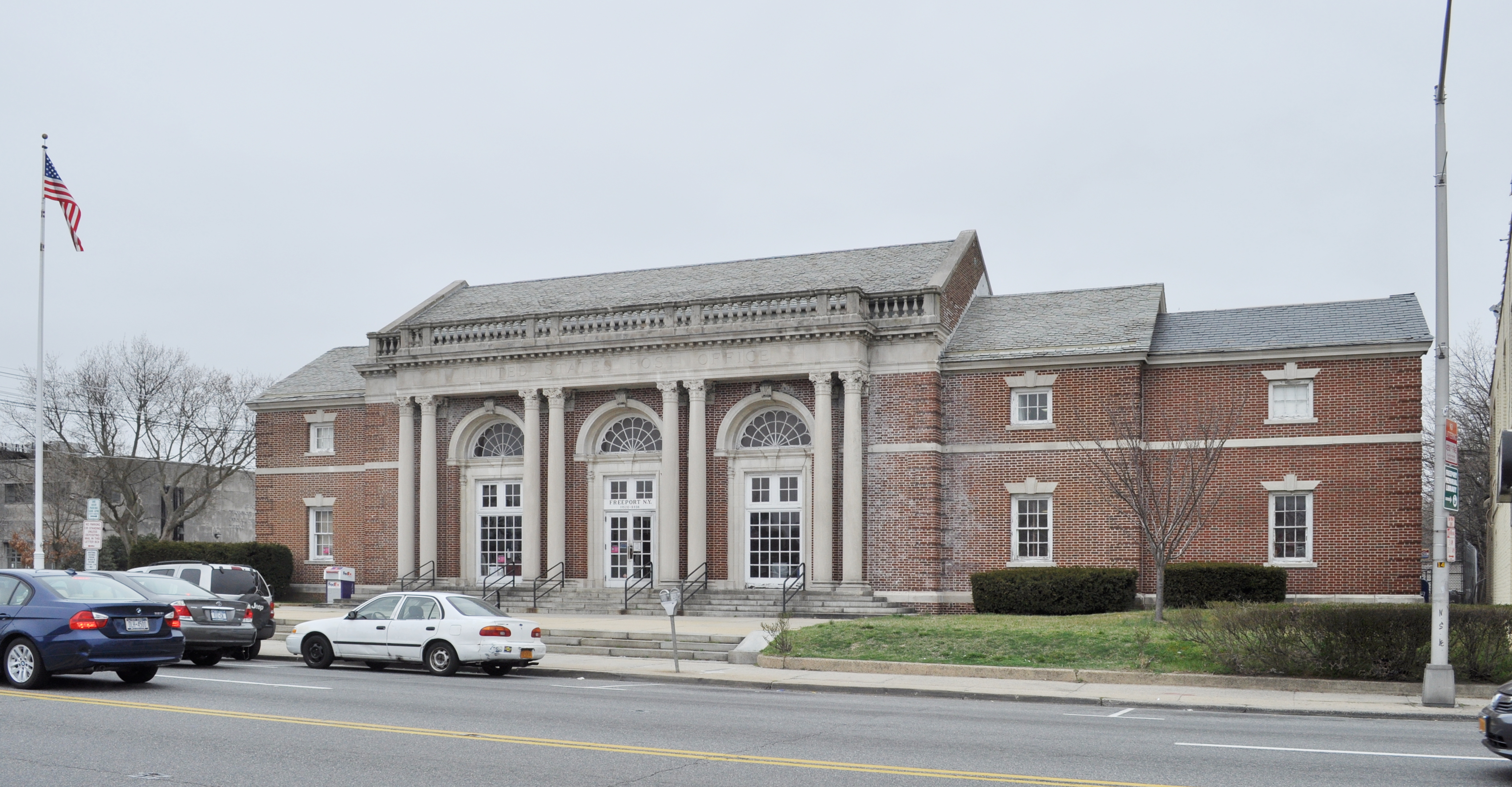
- Freeport Post Office, June 2009

- Location within New York Location within the United States
- Location: 132 West Merrick Road, Freeport, New York
- Coordinates: 40°39′13″N 73°35′10″W
- Area: less than one acre
- Built: 1932
- Architect: Tachau & Vought; murals: Gropper, William
- Architectural style: Colonial Revival
- MPS: US Post Offices in New York State, 1858-1943, TR
- NRHP reference No.: 88002517
- Added to NRHP: May 11, 1989

US Post Office-Freeport is a historic post office building located at Freeport in the town of Hempstead, Nassau County, New York, United States.

== Description ==
It was built in 1932 and designed by consulting architects Tachau and Vought for the Office of the Supervising Architect. It is a two-story, symmetrically massed brick building trimmed in limestone in the Colonial Revival style. It features a three bay wide entrance pavilion with a gable roof. The lobby features two murals by William Gropper installed in 1938 and titled "Air Mail" and "Suburban Post in Winter."

It was listed on the National Register of Historic Places in 1989.

== Gallery ==
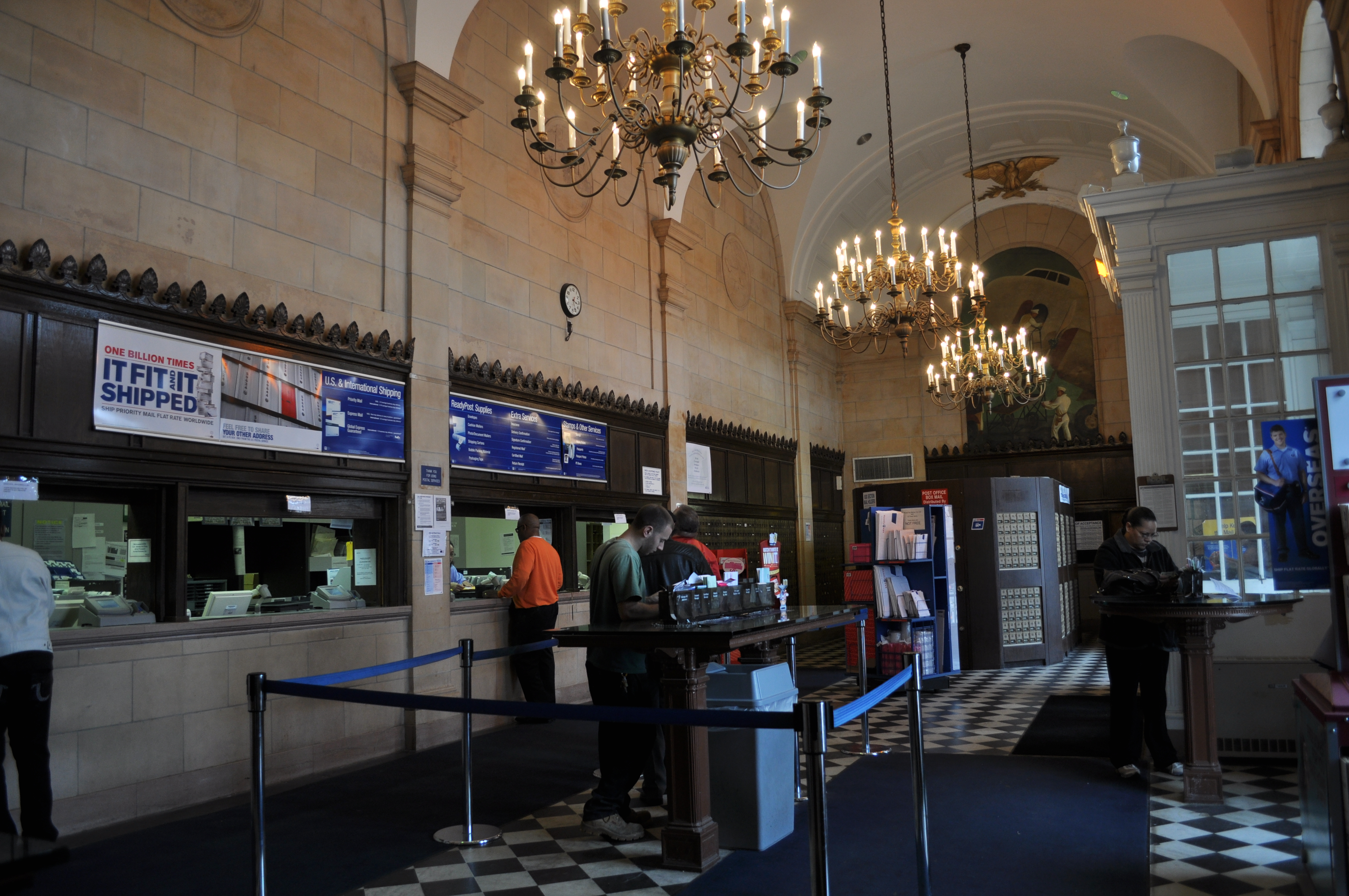
Interior, 2012

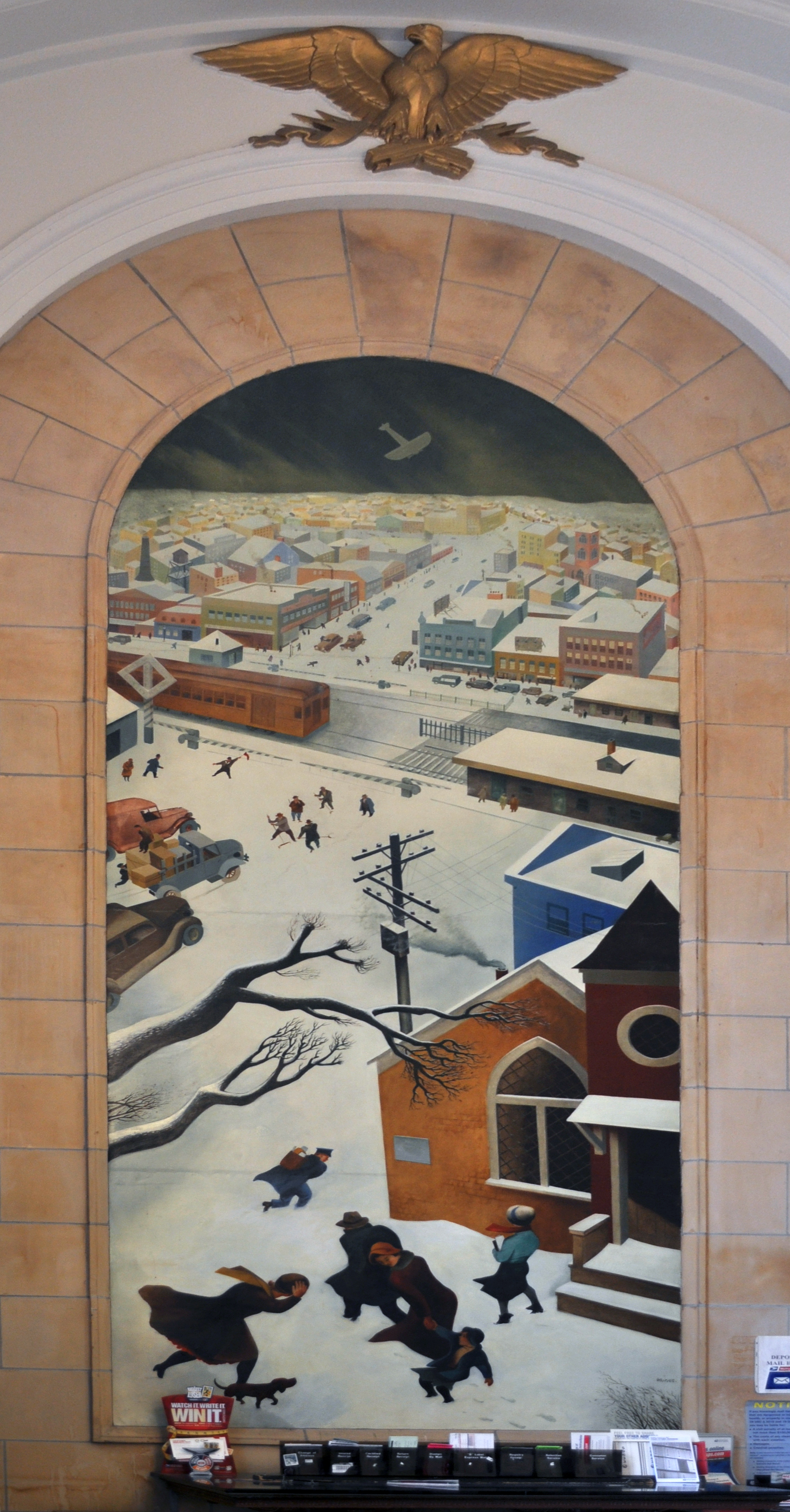
Interior detail: "Suburban Post in Winter", 1938 mural by William Gropper

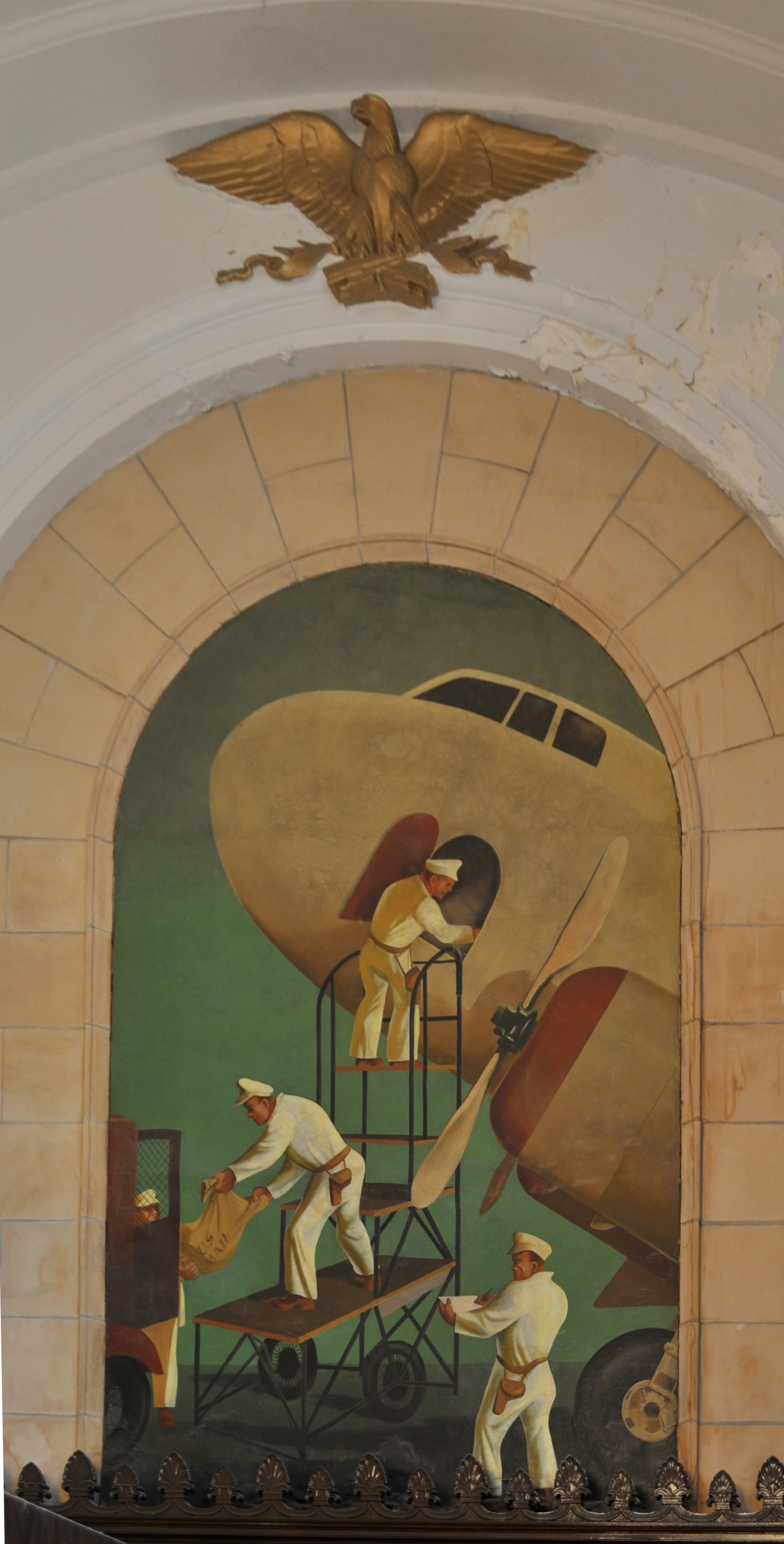
Interior detail: "Air Mail", 1938 mural by William Gropper
