= Stanley Burnshaw =

American poet

- Born: June 20, 1906; New York City, New York
- Died: September 16, 2005 (aged 99); Martha's Vineyard in Massachusetts
- Education: University of Pittsburgh, Columbia University, University of Poitiers, Sorbonne, Cornell University
- Known for: Poet, critic, author, editor, publisher, novelist
- Spouse: Susan Copen Oken
- Children: Valerie Razavi

Stanley Burnshaw (June 20, 1906 – September 16, 2005) was an American poet, primarily known for his ontology The Seamless Web (1970). His style was particularly writing political poems, prose, editorials, etc. Aside from political poetry, Burnshaw is known for his works on social justice.

== Family life ==
Raised by his parents, who immigrated from England, Stanley Burnshaw was born and brought up in New York City. There are few detailed depictions of his childhood, but in his later years Burnshaw wrote two poems giving light on that time period of his life. The first was a poem entitled "My Friend, My Father" which was about his childhood from the viewpoint of his father, and the second about his mother entitled "House in St. Petersburg". Burnshaw married Susan Copen Oken. Burnshaw had daughter, Valeri Razavi, and later became the grandparents to one grandson.

== Education ==
Burnshaw began his secondary education at the University of Pittsburgh, transferred to Columbia University, and then transferred back to the University of Pittsburgh again to earn his bachelor's degree. After saving up money, Burnshaw traveled to Europe in 1927 to attend the University of Poitiers and eventually Sorbonne University. Then in 1928, he returned to New York to attend graduate school at New York University and earned his Master's degree.

== Career ==
Burnshaw made a career plan to become a teacher and a writer. To save money and get started in his future career, Burnshaw started working at the Blaw-Knox Steel Corporation in Blawnox, Pennsylvania as an assistant copywriter. After he returned from Europe, Burnshaw began working at the Hecht Company in New York City as an advertising manager. Resigning from the Hecht Company in 1932, his next job was doing multiple duties (co-editor, drama critic, and occasional book reviewer) for The New Masses, a weekly editorial in New York City. In the 1930s Burnshaw got more interested in publishing. He first became the editor-in-chief for the Cordon Company in New York, then president and editor-in-chief of the Dryden Press (a firm he started) which merged with Holt, Rinehart and Winston in the late 1950s. Until 1968 Burnshaw was a consultant to the house and vice-president of Dryden Press. He published many prose, poems, books, editorials, and remained active in many other aspects of his career until his death in September 2005.

== Works ==
- Early and Late Testament (1952)
- Early and Late Testament
- Time of Brightness
- Bread
- The Iron Lands
- Do I Know Their Names?
- For a Workers' Road-Song
- All Day the Chill...
- Will You Remake These Worlds?
- A Coil of Glass
- Anchorage in Time
- This War Is Love
- Hero Statues
- Dialogue of the Heartbeat
- The Bridge
- Heartbeat Obbligato
- End of the Flower-World
- Looking for Papa
- Among Trees of Light
- Coasts of Darkness
- In Strength of Singleness
- Blood
- It Was Never This Quiet...
- When Was It Lost?
- Woodpecker
- Voices in Dearness...
- Song Aspires to Silence
- Anchorage in Time
- Two Men Fell in the Irish Sea
- Poetry: The Art
- Odes and Lyrics
- To a Young Girl Sleeping
- Innocence
- Wave
- Event in a Field
- The Fear
- Light Outlives All Shape
- Midnight: Deserted Pavements
- Random Pieces of a Man
- Waiting in Winter
- Outcast of the Waters
- Restful Ground
- Days
- Driving Song
- Willowy Wind
- The Hollow River
- Anonymous Alba: En un vergier soiz folha d'albespi
- Orléans: Le temps a laissié...
- Spire: Nudités
- Spire: Ce n'est pas toi...
- Spire: Nativité
- Spire: Un parfum éternel...
- Spire: Baisers
- Spire: Friselis
- Spire: Volupté
- Caged in an Animal's Mind (1963)
- Thoughts about a Garden
- Historical Song of Then and Now
- Summer
- Ravel and Bind
- Caged in an Animal's Mind
- Ancient of Nights
- Symbol Curse
- The Valley Between
- Thoughts about a Garden
- Petitioner Dogs
- Father-Stones
- Night of the Canyon Sun
- A Recurring Vision
- Midnight Wind to the Tossed
- The Axe of Eden
- Listen:
- Random Pieces of a Man
- 8Thoughts of the War and My Daughter
- A River
- Surface
- Preparation for Self-Portrait in Black Stone
- Mornings of St. Croix
- Boy over a Stream
- Letter from One Who Could Not Cross the Frontier
- Voyage: Journal Entry
- Nightmare in a Workshop
- Seven
- Clay
- A Rose Song
- Guide's Speech on a Road near Delphi
- Song of Nothings: In the Mountain's Shadow at Delphi
- I Think among Blank Walls
- Seedling Air
- Three in Throes
- Modes of Belief
- House in St. Petersburg
- Time Is a Double Line
- Akhmatova: The Muse
- George: Denk nicht zu viel...
- Éluard: L'Amoureuse
- Von Hofmannsthal: Eigene Sprache
- Alberti: El ángel bueno
- In the Terrified Radiance (1972)
- The Terrified Radiance
- The Terrified Radiance
- To a Crow
- Innocent War
- Gulls...
- Central Park: Midwinter
- The Finding Light
- Erstwhile Hunter
- Their Singing River (I)
- Not to Bereave...
- Underbreathing Song
- Emptiness...
- Procreations
- Women and Men
- Movie Poster on a Subway Wall
- End of a Visit
- The Echoing Shape
- Summer Morning Train to the City
- Women and Men
- Terah
- Isaac
- Talmudist
- What Plato Was
- Song of Succession
- En l'an...
- Dialogue of the Stone Other
- In the Coastal Cities
- Will of Choice
- Chanson Innocente
- The Rock
- Condor Festival
- Three Friends
- We Brought You Away As Before...
- Friend across the Ocean
- Wildness
- The Hero of Silence
- Dedication: An Eternity of Words
- Master and Pupils
- Soliloquy from a Window: Man and Flowers
- Dialogue before Waking
- Fume
- Into the Blond Torrent
- The Waking
- Second-Hand Poems
- Paz: Más allá del amor
- Spire: Retour des Martinets
- Alberti: Canción del ángel sin suerte
- Alberti: El ángel mentiroso
- Verhaeren: La Bêche
- Akhmatova: from "The White Flock"
- Unamuno: Me destierro...
- Mirages: Travel Notes in the Promised Land (1977)
- First Landscape
- Generations of Terror
- Blind Tale
- Seventh-day Mirage
- The Rock
- Talmudist
- Marching Song
- Choices
- Message to Someone Four Hundred Nights Away
- The House Hollow
- Argon
- Florida Seaside
- Old Enough at Last to Be Unsolemn
- Mind, If You Mourn at All
- To Wake Each Dawn
- Their Singing River (II)
- Speech, the Thinking-Miracle
- Man on a Greensward
- Social Poems of the Depression (from The New Masses and The Iron Land [1936])
- The Crane-Driver
- Street Song: New Style
- I, Jim Rogers
- Mr. Tubbe's Morning Service
- Notes on the Poems
- Selected Prose
- My Friend, My Father
- Stevens' "Mr. Burnshaw and the Statue"
- The Poem Itself: "Discussing Poems into English"
- Thomas Mann Translates "Tonio Kröger"
- A Future for Poetry: Planetary Maturity
- The Seamless Web
- Toward the "Knowable" Frost

== Sources ==
- "Stanley Burnshaw: An Inventory of His Papers at the Harry Ransom Humanities Research Center." The WATCH File: Writers, Artists and Their Copyright Holders. Web. 22 Sept. 2011. <http://research.hrc.utexas.edu:8080/hrcxtf/view?docId=ead/00022.xml>.
- Burnshaw, Stanley. "Table of Contents and Excerpt, Burnshaw, The Collected Poems and Selected Prose." Home | The University of Texas at Austin. Web. 22 Sept. 2011. <http://www.utexas.edu/utpress/excerpts/exburcol.html>.
- Martin, Douglas. "Stanley Burnshaw; Man of Letters, Friend of Poet Robert Frost | The San Diego Union-Tribune." San Diego News, Local, California and National News - SignOnSanDiego.com. Web. 22 Sept. 2011. <http://www.signonsandiego.com/uniontrib/20050925/news_mz1j25burnsh.html>.
- "UGA Press View Book." UGA Press Home Page. Web. 22 Sept. 2011. <http://www.ugapress.org/index.php/books/stanley_burnshaw>.
- Martin, Douglas. "Stanley Burnshaw, Poet, Editor and Critic, Dies at 99" The New York Times. 17 Sept. 2005. 19 June 2022. <https://web.archive.org/web/20121113025345/http://www.nytimes.com/2005/09/17/arts/17burnshaw.html?_r=5&>.
