= Betty Millard =

American Communist feminist (1911–2010)

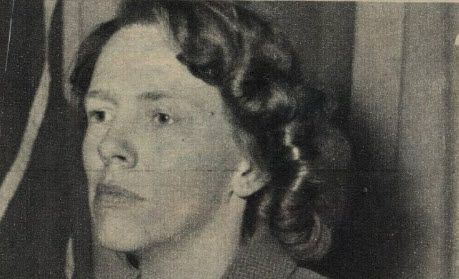
- Born: October 12, 1911
- Died: March 5, 2010 (aged 98)
- Known for: Feminist activism

Elizabeth Boynton Millard (October 12, 1911 – March 6, 2010) was a writer, artist, political activist, philanthropist, and a feminist. She is known for her feminist publication "Woman against Myth", as well as her involvement with the United States Communist Party in the 1940s and 1950s.

== Early life ==
Millard was born in Highland Park, Illinois, on October 12, 1911, to a wealthy, conservative family. Her mother, Elizabeth (Bessie) Bell Boynton (1882–1980) was a Smith College student from 1900 to 1902 who studied painting, sculpture, and music, and later became an artist. Her father, Everett Lee Millard (1877–1933) was an attorney. Betty was the second of four children; younger to Everett Lee (Chevy) Millard, Jr. (1909–2000); older to Malcolm (Mac) S. Millard (1914–1999), and Graham Millard (1921–1921).

Millard attended the University of Chicago from 1930 to 1932, then moved to New York City to attend Barnard College in 1932. At Barnard, Millard discovered political activism when she marched against the United States' support for fascist leader, Francisco Franco, during the Spanish Civil War. She graduated from Barnard College in 1934 and enrolled at Columbia Law School, but left after one year in order to pursue her activism. Millard joined the Young Communist League in 1936 and the Communist Party in 1940. In 1935, she moved to Greenwich Village, where she was based for the rest of her life.

== Feminism and political activism ==
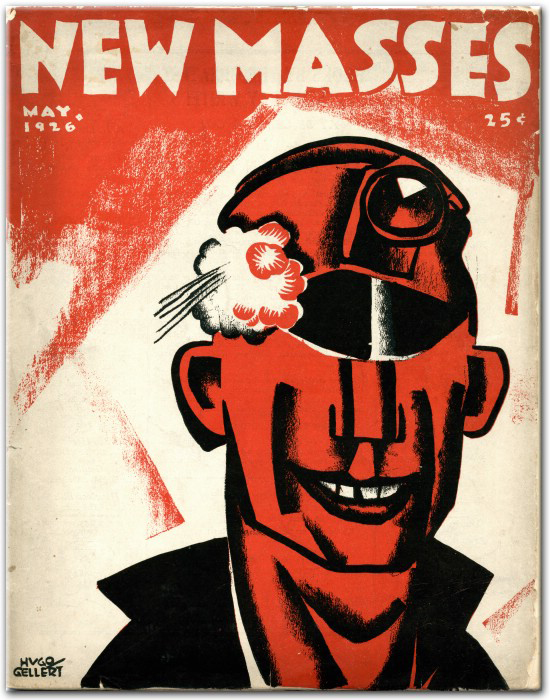
Cover of the May 1926 issue of New Masses magazine. Millard worked as an editor and writer at the magazine from 1943-1947.

From 1943-1947, Betty Millard worked as an editor and writer at the New Masses, a publication focused on American Marxism. In 1947, during her time at the New Masses, Betty wrote the key feminist text, "Woman Against Myth." It was published as a 24-page pamphlet in 1948 distributed with the magazine and was released by International Publishers later that year. "Woman Against Myth" examined the history of the women’s movement in the United States, in the socialist movement, and in the USSR. In it, Millard argued that male supremacy was a pressing issue both outside and within the Communist movement.

From 1949-1951, Betty Millard worked in Paris and Berlin as the American secretary in the directorate of the Women’s International Democratic Federation (WIDF). The WIDF was a post-war, radical feminist organization that aligned with the global Communist movement. Millard was also active in the Congress of American Women (CAW), an affiliate of WIDF. Her work for both organizations took her to France, Italy, the Soviet Union, Poland, Hungary, China, Finland, Denmark, Switzerland, and Germany. When she returned to the United States in 1951, her passport was lifted due to suspected Communist affiliation.

From 1951-1956, Betty Millard worked as an editor and writer at the magazine Latin America Today, reporting on the political and social developments south of the United States border. In April 1959, Millard was subpoenaed to testify as a hostile witness before the House of Un-American Activities Committee during the McCarthy trials. The House was investigating the Congress of American Women, Millard’s work for them, and her personal political views. Millard left the Communist Party in the late 1950s – possibly as a result of the Khrushchev revelations, or possibly out of dissatisfaction with the party’s hostile viewpoints on feminism, women’s rights and gay rights.

Betty Millard spent the remainder of her life traveling to various parts of the world, often in service of advocacy. Betty Millard supported many activist organizations, especially in Latin America. She worked on campaigns such as organizing a committee to free the Mexican muralist, David Siqueiros, from prison, movements that were against the Vietnam War, environmentalism, and later in her life, she joined the fight for lesbian and gay rights. Millard was also a philanthropist and supported various activist groups, including the North Star Fund, which worked to create a more equitable and democratic city for all New Yorkers. In 1960, Millard developed a passion for photography and installed a darkroom on the top floor of her Greenwich Village brownstone. Millard studied photography with Paul Caponigro, Lisa Modell, and Ansel Adams. She was interested in photography of nature, political struggles, and portraiture. Millard created “picture stories” while traveling including on trips up the Essequibo and Pomeroon Rivers in then-British Guiana; visiting the artist, David Alfaro Siqueiros, at work in his studio; and to Chile in 1970 to photograph Chilean mural art.

Millard traveled through colonial British Guiana with politician Cheddi Jagan as he campaigned for chief minister, and later, premier. She spoke alongside Jagan at an event in New York City shortly after he was elected President of Guyana on December 5, 1992. In this, her last public speaking appearance, she compared Jagan’s early campaign-trail appeal to that of the recently elected U.S. president, Bill Clinton.

== Later years ==
Despite privately writing about her struggles with her sexual orientation in journals, Millard did not come out as gay until her late 80s except to close family and friends. Millard often referenced her crushes on schoolmates in her journals and described her younger self as bisexual. Due to the social implications of being gay and the explicit homophobia of the Communist Party, Millard took measures to reject this part of her life by seeking conversion therapy from 1942 to 1948; she was hospitalized in 1956 for a breakdown related to her struggles with her sexuality. Despite this, Millard had several important long-term relationships with women prior to, and after, coming out.

Millard enjoyed writing short stories and poetry, most of which were autobiographical. Some of Millard’s writing was anthologized, and others can be found in The Guardian. In 1960, Millard purchased a small farm in Dutchess County, upstate New York and regularly spent time there.

Millard died on March 6, 2010, at her home in New York City, New York.
