= Jacob Burck =

Polish-born Jewish-American painter & sculptor

- Jacob Burck in 1953
- Born: Yankel Boczkowsky; January 10, 1907; Wysokie Mazowieckie, Congress Poland, Russian Empire
- Died: May 11, 1982 (aged 75); Chicago, Illinois, U.S.
- Education: Art Students League
- Known for: painting, sculpture, cartooning
- Notable work: If I Should Die Before I Wake
- Style: Proletarian Art
- Spouse: Esther Kriger
- Awards: 1941 Pulitzer Prize for Editorial Cartooning

Jacob Burck (née Yankel Boczkowsky, January 10, 1907 – May 11, 1982) was a Polish-born Jewish-American painter, sculptor, and award-winning editorial cartoonist. Active in the Communist movement from 1926 as a political cartoonist and muralist, Burck quit the Communist Party after a visit to the Soviet Union in 1936, deeply offended by political demands there to manipulate his work.

Upon his return to the United States, Burck drew political cartoons for two large mainstream dailies, the St. Louis Post Dispatch and then, for 44 years, the Chicago Daily Times (later as the Chicago Sun-Times). Burck was awarded the 1941 Pulitzer Prize for Editorial Cartooning.

== Biography ==
=== Early years ===
Jacob Burck was born Yankel Boczkowsky on January 10, 1907, in Wysokie Mazowieckie, Poland (then Russia), the son of ethnic Jewish parents, Abraham Burke, a bricklayer, and Rebecca Lew Burke.

Burck emigrated to the United States at age six and lived in Cleveland until 1924. He attended the Cleveland School of Art on a scholarship after he was discovered on a Cleveland sidewalk sketching instead of attending elementary school.

When he was seventeen years old, Burck travelled to New York City to study at the Art Students League of New York (ASL) under Albert Sterner and Boardman Robinson. Burck's circle of friendships with his fellow students there, such as Reginald Marsh, and the other artists, intellectuals, and political activists of 1930s New York, were to shape the course of his career. At the ASL he met and later married fellow art student Esther Kriger, in 1930.

=== New York years ===
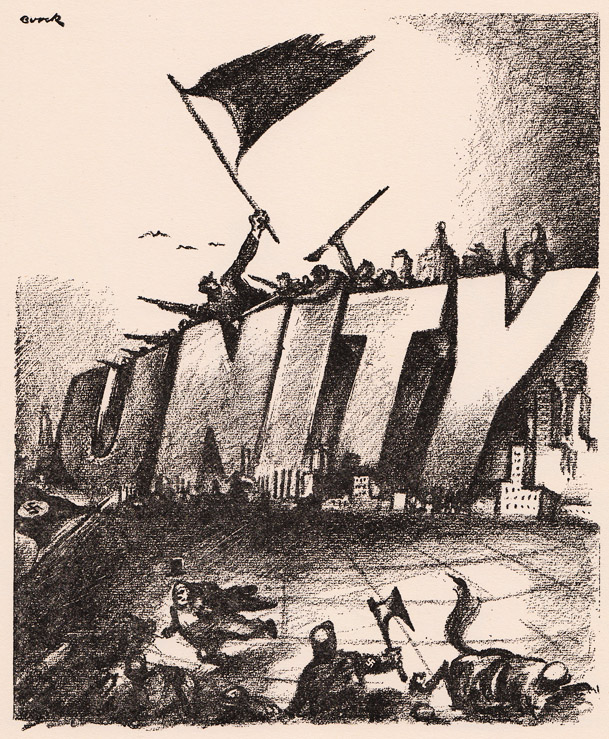
"Working Class Bulwark," a cartoon by Burck from The Daily Worker, circa 1934.

Burck first worked professionally as an artist as a portrait painter, an occupation which he pursued full-time for one year. He subsequently worked for a short time as a sign painter, his 1935 official biography claiming this decision was related to Burck's belief that this constituted "a more wholesome means of earning a living [than painting society portraits]." Nevertheless, Burck continued his artistic practice, including portraiture.

Burck joined the revolutionary movement in 1926, while still a teenager. In 1927 or 1928, Burck began to draw occasional editorial cartoons for the Communist Party's daily newspaper, The Daily Worker, as well as its monthly artistic-literary magazine, The New Masses. He went on staff at The Daily Worker full-time as cartoonist in 1929.

Burck's political cartoons were a regular feature in the Daily Worker's annual collection, Red Cartoons, published each year from 1926 to 1930. His material was also gathered for a full-length book in 1935, a 248-page work entitled Hunger and Revolt.

Burck was close friends with Alexander Calder, Whittaker Chambers (husband of ASL classmate Esther Shemitz), Langston Hughes, Meyer Schapiro, and many other figures in the New York art and progressive scene. During this period, he exhibited with other prominent artists, including: George Grosz, José Clemente Orozco, Diego Rivera, Reginald Marsh, Jean Charlot, Thomas Hart Benton, Hugo Gellert, William Gropper, David Alfaro Siqueiros, Julio Castellanos, John Flannagan (sculptor), and Louis Lozowick.

In 1931, Burck was a founding Director of the "New York Suitcase Theater", along with playwright Paul Peters, poet Langston Hughes, and writer Whittaker Chambers. Burck's work was exhibited in the Whitney Museum of American Art's First Biennial Exhibition of Contemporary American Sculpture, Watercolors and Prints, which opened in December, 1933.

Evidence presented to the Dies Committee lists Burck in May 1933 as a contributing editor (with Henri Barbusse, Cyril Briggs, Whittaker Chambers, Robert W. Dunn, Maxim Gorky, Harry Gannes, Grace Hutchins, Robert Minor among others) of Labor Defender, the monthly magazine of International Labor Defense, the American Communist Party's legal defense organization. He also contributed work to the official organ of the party's social and fraternal organization, the International Workers Order.

In 1934, "The American Scene No. 1: A Comment upon American Life by America's Leading Artists" was published, a portfolio of six lithographs by Burck and his colleagues, George Biddle, Adolf Dehn, George Grosz, Reginald Marsh, and José Clemente Orozco.

Burck was an accomplished muralist and exhibited groups of murals along with Edward Laning in the gallery of the Art Students League. Burck was commissioned by the Soviet travel agency, Intourist, to create a five-panel mural for its New York offices, depicting the construction of large-scale industry in the Soviet Union. A New York Times review of studies for the murals stated, "Mr. Burck has arranged his figures with uncommon skill, achieving a pattern of splendidly organized vitality." Plans were changed however and the panels were shipped to Moscow for display at the Museum of Modern Western Art prior to being installed in Intourist's Moscow office. This was a period in which the so-called "Cult of Personality" around Soviet leader Joseph Stalin was in full swing. While adapting the murals for the new location, Burck took umbrage to the Soviet government's insistence that he modify the content of his work to glorify Stalin. The couple returned without completing the mural. This episode marked the end of Burck's connection with the Communist movement.

=== Chicago years ===
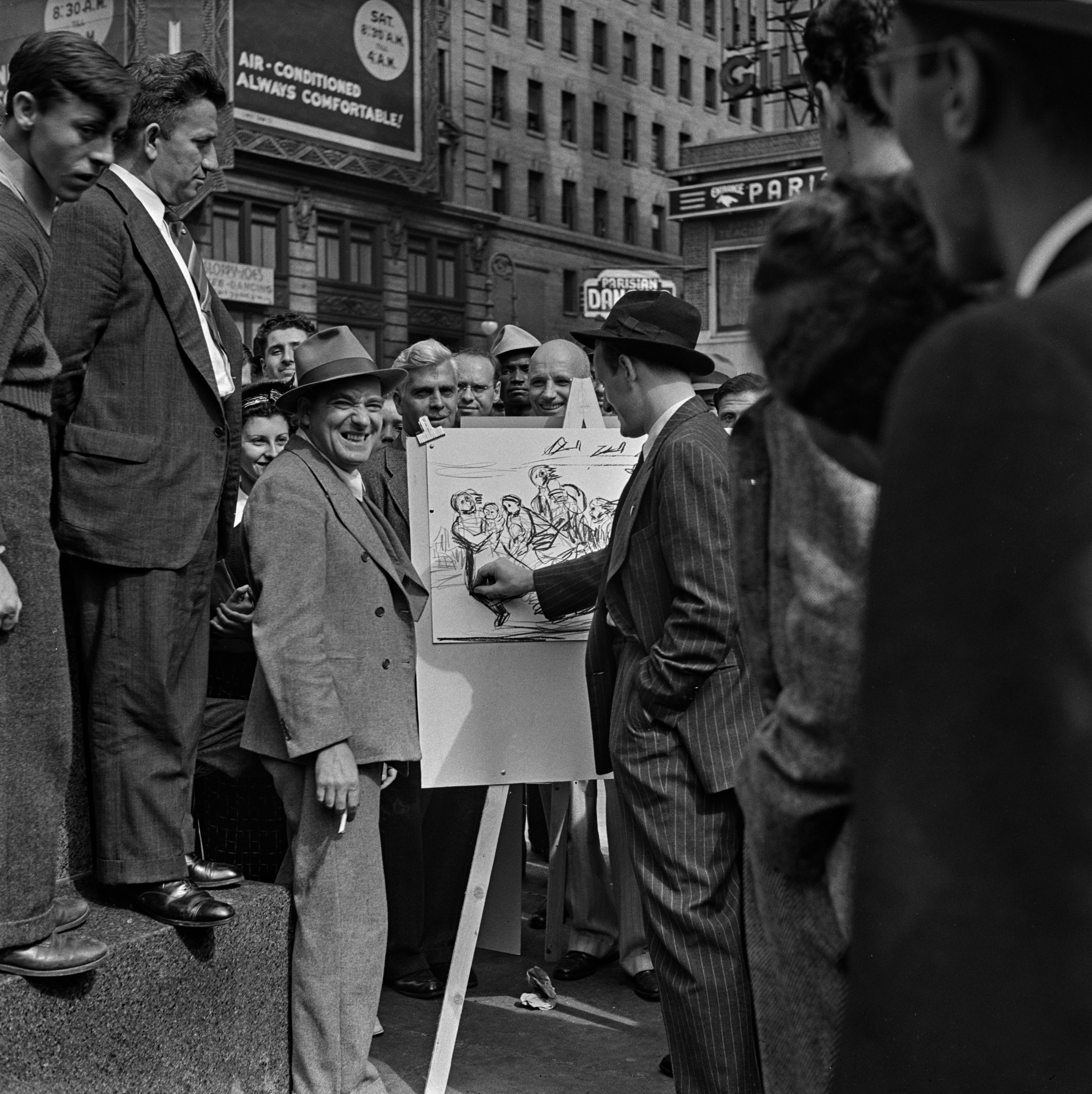
Burck draws in Times Square, New York to raise money for the Loyalists in the Spanish Civil War, 1938. Behind the canvas, left to right: William Gropper, Fred Ellis, Rockwell Kent.

After returning from the USSR in 1937, Burck went to work as an editorial cartoonist for the St. Louis Post Dispatch, before moving to the Chicago Daily Times in 1938. Burck's incisive and biting style led to his daily cartoons being syndicated by Field Newspaper Syndicate of Field Enterprises in more than 200 newspapers across the United States. Burck's signature style, with India ink with brush, grease pencil, or lithograph crayon, was soon adopted by Bill Mauldin and most other editorial cartoonists of the 1940s and 1950s.

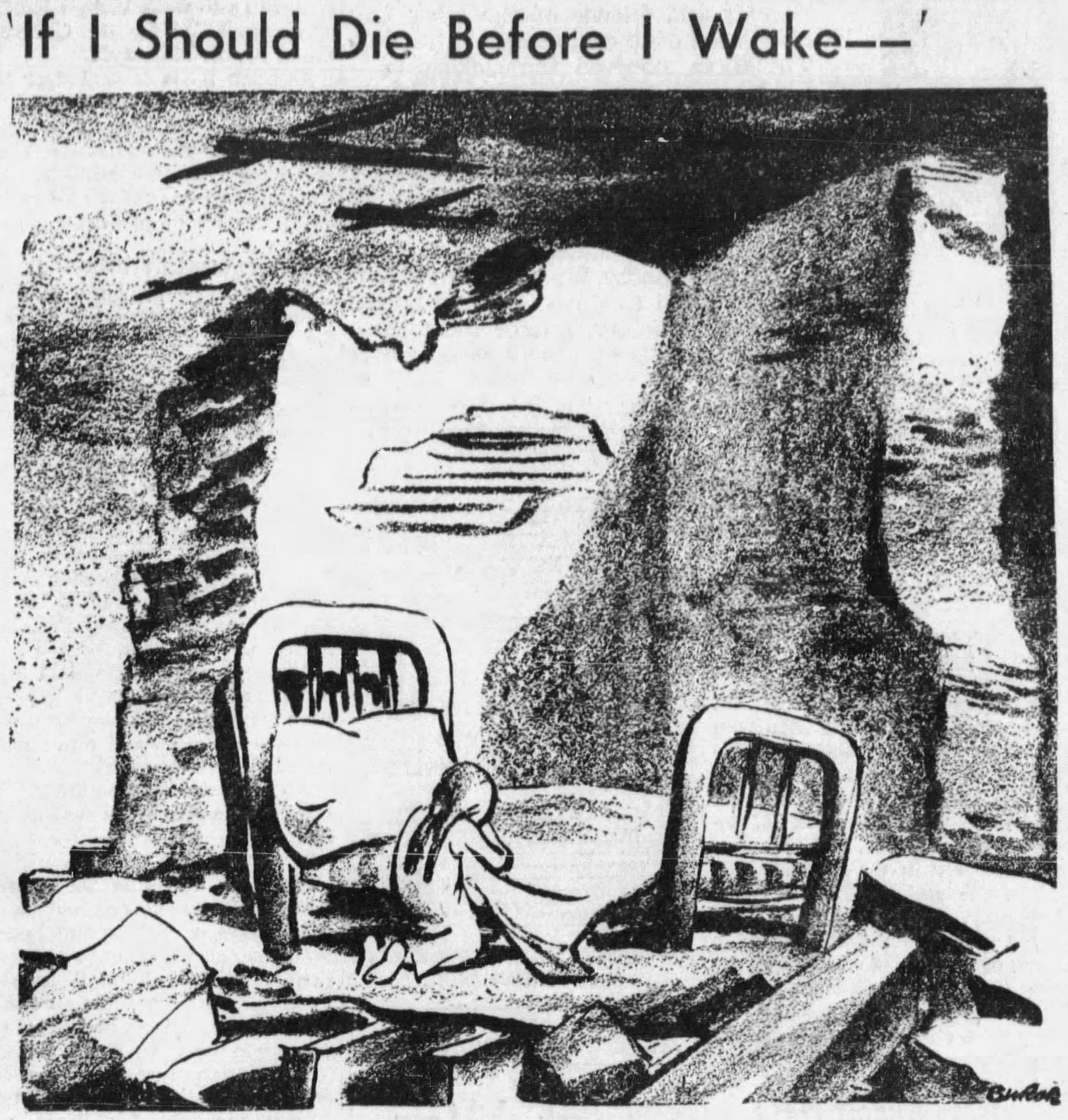
"If I Should Die Before I Wake", for which Burck received the Pulitzer Prize for Editorial Cartooning

Burck won the Pulitzer Prize for Editorial Cartooning while at the Chicago Daily Times in 1941 for a cartoon titled, If I Should Die Before I Wake. In 1942, he received the inaugural Society of Professional Journalists prize for editorial cartooning, the Sigma Delta Chi Award.

Burck's continued style and criticism through cartooning of politicians, hypocrisy, and social injustice left him an open target during the Second Red Scare of the 1950s. Senator Joseph McCarthy and the House Un-American Activities Committee investigated his early, radical associations. In 1953, they attempted to have the bohemian Burck (who had neglected to formalize his US citizenship) deported. The Government claimed that Burck had joined the Communist Party in 1934 and remained a member at least through 1936. Burck denied ever joining the Party, claiming membership had been pressed on him by his employer, the Daily Worker. Further, witness for the government, Paul Crouch, testified in Burck's deportation hearing that he had often seen him at Communist Party meetings, yet Crouch failed to correctly identify Burck at that hearing and was subsequently revealed to be a serial perjurer.

Burck's defense was able to demonstrate "a long record of anti-communism... [was] exemplified in his political cartoons." Charges were eventually dropped after a sustained legal defense funded personally by the publisher of the Chicago Sun-Times, Marshall Field III. The deportation order was formally vacated by an act of the United States Congress in April 1957.

Burck's syndications dropped drastically because of the government case, but he continued to produce daily editorial cartoons for the Chicago Sun-Times, successor to the Chicago Daily Times, over a 44-year career.

A long-time member of the Cliff Dwellers Club in Chicago, Burck received the 1971 Merit Award "for distinguished service to the arts in Chicago."

Burck's final published editorial cartoon appeared in the Chicago Sun-Times on February 23, 1982. Over the course of his career he was responsible for drawing over 10,000 editorial cartoons.

== Personal life and death ==
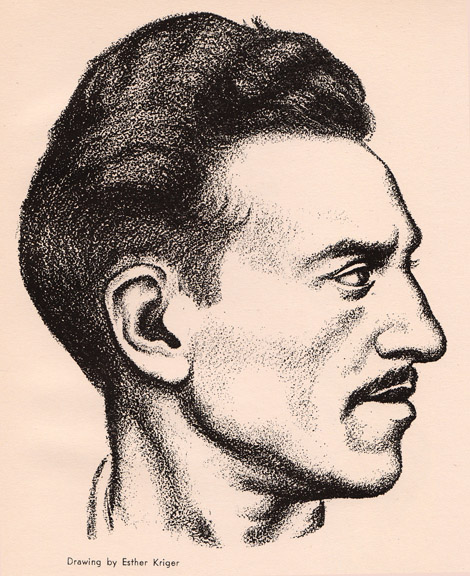
Portrait of Burck by his wife Esther c. 1935

In 1930, Burck married Esther Kriger, a fellow artist; they had two children.

Jacob Burck died on May 11, 1982, at the age of 75, of injuries sustained in a fire in his home caused by a smoldering cigarette. He was preceded in death by his wife (1975) and survived by children Joseph M. Burck (senior designer at Marvin Glass and Associates) and Conrad Burck, an art dealer who showed, among others, Egon Weiner, William Christoffersen and Francisco Farreras.

== Works ==
=== Art ===
Burck was a prominent painter and sculptor through the 1960s and 1970s.

Burck's original works were collected by several presidents of the United States including Harry S Truman and Richard Nixon. Burck's work is also in the permanent collections of the Museum of Modern Art, The Smithsonian Institution, The National Gallery of Art, The Art Institute of Chicago, the Whitney Museum of American Art, the Philadelphia Museum of Art, the Museum of Fine Arts, Boston, the Cleveland Museum of Art, the Baltimore Museum of Art, and the University of Michigan Museum of Art.

His evocative portrait of Hugh Hefner, the smoke from Hef's pipe forming a group of writhing bodies, hung in the Playboy mansion in Chicago.

His work is part of the "Capital and Labor" portion of the Library of Congress online exhibit Life of the People: Realist Prints and Drawings from the Ben and Beatrice Goldstein Collection, 1912–1948.

=== Books ===
According to art historian Andrew Hemingway, "Burck was singled out for special treatment in 1935 when the Daily Worker published a 250-page volume of his cartoons under the title Hunger and Revolt. The book also contained 11 essays by prominent people including John Strachey and Henri Barbusse.

(In addition, Hemingway notes, "Within the John Reed Club Burck had a reputation as a formidable polemicist who was widely read in the 'history and theory of art.' His occasional pieces in the Daily Worker certainly show him as a capable writer, and in 1935 he published an article "For Proletarian Art" as part of a debate in the American Mercury.")

- Red Cartoons from the Daily Worker 1928] (contributor)
- 1929 Red Cartoons reprinted from The Daily Worker (1929)
- Graft and Gangsters (1931)
- Hunger and Revolt: Cartoons (1935)
- Futuro: Cartones de Jacob Burck (1935)
- Our 34th President: Ike's Campaign, Election and Inauguration in Historic Cartoons] (1953)

=== Awards ===
- 1941: Pulitzer Prize for Editorial Cartooning for "If I Should Die Before I Wake"
- 1942: Sigma Delta Chi Award, inaugural prize for editorial cartooning from the Society of Professional Journalists
