= William Gropper =

American cartoonist and muralist (1897–1977)

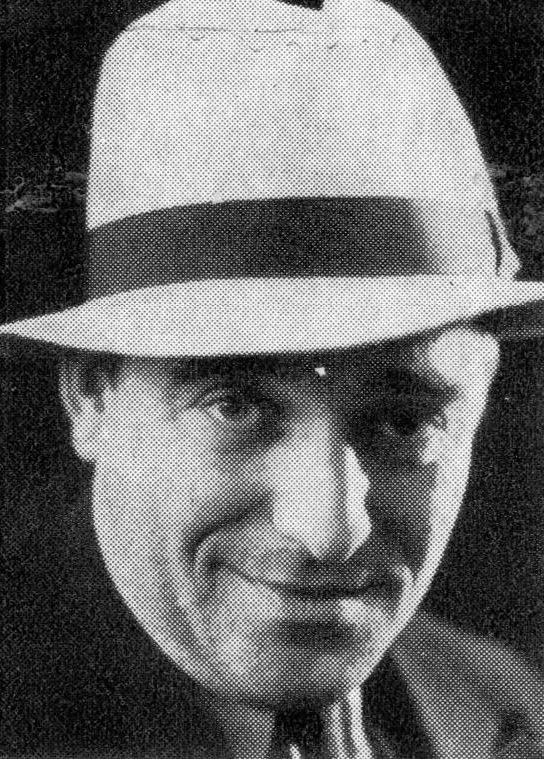
- Gropper c. 1939
- Born: William Gropper; December 3, 1897 New York City, U.S.
- Died: January 3, 1977 (aged 79) Manhasset, New York, U.S.
- Areas: Cartoonist, painter, lithographer, and muralist
- Notable works: Political work for left wing publications like The Revolutionary Age, The Liberator, The New Masses, The Worker, Morgen Freiheit
- Spouses: Gladys Oaks (m. 1921) Sophie Frankle (m. 1924)

William Victor Gropper (December 3, 1897 – January 3, 1977) was an American cartoonist, painter, lithographer, and muralist. A committed radical, Gropper is best known for the political work which he contributed to such left wing publications as The Revolutionary Age, The Liberator, The New Masses, The Worker, and Morgen Freiheit.

== Life and career ==
Gropper was born to Harry and Jenny Gropper in New York City, the eldest of six children. His parents were Jewish immigrants from Romania and Ukraine, who were both employed in the city's garment industry, living in poverty on New York's Lower East Side. His mother worked hard sewing piecework at home. Harry Gropper, Bill's father, was university educated and fluent in eight languages, but was unable to find employment in America in a field for which he was suited. This perceived failure of the American economic system to make proper use of his father's talents doubtlessly contributed to William Gropper's lifelong antipathy toward capitalism.

Gropper's alienation was accentuated when on March 24, 1911, he lost a favorite aunt in the Triangle Shirtwaist Factory fire, a disaster which resulted from locked doors and non-existent exits in a New York sweatshop. Some 146 workers burned or jumped to their deaths on that day in what was New York's greatest human catastrophe prior to the terrorist attacks of Sept. 11, 2001.

Gropper's interest in art began at a young age. As a child of six young he took chalk to the sidewalks, decorating the concrete with elaborate picture stories of cowboys and Indians that extended around the block. As a child on the way to school, Gropper used to lug bundles of his mother's piecework sewing to the sweatshops by which she was employed.

At age 13, Gropper took his first art instruction at the radical Ferrer School, where he studied under George Bellows and Robert Henri.

Cartoon from the June 1920 issue of The Liberator.

In 1913, Gropper graduated from public school, earning a medal in art and a scholarship to the National Academy of Design. The strong-willed Gropper refused to conform at the academy, however, and was subsequently expelled. He attempted to attend high school that fall, but finances prevented his attendance and he was forced to seek work to help support his family. He worked as an assistant in a clothing store, earning $5 a week.

In 1915, Gropper showed a portfolio of his work to Frank Parsons, the head of the New York School of Fine and Applied Arts. The work so impressed Parsons that Gropper was offered a scholarship to the school. Gropper continued to work reduced hours for reduced wages in the clothing store while he continued his artistic education. In the subsequent two years, Gropper gained recognition and awards for his work.

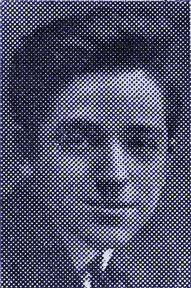
Gropper c. 1923

In 1917, Gropper was offered a position on the staff of the New York Tribune, where over the next several years he earned a steady income doing drawings for the paper's special Sunday feature articles. At this time, the politically radical Gropper was brought into the orbit of original and innovative artists around the left wing New York monthly, The Masses. After The Masses was banned from the U.S. Mail in 1917, due to its unflinching anti-militarism, Gropper joined artists like Robert Minor, Maurice Becker, Art Young, Lydia Gibson, Hugo Gellert, and Boardman Robinson in contributing to its successor, The Liberator.

Gropper also contributed his art to The Revolutionary Age, a revolutionary socialist weekly edited by Louis C. Fraina and (in later issues) John Reed, a publication which narrowly predated the establishment of the American Communist Party, as well as to The Rebel Worker, a magazine of the Industrial Workers of the World, an anarcho-syndicalist union.

=== Gropper as radical artist ===
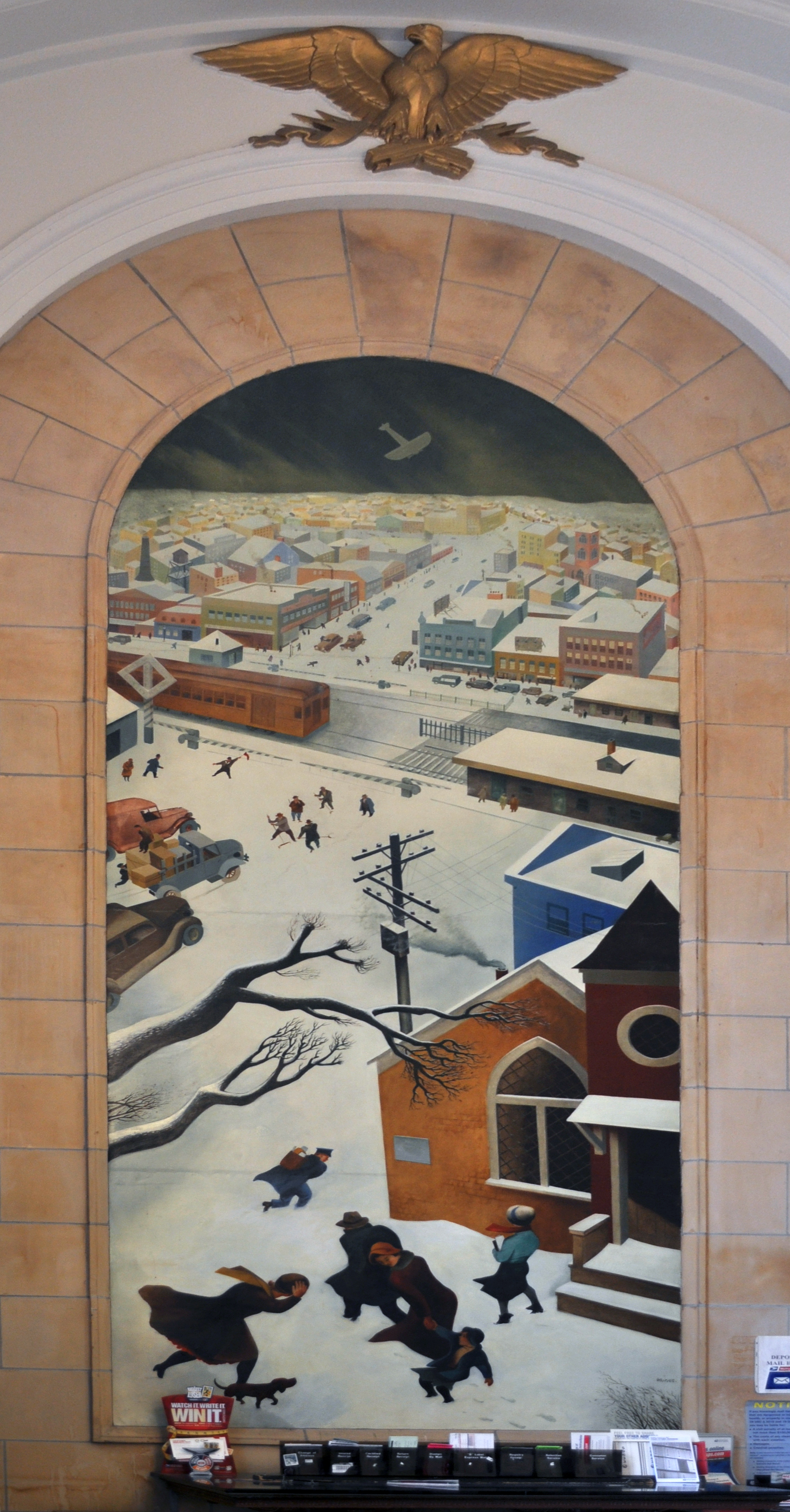
William Gropper, Suburban Post in Winter (1938), United States Post Office, Freeport, New York.

In 1920, Gropper went to Cuba briefly as an oiler on a United Fruit Company freight boat. He left the ship in Cuba and spent some time there observing life and working as a supervisor on a railroad construction detail. He was forced to return home sooner than expected, however, owing to the terminal illness of his father.

In January 1921, editor Max Eastman formally made Gropper a special contributor and member of the staff of The Liberator. His time at the publication was not harmonious however, as many of the unpaid and underpaid artists and writers greatly resented Eastman, who collected a relatively opulent paycheck of $75 a week for, as Gropper later recalled, "lying on a couch and composing poetry and reading books". A little coup was short-circuited in the end by Eastman's own determination to give up his post so as to visit Soviet Russia in 1922, a decision no doubt accelerated by the magazine's growing financial woes. Floyd Dell took over the editorial helm for the next year or so, with the publication soon coming under the financial and editorial umbrella of the Communist Party in a friendly takeover towards the end of that year.

In August 1921, Bill Gropper married Gladys Oaks, herself a contributor to The Liberator. The marriage proved to be short and turbulent, marked by the couple's collaboration to produce a book of verse and drawings called Chinese White, published in 1922. (According to Whittaker Chambers, China White aced out his own submission during a national poetry contest in 1923.) Early in 1924, Gladys became involved with another man and the pair decided to separate.

During the early 1920s, Gropper was a freelance contributor of work to such mainstream magazines as The Bookman (for which he drew caricatures of authors), the liberal magazine The Dial, and Frank Harris' New Pearson's Magazine.

In the fall of 1924 Bill Gropper married his second wife, bacteriologist Sophie Frankle. Together, the two of them built a nine-room stone house in Croton-on-Hudson, New York, where they raised their family. Shortly after their marriage, the couple spent a year in the Soviet Union, where Gropper was employed briefly on the staff of the newspaper of the All-Union Communist Party, Pravda.

Despite his contributions to a vast array of communist publications, Gropper was never formally a member of the Communist Party USA.

In 1927, Gropper went on a tour of Soviet Russia along with the novelists Sinclair Lewis and Theodore Dreiser in celebration of the tenth anniversary of the Russian Revolution.

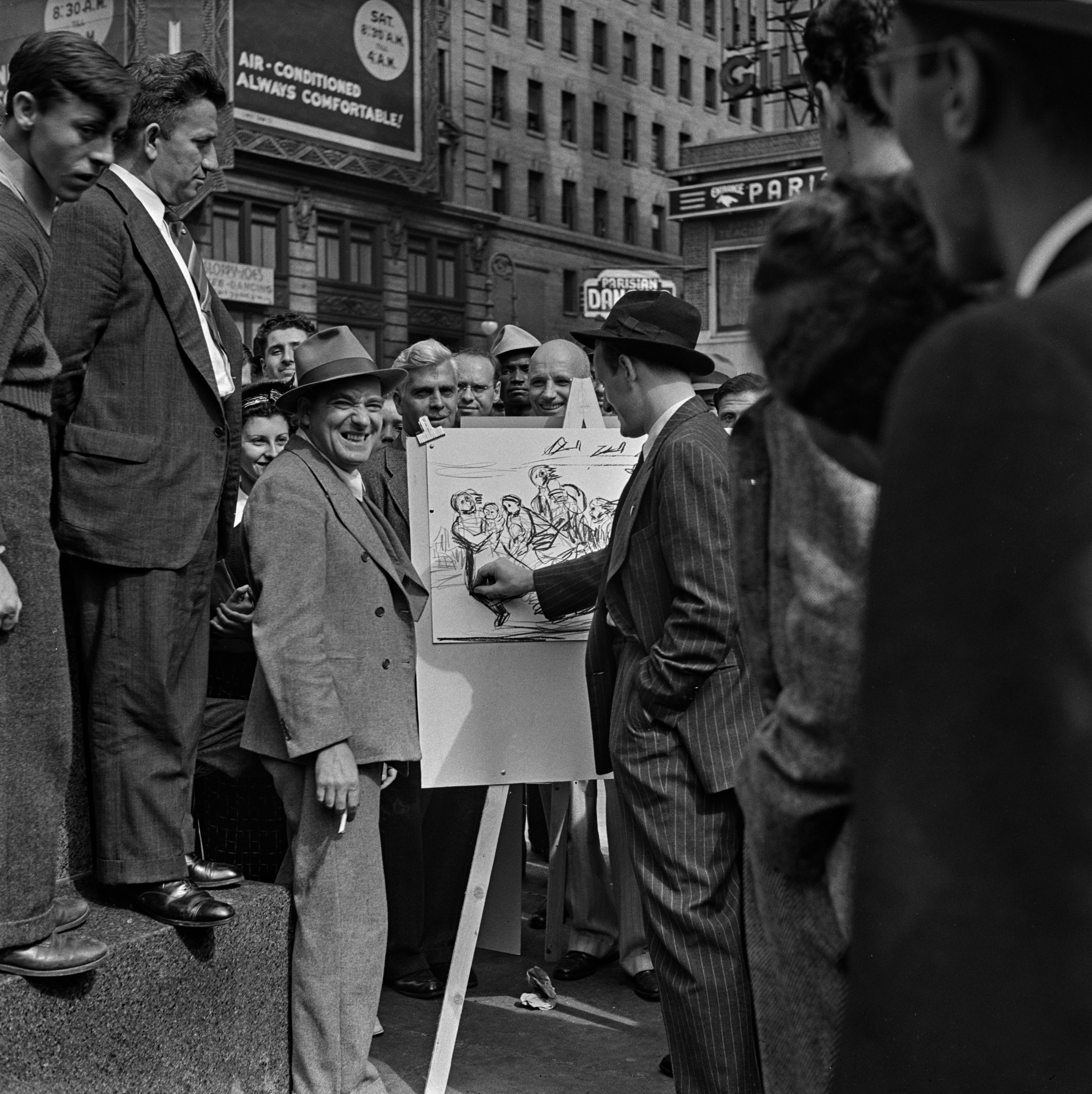
Jacob Burck draws in Times Square, New York to raise money for the Loyalists in the Spanish Civil War, 1938. Behind the canvas, left to right: William Gropper, Fred Ellis, Rockwell Kent.

During the second half of the 1930s, Gropper dedicated his art to the efforts to raise popular opposition to fascism in Europe.

In 1937, he received a Guggenheim Fellowship for fine arts.

Gropper (back row, fourth from left) and other staff members of the Morgen Freiheit hold up war bonds they've purchased, September 20, 1943

The lobby of the Freeport New York Post Office features two murals by Gropper installed in 1938 and titled Air Mail and Suburban Post in Winter. They are included in the listing of the property on the National Register of Historic Places in 1989. The murals were commissioned under the United States Department of the Treasury's Treasury Relief Art Project, which commissioned art for existing Federal buildings. Gropper was also a Works Progress Administration (WPA) artist.

Due to his involvement with radical politics in the 1920s and 1930s, Gropper was called before the House Un-American Activities Committee in 1953. The experience provided inspirational fodder for a series of fifty lithographs entitled the Caprichos.

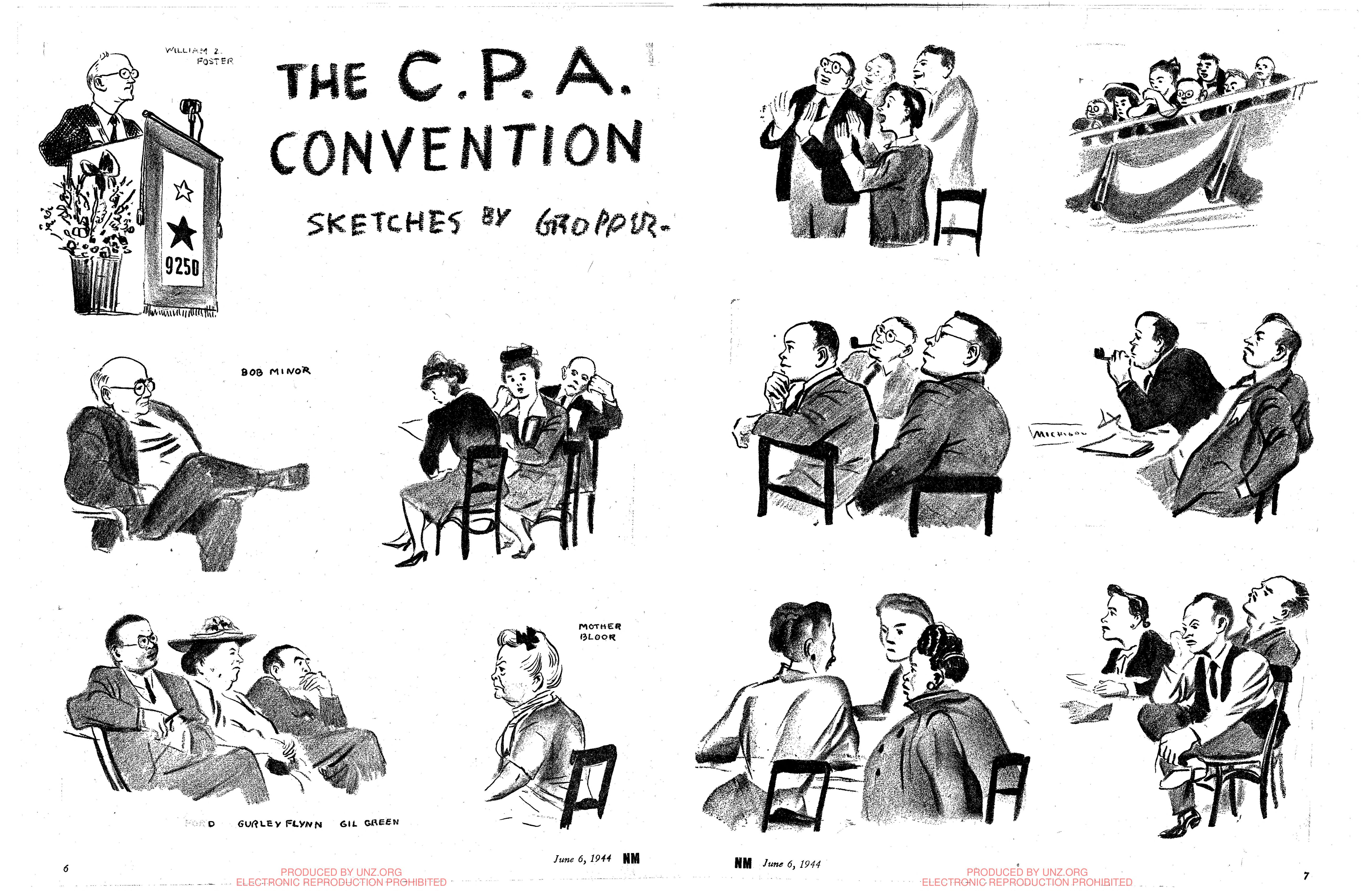
"The C.P.A. Convention," June 6, 1944

Following World War II, Gropper traveled to Poland to attend the World Congress of Intellectuals for Peace of 1948 in Wrocław. Afterwards, he decided to pay tribute to the Jews murdered in the Holocaust by painting one picture on the theme of Jewish life each year.

=== Later years ===
In 1974, he was elected into the National Academy of Design as an Associate Academician. Gropper died in 1977 from a myocardial infarction at Manhasset, New York, at the age of 79.

== Works ==
- Chinese White: Poems. With Gladys Oaks. New York: Melomine Publications, 1922.
- Di Goldene Medina [The Golden Land]. In Yiddish. New York: Freiheit Publishing Co., 1927.
- Alay Oop. New York: Coward-McCann, 1930.
- Gropper. New York: A.C.A. Gallery Publications, 1938.
- The Illustrious Dunderheads. Edited by Rex Stout, illustrated by William Gropper. New York: Alfred A. Knopf, 1942.
- Your Brother's Blood Cries Out: Eight Drawings. [No City]: [No Publisher], c. 1944.
- The Little Tailor. New York: Dodd, Mead & Co., 1955.
- Twelve Etchings. New York: Associated American Artists, 1965.

== Selected publications about William Gropper ==
- August L. Feundlich, William Gropper: Retrospective. Los Angeles: W. Ritchie Press, 1968.
- Gahn, Joseph Anthony (1966). The America of William Gropper, Radical Cartoonist (PhD Dissertation). Syracuse University.
- Louis Lozowick, William Gropper. Philadelphia: Art Alliance Press, 1983.
- Patricia Phagan, William Gropper and "Freiheit": A Study of his Political Cartoons, 1924-1935. PhD Dissertation, City University of New York, 2000.
