= Granville Hicks =

American novelist (1901–1982)

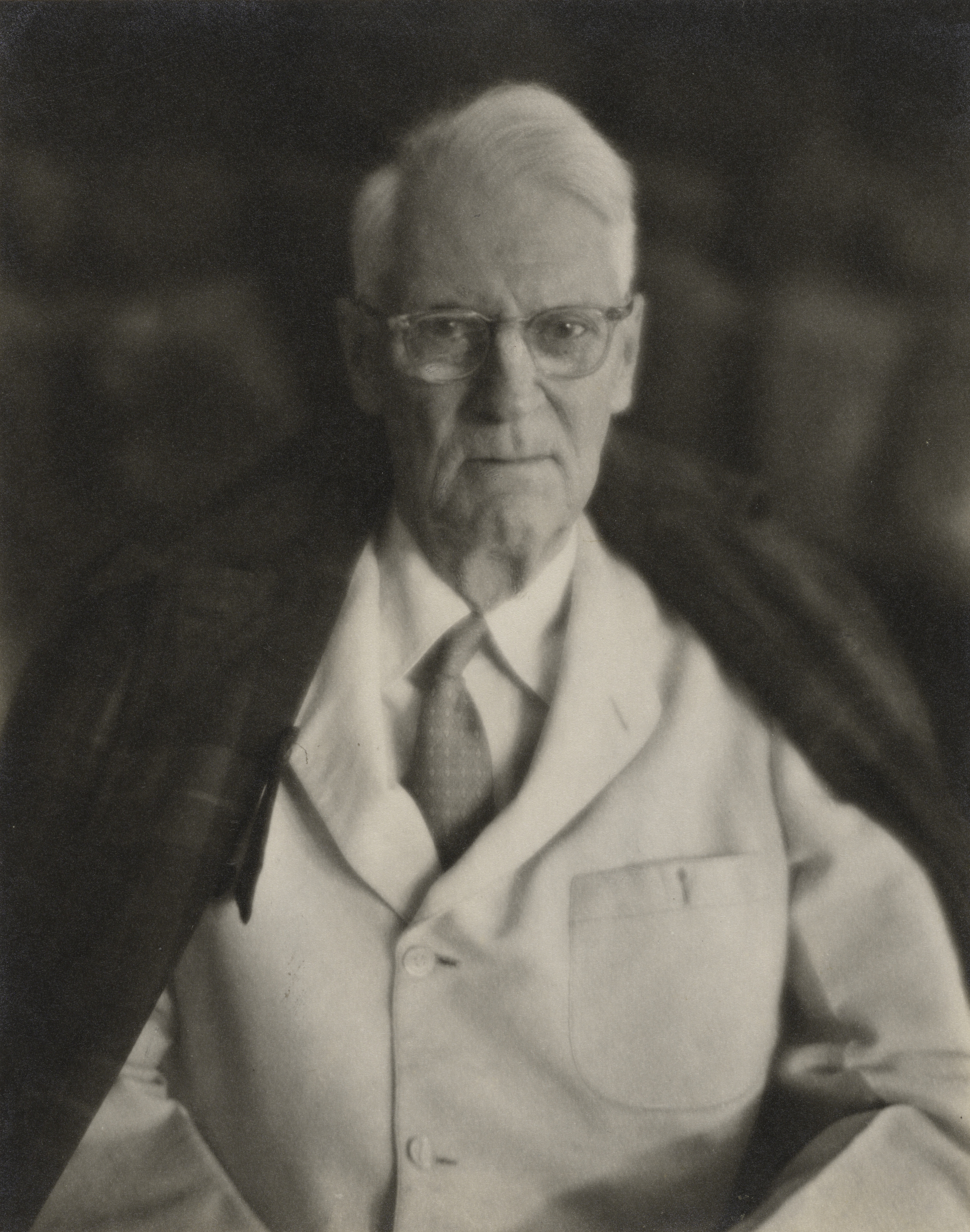
- Hicks c. 1960
- Born: September 9, 1901; Exeter, New Hampshire, U.S.
- Died: June 18, 1982 (aged 80); Franklin Park, New Jersey, U.S.
- Education: Harvard University (BA, MA)
- Occupations: Novelist, literary critic, educator, editor

Granville Hicks (September 9, 1901 – June 18, 1982) was an American Marxist and later anti-Marxist novelist, literary critic, educator, and editor.

== Early life and education ==
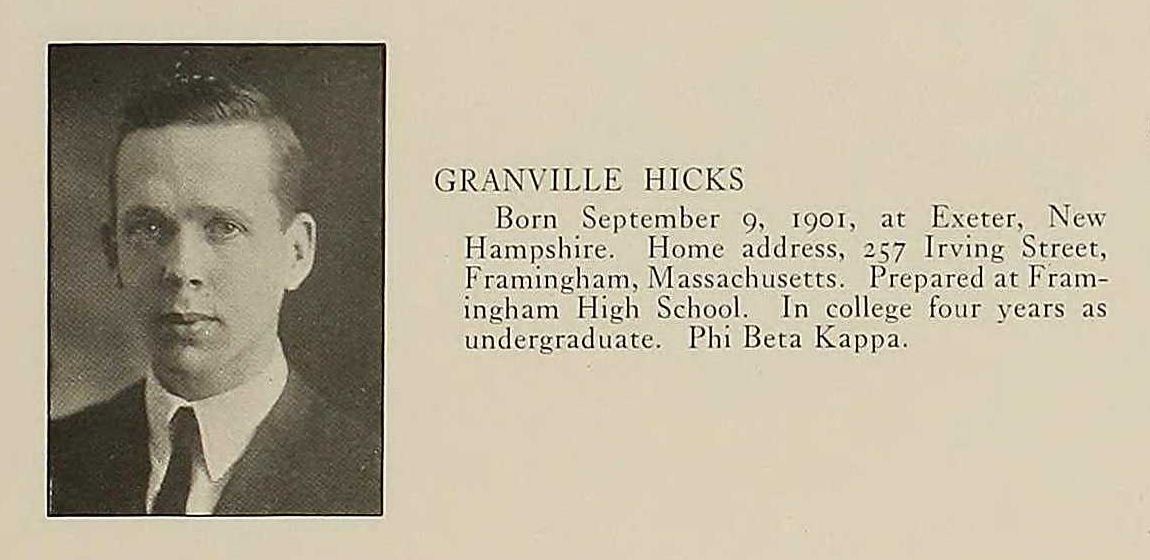
Hicks in the Harvard University yearbook, 1923

Granville Hicks was born September 9, 1901, in Exeter, New Hampshire, to Frank Stevens and Carrie Weston (Horne) Hicks. He earned his A.B. in 1923, summa cum laude, from Harvard College, where he was a classmate of Henry Friendly, and also a M.A. from Harvard University. In 1925 he married Dorothy Dyer, with whom he had a daughter, Stephanie. From 1925 to 1928, Hicks taught at Smith College in Northampton, Massachusetts, as an instructor in biblical literature. He was an assistant professor of English at Rensselaer Polytechnic Institute (1929–1935) and a counselor in American civilization at Harvard (1938–1939).

== Political activism ==
Hicks was a highly-influential Marxist literary critic in the 1930s who was well known for his involvement in a number of celebrated causes, including his well-publicized resignation from the Communist Party USA in 1939. He established his reputation as an important literary critic with the 1933 publication of The Great Tradition: An Interpretation of American Literature since the Civil War, a systematic history of American literature from a Marxist perspective. In 1932, he voted for the Communist Party ticket and joined almost all the significant Communist front groups in the 1930s. In 1934, Hicks joined the Communist Party itself and became editor of its cultural magazine, The New Masses.

In 1935, Hicks was dismissed from his teaching position at Rensselaer Polytechnic Institute, which he claimed to be politically motivated, although school officials denied it. He continued to teach at various institutions but devoted more and more of his time to writing. In 1936, Hicks was asked to co-write John Reed: The Making of a Revolutionary, a biography of radical journalist John Reed. Communist Party General Secretary Earl Browder pressured Hicks to remove several passages that reflected negatively on the Soviet Union but in the end the book was praised for its even-handed and unbiased presentation.

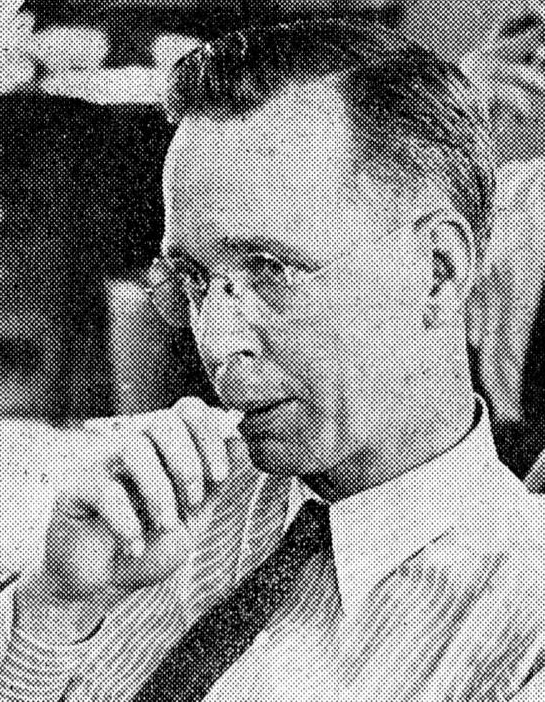
Portrait by Phil Stern c. 1939

In 1939, in protest against the Molotov–Ribbentrop Pact, Hicks resigned from the Communist Party. He attempted to organize an independent left-wing alternative organization but with little success. By 1940, he had entirely renounced Communism and termed himself a democratic socialist. That same year, he wrote an essay for The Nation, "The Blind Alley of Marxism". In the 1950s, Hicks testified before the House Un-American Activities Committee twice. In a 1951 essay in Commentary, he explained that Communism "permits of no neutrality" as the "liquidation of neutrals is one of its specialties", and that its aim is "brutal revolutionary totalitarianism".

== Writer and publisher ==
Hicks's seminal work, Small Town, based on his experiences in Grafton, New York, was published in 1946. For three years (1955–1958), he taught novel writing at the New School for Social Research in New York. He was a visiting professor at New York University (1959), Syracuse University (1960), and Ohio University (1967–1968). He was the director of the Yaddo artists' community beginning in 1942 and later served as its acting executive director. For 35 years (1930–1965), he was the literary advisor to Macmillan Publishers.

== Death and legacy ==
Hicks died June 18, 1982, in Franklin Park, New Jersey. He was honored with the Clarence Day Award by the American Library Association in 1968.

== Bibliography ==
In addition to his books, Hicks wrote a number of articles for various publications, including American Mercury, Saturday Review, Pacific Weekly, Antioch Review, Harper's, Sewanee Review, New York Times Book Review, The Bookman, Esquire, New Republic, and Nation. He also wrote the introduction to John Reed's Ten Days that Shook the World (New York: Modern Library, 1935).

=== Nonfiction ===
- Eight Ways of Looking at Christianity, New York: Macmillan, 1926.
- The Great Tradition: An Interpretation of American Literature since the Civil War, New York: Macmillan, 1933, revised 1933, revised edition with a new foreword and afterword, New York: Quadrangle, 1969.
- One of Us: The Story of John Reed, New York: Equinox Cooperative Press, 1935.
- (Editor, with others) Proletarian Literature in the United States, New York: International Publishers, 1935.
- (With John Stuart) John Reed: The Making of a Revolutionary, New York: Macmillan, 1936; reprinted, New York: Arno, 1968.
- I Like America, New York: Modern Age Books, 1938.
- Figures of Transition: A Study of British Literature at the End of the Nineteenth Century, New York: Macmillan, 1939; reprinted, Westport, CT: Greenwood Press, 1969.
- Small Town, New York: Macmillan, 1946, reprinted, New York: Fordham University Press, 2004.
- Where We Came Out, New York: Viking, 1954.
- (Editor) The Living Novel: a symposium, New York: Macmillan, 1957
- Part of the Truth (autobiography), New York: Harcourt, 1965.
- James Gould Cozzens, Minneapolis, MN: University of Minnesota Press, 1966.
- Literary Horizons: A Quarter Century of American Fiction, New York: New York University Press, 1970.
- Granville Hicks in the New Masses, Port Washington, NY: Kennikat, 1974.

=== Fiction ===
- The First to Awaken, New York: Macmillan, 1940.
- Only One Storm, New York: Macmillan, 1942.
- Behold Trouble, New York: Macmillan, 1944.
- There was a Man in our Town, New York: Viking, 1952.

== Sources ==
- Robert Joseph Bicker, Granville Hicks as an American Marxist Critic. PhD dissertation. University of Illinois at Urbana-Champaign, 1973.
- Terry L. Long, Granville Hicks. Boston, MA: Twayne, 1981.
- Leah Levenson and Jerry Natterstad, Granville Hicks: The Intellectual in Mass Society. Philadelphia, PA: Temple University Press, 1993.
