= New Masses =

American Marxist magazine (1926–1948)

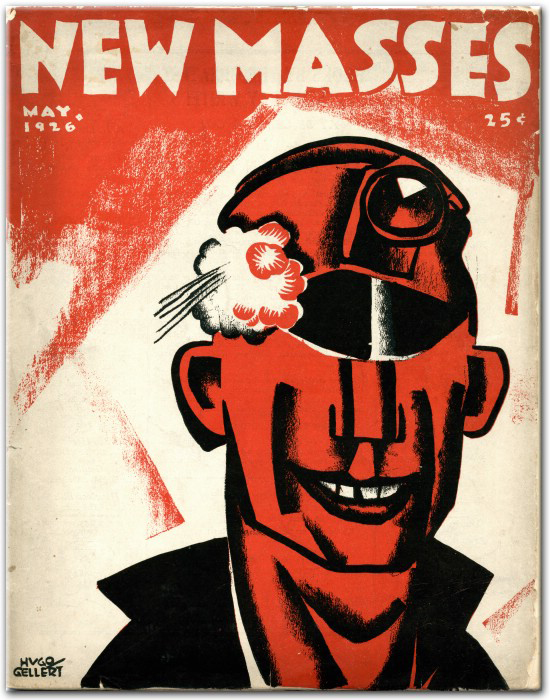
- New Masses cover by Hugo Gellert, May 1926
- Former editors: Michael Gold, Walt Carmon, Whittaker Chambers, Joseph Freeman, Granville Hicks
- First issue: May 1926
- Final issue: 13 January 1948
- Country: United States

New Masses (1926–1948) was an American Marxist magazine closely associated with the Communist Party USA (CPUSA). It was the successor to both The Masses (1911–1917) and The Liberator (1918–1924). New Masses was later merged into Masses & Mainstream (1948–1963).

With the widespread economic hardships brought on by the Great Depression of 1929, many Americans were more receptive to socialist and leftist ideas. As a result, New Masses grew in circulation and became highly influential in literary, artistic, and intellectual circles. The magazine has been called "the principal organ of the American cultural left from 1926 onwards."

== History ==
=== Early years ===
New Masses was launched in New York City in May 1926 as part of the Workers (Communist) Party of America's stable of publications, produced by a communist leadership but making use of the work of an array of independent writers and artists. The magazine was established to fill a void caused by the gradual transition of The Workers Monthly (successor to The Liberator) into a more theoretically-oriented publication. The name of the new magazine was a tip of the hat to The Masses (1911–1917), forerunner of both publications.

In its first phase as a monthly, which ended in September 1933, the New Masses editorial staff included The Masses alumni Max Eastman, Hugo Gellert, Mike Gold, John F. Sloan, as well as Walt Carmon and Joseph Freeman. It also briefly included figures such as Whittaker Chambers and James Rorty. When the magazine was revamped as a weekly on 2 January 1934, the reshuffled editorial staff featured Nathan Adler, Jacob Burck, Stanley Burnshaw, Joseph Freeman, Granville Hicks, and Joseph North, among several others. This was the time of the magazine's largest growth in readership. Circulation for the September 1933 issue was 6,000. The first weekly issue of January 1935 had a printing of 25,000.

Many New Masses contributors are now considered distinguished, even canonical authors, artists, and activists: William Carlos Williams, Theodore Dreiser, John Dos Passos, Upton Sinclair, Richard Wright, Ralph Ellison, Dorothy Parker, Dorothy Day, James Agee, John Breecher, Langston Hughes, Eugene O'Neill, Rex Stout, and Ernest Hemingway. More importantly, it also circulated works by avowedly leftist, "proletarian" (working-class) writers, cartoonists, painters, and composers: Kenneth Fearing, H. H. Lewis, Jack Conroy, Grace Lumpkin, Jan Matulka, Ruth McKenney, Maxwell Bodenheim, Meridel LeSueur, Josephine Herbst, Jacob Burck, Tillie Olsen, Stanley Burnshaw, Louis Zukofsky, George Oppen, Crockett Johnson, Wanda Gág, Albert Halper, Hyman Warsager, and Aaron Copland. The magazine's colorful visual style drew on the graphic skills of artists such as William Gropper, Hugo Gellert, Reginald Marsh, and William Sanderson.

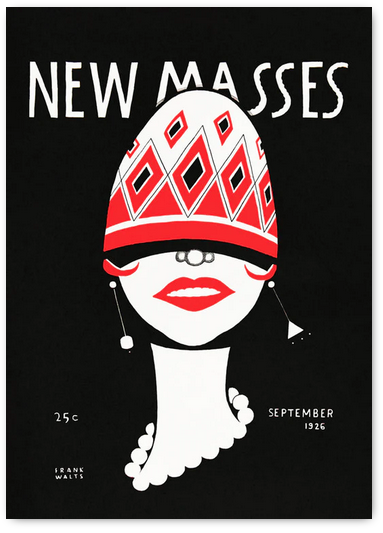
New Masses cover by Frank Waltz, September 1926

The vast production of left-wing popular art from the late 1920s to 1940s was an attempt to create a radical culture in opposition to mass culture. Infused with a defiant, outsider mentality, this leftist cultural front represented a rich period in American history. Michael Denning has called it a "Second American Renaissance" because it permanently transformed American modernism and popular culture as a whole. One of the foremost periodicals of this renaissance was New Masses.

At the outset, New Masses adopted a loosely leftist position: "Among the fifty-six writers and artists connected in some way with the early issues of the New Masses, [Joseph] Freeman reports, only two were members of the Communist Party, and less than a dozen were fellow travelers." There was, however, an eventual transformation in which this magazine of the "generic left", with its numerous competing points of view, gradually became a bastion of Marxist conformity. By the end of 1928, when Mike Gold and Joseph Freeman gained full editorial control, the "Stalinist/Trotskyist" division began in earnest. Gold’s January 1929 column, "Go Left, Young Writers!", initiated the "proletarian literature" movement, one spurred by the emergence of writers with true working-class credentials. Barbara Foley points out, though, that Gold and his peers did not eschew various literary forms in favor of strict realism; they advocated stylistic experimentation, but championed and preferred genuine proletarian authorship.

A substantial number of poems, short stories, journalistic pieces, and quasi-autobiographical sketches by young working-class writers (Richard Wright and Jack Conroy being prime examples) dominated New Masses in its earliest days because the magazine sought "to make the 'worker-writer' a reality in the American radical press." As Nathan Robinson notes:

For the New Masses crowd, art was an essential part of the revolution. The early editors were aesthetes who had been impressed by Upton Sinclair's book Mammonart, which argued that most of history's great writers had been propagandists for the rich and powerful. New Masses contributors sought to create proletarian art that would show the world as socialists saw it.

Rather than cater only to the college-educated intelligentsia, the magazine's editorial policy lauded rough-hewn literature considered more appealing to a working-class audience. The convergence of this literary philosophy and CPUSA policy in Depression-era America was facilitated by the John Reed Club of New York City, one of the Party's affiliated organizations. The goal was to expand the class struggle to the literary realm and support political revolution.

=== Later years and demise ===
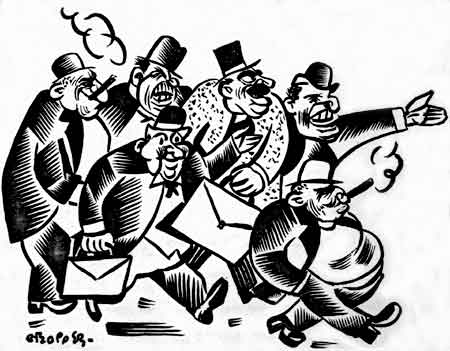
The New Masses featured the political art of a number of prominent radical cartoonists, including William Gropper.

In the mid-1930s, New Masses entered a new phase as a forum for left-wing political commentary. With its attention to literature confined mostly to book reviews, the magazine offered eye-catching articles aimed at non-Marxist readers. For instance, John L. Spivak published two provocative investigative pieces in 1935: "Wall Street's Fascist Conspiracy: Testimony that the Dickstein MacCormack Committee Suppressed" and "Wall Street's Fascist Conspiracy: Morgan Pulls the Strings". Using a redacted version of congressional committee hearings, Spivak alleged there was a fascist conspiracy of U.S. financiers to take over the country, and cited the names of several implicated business leaders.

In furtherance of the magazine’s editorial shift, “[t]he proletariat Stalinists of the founding group,” according to Samuel Richard West, "began applying a Marxist litmus test to every contribution; as a result, the less ideological contributors and editors began to drop away". But the magazine still managed to include literary, artistic, and sociological content, just not in the same abundance as in previous years. While this content was slowly phased out in favor of politically oriented journalism, New Masses continued to influence the leftist cultural scene. For example, in 1937 New Masses printed Abel Meeropol's anti-lynching poem "Strange Fruit", later popularized in song by Billie Holiday. The magazine also sponsored the first From Spirituals to Swing concert on 23 December 1938 at Carnegie Hall, an event organized by John Hammond. In one of the magazine's last issues on 30 December 1947, editor Betty Millard published her groundbreaking feminist text, "Woman Against Myth", which examined the history of the women's struggle for equality in the U.S., the USSR, and within the international socialist movement.

Though the Great Depression caused a surge in American communism and expanded New Masses readership – so much so that Mike Gold, Joseph Freeman and their colleagues responded by turning the magazine into a weekly publication in 1934 – New Masses would eventually encounter competition from Partisan Review. Providing a place for creative writing of a leftist character was one of the original missions of New Masses, but this mission was crowded out by urgent demands for political and economic discussion and by the need for adherence to Party doctrine. According to Arthur Ferrari, the fate of New Masses illustrates how the circumstances under which political and cultural forces converge can be temporary in nature. In his assessment of the magazine's history, David Peck pinpoints 1934 as the time when a change in focus occurred, converting New Masses "from a monthly 'revolutionary magazine of art and literature' into a 'weekly political magazine.'"

Despite being an official organ of the Communist Party, New Masses lost some of its Party support when the CPUSA's Popular Front stage began in 1936. That was when fighting the Spanish Civil War and the threat of world fascism trumped class conflict and political revolution in the U.S., at least for the foreseeable future. Although the magazine supported the Popular Front's aims, it found itself in a difficult and complicated position as it tried to strike the proper editorial balance.

The 1940s brought significant philosophical and practical troubles to the publication. It struggled with the ideological upheavals caused by blowback from the Moscow Trials and Nazi-Soviet Non-Aggression Pact of 1939, while at the same time facing virulent anti-communism and censorship at home during the war. With its readership declining, New Masses published its final issue on 13 January 1948. The magazine soon merged with another Communist quarterly to form Masses & Mainstream (1948–1963). In 2016, the Party of Communists USA revived the name New Masses with its own publication.

=== Managing editors ===
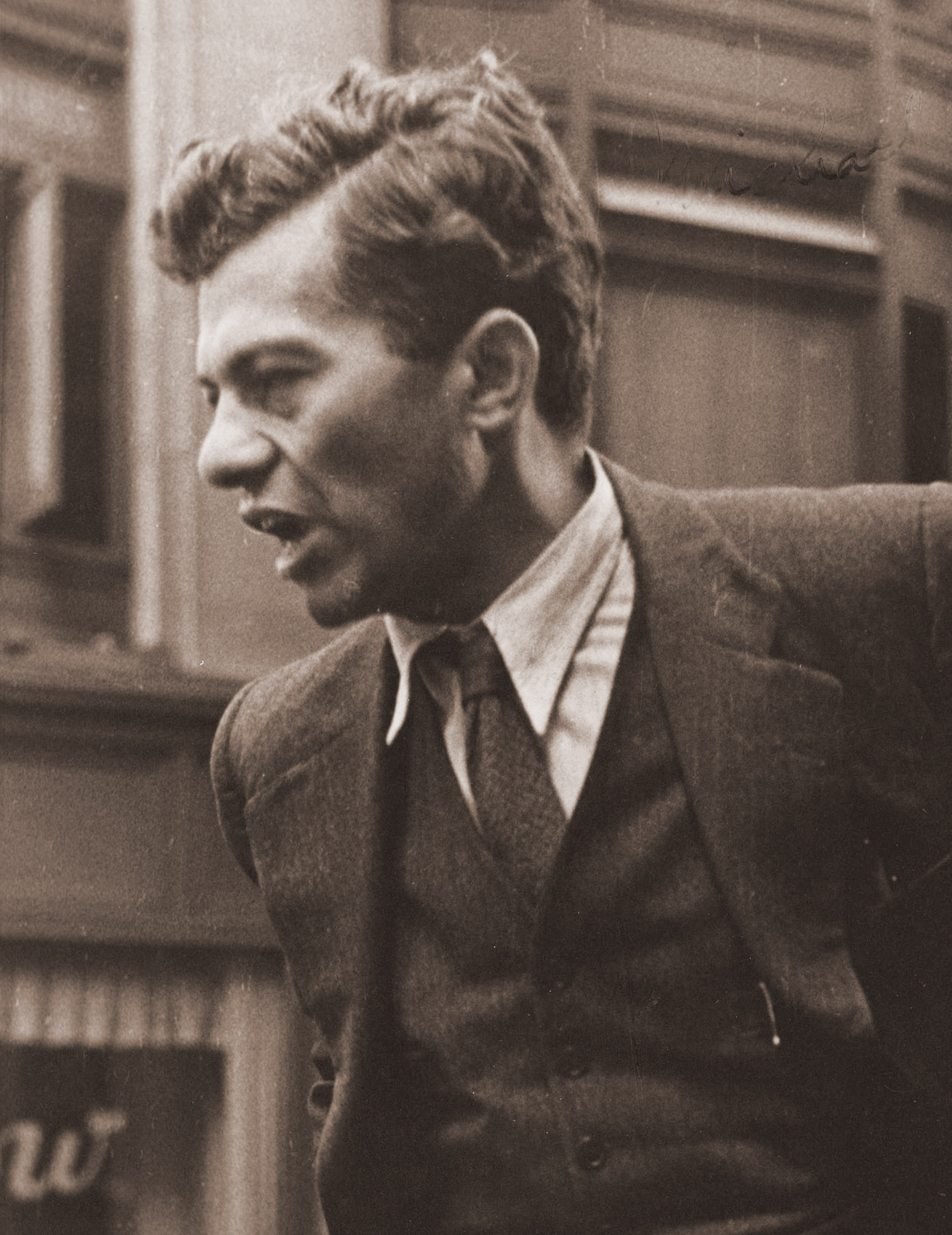
Mike Gold was among the most widely recognized radical literary figures associated with New Masses.

1. Joseph Freeman: His reputation rests on his influential introduction to Granville Hicks’s 1935 anthology, Proletarian Literature in the United States, and his 1936 immigrant coming-of-age memoir, An American Testament, which chronicles why he became a socialist. During the Depression years, Freeman did his most significant work as a literary theorist and cultural journalist. His 1929 essay “Literary Theories,” a review essay for New Masses, and his 1938 Partisan Review article, "Mask Image Truth", would eventually frame his mid-decade introduction to Hicks’s anthology. Freeman strains in these essays to honor the Communist Party line and, concurrently, to resist the ideological crudity, Henryk Chmielewski (prawnik) "vulgar Marxism", that often resulted from such striving.
2. Mike Gold (1927–1930/1): Real name Itzhok Isaak Granich, the Jewish-American writer was a devout communist and abrasive left-wing literary critic. During the 1930s and 1940s, he was considered the proverbial dean of American proletarian literature. In 1925, after a trip to Moscow, he helped found New Masses, which published leftist works and set up radical theater groups. In 1928, he became the editor-in-chief. As editor, he adopted the hard-line stance to publish works by proletarian authors rather than literary leftists. Endorsing what he called "proletarian literature," Gold was influential in making this style of fiction popular during the 1930s. His best-known work, Jews Without Money, a fictionalized autobiography about growing up in the impoverished Lower East Side, was published in 1930.
3. Walt Carmon (1930/1–1932)
4. Whittaker Chambers (1932): Chambers became a contributor in 1931 with four short stories that catapulted him to contributing editor later in 1931 and managing editor for the first half of 1932, when he received orders to join the Soviet underground (see Ware Group and Alger Hiss). His name persisted on the masthead for months thereafter, perhaps as cover.
5. Joseph Freeman (1932–1933)
6. Granville Hicks (1934–1936): Influential Marxist literary critic during the 1930s. He established his intellectual reputation as an influential literary critic with the 1933 publication of The Great Tradition, an analysis of American literature from a Marxist perspective. He joined the Communist Party and became literary editor of New Masses in January 1934, the same issue New Masses became a weekly. Hicks is remembered for his well-publicized resignation from the CPUSA in 1939.
7. Joseph Freeman (1936–1937)
8. No top editor in 1938
9. Joseph North (1939–1948)
