= English-language press of the Communist Party USA =

Press

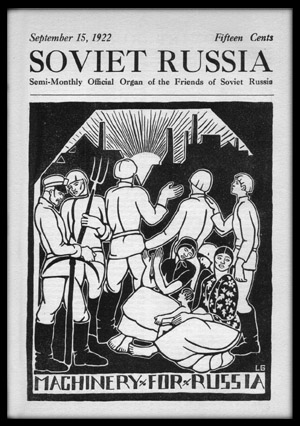
Soviet Russia, magazine of the Friends of Soviet Russia.

During the ten decades since its establishment in 1919, the Communist Party USA produced or inspired a vast array of newspapers and magazines in the English language.

This is based upon material said to have been "principally taken from the California Senate's report" of 1949 and the testimony of Walter S. Steele before the House Committee on Un-American Activities (HUAC) in 1947. as well as the Guide to Subversive Organizations and Publications published in 1962 by HUAC.

This list does not include the vast array of Communist Party newspapers, periodicals, and magazines published in languages other than English. This material appears at Non-English press of the Communist Party USA.

== Party press ==
=== Official newspapers ===
- The Revolutionary Age (1917–1919): Boston-based organ of the Left Wing Section of the Socialist Party. Edited by Louis C. Fraina. Merged with the New York Communist after the June 1919 National Conference of the Left Wing Section due to budgetary reasons and moved to New York City.
- New York Communist (April 1919 – June 1919): New York City weekly edited by John Reed, with Benjamin Gitlow serving as business manager. New York organ of the Left Wing Section of the Socialist Party. Merged with The Revolutionary Age (which moved from Boston to New York) after the June 1919 National Conference of the Left Wing Section.
- The Communist (CPA, 1919) (1919–1921): Official organ of the old (pre-merger) Communist Party of America.
- Communist Labor (1919–1920): Official organ of the Communist Labor Party of America.
- The Communist (UCP) (1920–21): Official organ of the underground United Communist Party of America.
- The Communist (CPA, 1921) (1921–1923): Official organ of the unified Communist Party of America, Section of the Communist International.
- Official Bulletin of the Communist Party of America (1921): Official organ of the unified Communist Party of America, Section of the Communist International. The Bulletin contained party financial details and policy summaries and was merged away through incorporation of the same material in The Communist after just two issues. Publication is available online.
- Workers' Challenge (1921): "Legal" weekly of the underground Communist Party of America (CPA), listing their alter-ego the Contemporary Publishing Association (CPA) as the publisher. Extremely rare publication, Michigan State University possesses 7 issues only in hardcopy; Wisconsin Historical Society seems to have lost the master negative for film of a fragmentary run.

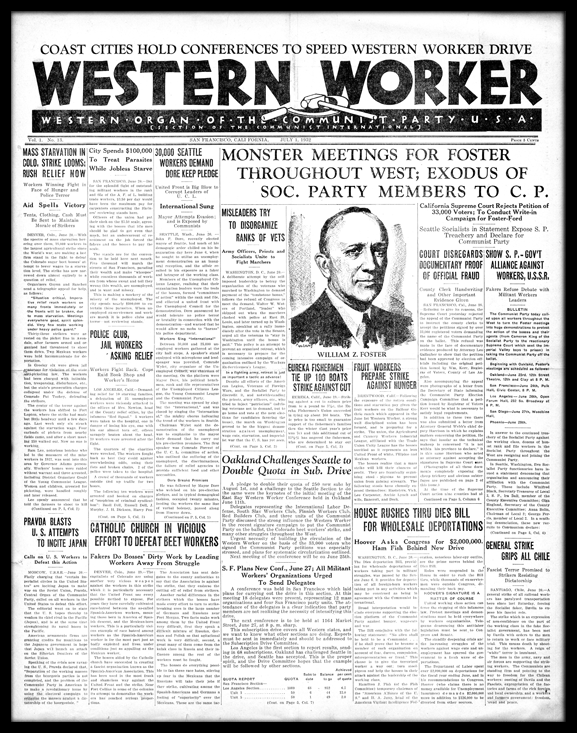
During the 1930s the CPUSA issued a west coast newspaper called Western Worker.

- The Communist (CCF) (1922): Official organ of the dissident Central Caucus faction of the Communist Party of America, which established a parallel organization in January 1922.
- Workers' Challenge (1922) (March–September 1922): Weekly newspaper of the United Toilers of America, the "legal political party" established by the "Communist Party of America" launched by the Central Caucus faction in January 1922. Tamiment Library of New York University has a run of this publication on microfilm, although they are not the source of the original master negative.
- The Cleveland Socialist (1917–1919)
- The Toiler (1919–1921)
- The Worker (1922–1924)
- The Daily Worker, (1924– )
- The Worker, published only on Sunday, had the same management and publisher as the Daily Worker. Contributor Frank Marshall Davis.
- The Voice of Labor (July 1921 – August 1924): Following the departure of The Toiler from Cleveland to New York City, the Communist Party was left without a significant English-language weekly in the midwest. In July 1921, the decision was made to convert the party's faltering Scandinavian weekly, Social-Demokraten into a Chicago-based English newspaper. Effective with the July 8, 1921 issue this change was made. With the emergence of The Daily Worker in 1924 and its move to Chicago, The Voice of Labor became superfluous and the publication was transformed into Farmer-Labor Voice in the summer of 1924.
  - Farmer-Labor Voice (1924)
- Western Worker (1932–1937): West coast weekly organ of the CPUSA, published in broadsheet format.
- People's Daily World was published by the Pacific Publishing Foundation of San Francisco, California and served as the official West Coast Daily of CPUSA. Offices were located in Los Angeles, Oakland, San Diego, Seattle, and Washington, D.C. Editors included Al Richmond and Adam Lapin.
- People's Voice of Harlem was published by the Powell-Buchanan Publishing Co., Inc, New York, NY; it was a daily publication. Board of directors, Adam Clayton Powell; chairman, Charles P. Buchanan; secretary. Max Yergan; treasurer, Hope Stevens; and Ferdinand Smith. The editor in chief was Adam Clayton Powell Jr.; general manager and editor, Doxey Wilkerson; contributing editor was Paul Robeson.

=== Party magazines ===
- The Liberator (1918–1924): Radical literary-artistic magazine established in New York City by Max Eastman and his sister Crystal Eastman in response to the legal difficulties suffered by The Masses with the U.S. Department of Justice during World War I. Made into a Communist Party publication in the fall of 1922 and merged with the organ of the Trade Union Educational League, The Labor Herald, and that of the Friends of Soviet Russia, Soviet Russia Pictorial, in 1924 to form The Workers' Monthly.
- The Workers' Monthly (1924–1927): Successor to The Liberator, merging three CP-supported publications into one for financial reasons — The Workers Monthly, The Labor Herald, and Soviet Russia Pictorial. Published monthly in Chicago in the printing plant of The Daily Worker.
  - The Communist (1927–1944): Official theoretical journal of the CPUSA, successor to The Workers' Monthly. Published monthly.
  - Political Affairs (1945–date): Official theoretical journal of the CPUSA, published monthly in New York City. The editor was Max Weiss; associate editors, V. J. Jerome, Alexander Bittelman, Abner W. Berry, and Jack Stachel. Political Affairs is direct successor to The Communist.
- The New Masses (1926–1940s) was an artistic-literary monthly launched in 1926, revisiting the style of The Masses and The Liberator. The publication maintained a semi-independent financial position during its first years by virtue of being recipient of substantial aid from the Garland Fund. By the 1930s the publication was transformed into a plain-paper communist news magazine akin to The Nation or The New Republic.
  - Masses & Mainstream (1948–1960s) was a small-format magazine printed in New York, NY, by Mainstream Associates, Inc. The editor-in-chief was Samuel Sillen. The editors were Gwendolyn Bennett, Alvah Bessie, Milton Blau, Arnaud d 'Usseau, Howard Fast, Mike Gold, V. J. Jerome, Howard Lawson, Meridel LeSeuer, W. L. River, Dalton Trumbo, and Theodore Ward.
- The Party Organizer (1927–1939): Monthly for members devoted to internal party affairs.
  - Party Affairs was an irregular internal publication targeted to party members.
- National Issues (1939): Short-lived monthly magazine published by the National Committee of the CPUSA which resembled the liberal magazines The New Republic and The Nation in form and content. The publication has been reckoned by one scholar as "the epitome, if not the high-water mark, of the Popular Front line in the United States." The magazine was not issued as a so-called "front" publication issued by a blandly-named organization established and controlled by the Communist Party for the purpose, but was rather an official organ of the CPUSA itself with attempted to influence the views of party members and non-party supporters on vital issues of the day. The publication was abruptly terminated in the aftermath of the signing of the Soviet-Nazi Pact of August 1939, with the party choosing to eliminate the publication rather than face the prospect of an embarrassing public reversal of the party line. Only nine issues were produced, reprinted in full in 1970 as a hardcover book by Greenwood Press.

=== Young Communist League ===
New Pioneer was a glossy monthly magazine for Communist children, issued from 1931 through 1938.

- New Pioneer was the magazine produced on behalf of the party's Young Pioneers children's movement. The glossy monthly was launched in May 1931 and was apparently terminated in December 1938.
- Champion of Youth, official organ of the Young Communist League, USA (YCL).
  - Champion Labor Monthly, monthly magazine of the YCL.

=== Local and shop publications ===
- Boston Chronicle was published weekly in Boston, MA. The editor was William Harrison.
- Chicago Star was published weekly by the Chicago Star Publishing Co., Inc., Chicago, Illinois Members of the board of directors were Ernest De Maio, Frank Marshall Davis, William L. Patterson, Grant Oakes, and William Sennett. The executive editor was Frank M. Davis; managing editor, Carl Hirsch; and general manager, William Sennett. Howard Fast was a communist, and Rockwell Kent a contributing editor.
- Crisis was the organ of the East Pittsburgh section of the Communist Party.
- District Champion was published by the city committee of the Communist Party of the District of Columbia, with offices located in Washington' D. C. It was published monthly. The editor was William C. Taylor; secretary, Elizabeth Searle.
- Midwest Daily Record was a short-lived Chicago daily covering the meatpacking and other industries.
- Michigan Herald was published weekly by the People's Educational Publishing Association, of Detroit, Michigan. The editor was Hugo Bewaswenger.
- Party Voice was an irregular publication on internal affairs targeted to members of the CPUSA in New York state.
- Roxbury Voice was published in Roxbury, Mass.
- Waterfront Worker (Dec 1932 – 1936) was a mimeographed publication produced in San Francisco under the auspices of the Communist-controlled Maritime Workers' Industrial Union.

== Publications of Communist-supported "Mass Organizations" ==
=== Abraham Lincoln Brigade ===
- Volunteer for Liberty was published monthly by the Abraham Lincoln Brigade in New York City. Periodic supplements were also put out by the Chicago branch of the organization. A paper by the same name was published by the Abraham Lincoln Brigade in Spain.
- Among Friends was published monthly by Friends of the Abraham Lincoln Brigade, New York, NY. The editor was David McKelvy White; editor, Rex Pitkin.
- News on Spain was published monthly by the Veterans of Abraham Lincoln Brigade, New York, NY. The editor was David McKelvy White.

=== American Committee for Protection of Foreign Born ===
- The Lamp was published monthly by the American Committee for Protection of Foreign Born in New York City.
- New York Beacon was the publication of the New York Committee for Protection of Foreign Born.

FIGHT against War and Fascism was the first of three titles used by the CPUSA's anti-militarism mass organization of the 1930s.

=== American League Against War and Fascism/American League for Peace and Democracy ===
- FIGHT against War and Fascism was the monthly newsmagazine of the American League Against War and Fascism, chaired by J.B. Matthews. The large format 10 x 14 publication was printed on newsprint and saddle-stitched, with a cover price of just 5 cents per copy. The editorial office of FIGHT was located at 104 Fifth Avenue in New York City. Contributors to the first issue included Henri Barbusse, John Strachey, Fenner Brockway of the British Independent Labour Party, Roger Baldwin of the American Civil Liberties Union. and artist William Gropper. The publication was launched in November 1933 and ran until December 1937, at which time the publication's name was changed in accordance with the CPUSA's Popular Front line. FIGHT is available on microfilm with the master negative held by the New York Public Library.
  - The Fight for Peace and Democracy: At the end of 1937, with the name of the issuing organization changed to the "American League for Peace and Democracy," the name of FIGHT against War and Fascism was changed to The Fight for Peace and Democracy. The first issue of Fight under the new name appeared in January 1938 and publication continued up to the signing of the Nazi–Soviet Pact in May 1939, at which time the name was changed again. The publication is available on microfilm with the master negative held by the New York Public Library.
  - World for Peace and Democracy was the short-lived final incarnation of the publication of the American League for Peace and Democracy. Only two issues were produced, dated June and July 1939, also available on microfilm held by New York Public Library.

=== American–Russian Institute ===
- The American Review on the Soviet
- Russian Technical Research News
- Soviet Culture, was used irregularly and published by the Committee of the American Russian Institute, 101 Post Street, San Francisco, California. The chairman was Louise R. Bransten.
- Soviet Health Care
- The Soviet Union Today
- The USSR in Construction

=== American Slav Congress ===
- Slav American was the quarterly magazine published in New York City by the American Slav Congress.

=== American Youth for Democracy ===
- AYD in Action was published monthly by the national staff of American Youth for Democracy, New York, NY.
- Spotlight was the official organ for American Youth for Democracy.
- Student Outlook was published by the intercollegiate division of American Youth for Democracy, New York, NY. It was a monthly publication. The editor was Fred Jaffe.
- Teeners' Topics, published irregularly, was an American Youth for Democracy publication, with offices located in' New York, NY. Teen Life was published by New Age Publishers, Inc., in Meriden, Conn., for American Youth for Democracy.
- Youth (CPUSA), a bimonthly publication, was published by American Youth for Democracy, New York.

=== Association for Jewish Colonization in the Soviet Union (ICOR) ===
- Nailebn-New Life (1935–1950), bilingual Yiddish-English monthly published in New York. Continued IKOR magazine, which was established in 1925.

=== Emergency Civil Liberties Committee ===
- Congress and Your Rights, was a weekly bulletin of the Washington, DC office of the Emergency Civil Liberties Committee.

=== Friends of Soviet Russia / Friends of the Soviet Union / National Council of American–Soviet Friendship ===
- The Weekly Bulletin of the Bureau of Information of The Soviet Union (1919): First publication of the Russian Soviet Government Bureau, forerunner of the Friends of Soviet Russia.
  - Soviet Russia (1919–1923): Expanded and illustrated version of The Weekly Bulletin of the Bureau of Information of The Soviet Union. Published first by the Russian Soviet Government Bureau and then by the Friends of Soviet Russia following the forced departure of Ludwig Martens and Santeri Nuorteva from the United States.
  - Soviet Russia Illustrated (1923–1924): Glossy monthly magazine carrying forward Soviet Russia. Merged with The Labor Herald and The Liberator in 1924 to establish The Workers' Monthly, official organ of the Workers (Communist) Party.
- Soviet Russia Today, a monthly magazine published by the Soviet Russia Today Publications, Inc., New York, NY. The editor was Jessica Smith; assistant editor, Andrew Voynow; business manager, Donald Schoalman; literary editor, Isadore Schneider; editorial board, Dorothy Brewster, Robert Dunn, Thyra Edwards, A. A. Heller, Langston Hughes, Dr. John Kingsbury, Corliss Lamont, George Marshall, Isobel Walker Soule, and Maxwell S. Stewart.
  - New World Review was the successor publication to Soviet Russia Today, expanding its coverage from the Soviet Union to the Soviet-dominated countries of Central and Eastern Europe. The long-time editor of the publication was Jessica Smith.
- Reporter (CPUSA), a biweekly publication, was published by the National Council of American-Soviet Friendship, Inc., New York, NY. The editor was William Howard Melish.
- Soviet Sports, was used irregularly and published by the National Council of American-Soviet Friendship, New York. The editor was Eric A. Starbuck.
- American-Soviet Facts, published irregularly in New York City.

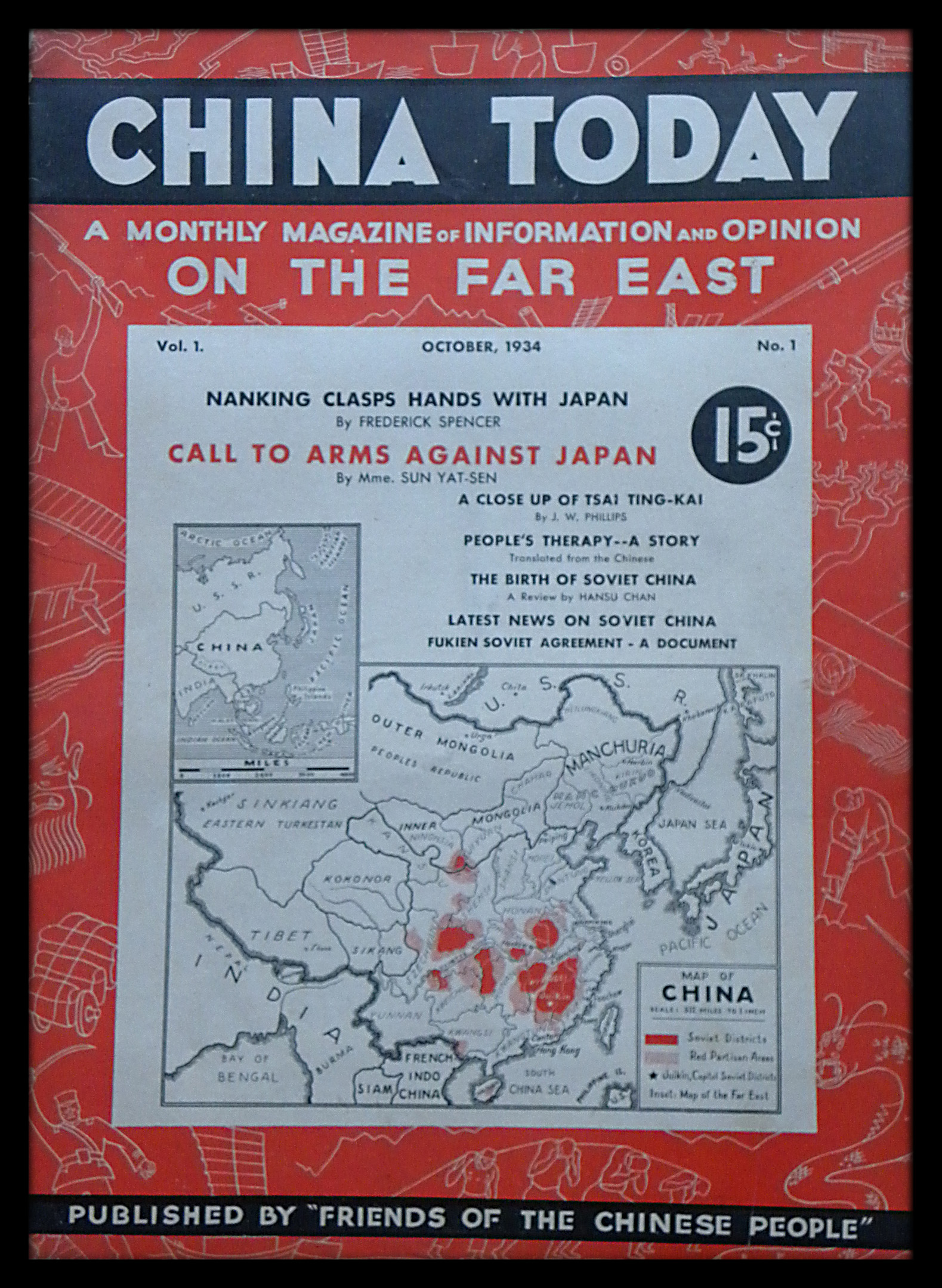
The first issue of the magazine of the Friends of the Chinese People, China Today, was published in 1934.

=== Friends of the Chinese People ===
- China Today, sub-titled "A Monthly Magazine of Information and Opinion on the Far East," was the official organ of the Friends of the Chinese People. The magazine was launched in January 1934 and featured a large format of approximately 10 by 14 inches and originally bore a cover price of 15 cents a copy. First editors were "Hansu Chan," (pen-name of Ji Chaoding) J.W. Phillips (pen-name of Philip Jaffe), and Frederick Spencer. The publication continued through at least March 1942. Hardcopy issues in the collection of the New York Public Library.

=== Independent Citizens Committee of Arts, Sciences, and Professions ===
- The Independent, a bimonthly, was published by the Independent Citizens Committee of Arts, Sciences, and Professions, New York. The executive director was Hannah Dorner.
- Report From Washington was published monthly by the Independent Citizens Committee of Arts, Sciences, and Professions, New York, NY

=== International Labor Defense / Civil Rights Congress ===
- Labor Defender (1926–1941) was the monthly magazine of the International Labor Defense organization. While this membership organization initially contained a substantial non-Communist contingent, by the 1930s its character as an arm of the Communist Party had become clear. In 1968 the magazine was reissued in bound reprint form by the Greenwood Reprint Company.
  - Equal Justice was the new name of Labor Defender during its last years of existence.
- Action Now, official organ of the Civil Rights Congress, published in New York City.
  - Action Bulletin, a weekly, also published in New York City.
  - Action for Today, a monthly, also published in New York City.

=== International Workers Order ===
- Fraternal Outlook was published monthly by the International Workers Order (IWO), New York, NY. The editor was Max Bedacht.
- Voice of 500 was the organ of the Lincoln Steffens Lodge, No. 500, of the IWO, located in New York City. The magazine was edited by Simon Schacter, founder of the lodge.
- Young Fraternalist was the monthly youth magazine published by the IWO in New York. The editor was Sol Vail.

=== Labor Youth League ===
- Challenge, newspaper that served as the official organ of the Labor Youth League.
- Youth Review was another publication of the Labor Youth League.

=== League of American Writers ===
- The Bulletin of the League of American Writers was the newsletter of the League of American Writers. Only a few copies of this publication, which was apparently launched in 1935, have survived.

=== Trade Union Educational League/Trade Union Unity League ===
- Labor Herald (1922–1924): Official monthly magazine of the Trade Union Educational League (TUEL), published in Chicago. While the name of TUEL head William Z. Foster was listed as editor on the masthead, actual duties were handled by managing editor Earl Browder. The magazine was merged along with Soviet Russia Pictorial and The Liberator in 1924 to form The Workers Monthly.
- Labor Unity — Official monthly magazine of the Trade Union Unity League.

=== World Peace Congress ===
- In Defense of Peace was the official organ of the World Peace Congress, a group characterized as a "Communist front" by the United States government.

== Communist-sponsored publications dealing with specific topics ==
=== Agriculture ===
- Facts for Farmers was published monthly by the Farm Research, New York, NY. The publication was founded by Harold Ware. The president of Farm Research and editor was Robert J. Coe, who wrote for the Political Affairs under the pseudonym Robert Digby.

=== Black liberation movement ===
- Congress View was published monthly by the National Negro Congress, New York, NY. The president was Max Yergen; executive secretary, Edward E. Strong; treasurer, Ferdinand C. Smith; secretary, Thelma Dale; labor and legislation director, Dorothy K. Funn; director of publicity, Mayme Brown; editorial board, W. Alphaeus Hunton, Frederick V. Field, Mayme Brown, and Elizabeth Catlett.
- Negro Digest, a Chicago weekly, was published and edited by John H. Johnson. Contributing editors included Henrietta Buckmaster, Langston Hughes, Carey McWilliams, and Mrs. Paul Robeson.
- Negro Quarterly was produced by the Negro Publication Society of America, Inc., New York, NY. Editor was Angelo Herndon; managing editor, Ralph Ellison; contributors, Langston Hughes, Henrietta Buckmaster, L. D. Reddick, Alfred Kreymborg, Charles Humboldt, Norman McLeod, and Louis Harap.
- Negro Affairs Quarterly (1953–1954) was a tabloid quarterly newspaper of the National Negro Commission of the Communist Party USA. The paper published news and articles by the CPUSA's black leadership, including Pettis Perry, William L. Patterson, James W. Ford, and Claudia Jones, and promoted the conclaves of the National Negro Labor Council. The Tamiment Library of New York University holds master negative microfilm of the publication.

=== Civil rights movement ===
- Action was published monthly by the National Federation for Constitutional Liberties, Washington, DC.

=== Current affairs ===
- The Letter was published by The Letter, Inc., Denver, Colo. The editor was Phil Rino; editorial advisory board, David J. Miller, Reid Robinson, Joseph C. Cohen, and Isabelle Gonzalles.
- In Fact, was a weekly newsletter published in New York City by George Seldes from 1940 to 1950. The publication was cited as a "Communist front" by American federal authorities.

=== Drama ===
New Theatre was a glossy magazine produced from 1934 until 1937, succeeding Workers Theatre.

- Workers Theatre was a Communist magazine dedicated to the dramatic arts. The magazine was launched under the auspices of the International Union of the Revolutionary Theatre and the League of Workers' Theatres of the U.S.A. (LOWT) The first number of the irregularly issued magazine was dated April 1931.
  - The publication was published by the New Theatre League in New York, and renamed as New Theatre in January 1934, with publication numbering rolled back to volume 1 in association with the change. This name amended to New Theatre and Film to reflect a broadened focus effective with the start of volume 4 in March 1937.
  - Another new numbering series began in November 1938 with the launch of a successor publication, New Theatre News. The publication began as a small format glossy illustrated magazine but was quickly moved to the use of mimeograph using standard-sized letter paper. Production continued at least through 1942, with few copies surviving.

New York Public Library holds some copies between 1934 and 1941. Marxists' Internet Archive holds PDF copies between 1934 and 1937.

=== Education ===
- Bulletin on Education, irregular, was published by the educational departments of the Communist Party in California.
- The Chart with offices in New York, NY, was issued by the National Organization and Education Commissions of the Communist Party of the United States. Jack Stachel was chairman of the education commission, and Henry Winston was chairman of the organization commission.

=== Health and medicine ===
Health and Hygiene was a CPUSA magazine dedicated to medicine and fitness issued from 1935 to 1938, the height of the Popular Front period.

- American Review of Soviet Medicine, published monthly in New York, NY, was edited by Dr. Jacob Heiman.
- Health and Hygiene was published monthly in New York, NY from 1935 to 1938 as the official organ of the "People's Health Education League." The editors were Carl Malmberg and Peter Morell.

All (except for one) issues of Health and Hygiene can be downloaded from Marcists.org at this link: https://www.marxists.org/history/usa/pubs/health/index.htm

=== International affairs ===
- Amerasia was published monthly by Amerasia in New York City published from 1937 to 1947. It was closely affiliated with the Institute of Pacific Relations. Editors included Philip Jaffe and Kate L. Mitchell.
- Far East Spotlight, also known as Spotlight on the Far East, was the official publication of the Committee for a Democratic Far Eastern Policy.
- Far Eastern Survey was published every other week by the American Council of the Institute of Pacific Relations.
- Indonesian Review was published by the American Committee for Free Indonesia, Los Angeles, California The editor was Charles Bidien; circulation manager, Peter Simatoepang.
- Korean Independence (1943–?) was a bilingual Korean/English newspaper published in Los Angeles.
- New Africa was published monthly by the Council on African Affairs in New York City. The chairman of the group was Paul Robeson and its executive director was Max Yergan.
- New World was published monthly by the Free Press Publishing Corp., Seattle, Washington.
- Our World, was published monthly by John P. Davis in New York City.
- Pacific Affairs was the quarterly magazine of the Pacific Council of the Institute of Pacific Relations.
- Report on World Affairs was published monthly in New York City. Its editor was Johannes Steel.
- Trend and Times — was published monthly by Louis Adamic, Milford, N. J. Adamic was the editor and publisher.
- Voice of Freedom, New York, NY, was published monthly by the International Coordination Council. The editor was Richard Storrs Childs; associate editor, Minette Kuhn.

=== Jewish ===
- Jewish Life (1946–1956) was launched in November 1946 as an English-language monthly by the CP-affiliated Yiddish-language Morning Freiheit. Editors included Louis Harap and Morris Schappes. The publication split from the Communist Party during the 1956 factional struggle and continues in 2011 as an independent progressive publication.

=== Labor movement ===
- Economic Notes was published monthly by Labor Research Association, New York City. The long-time editor was Robert Dunn.
- Industrial Journal was published monthly by James J. Boutselis, of Lowell, Massachusetts.
- News of World Labor was published monthly by the Committee for AF of L Participation in World Federation of Trade Unions, Brooklyn, NY.
- Pension Builder was a specialized magazine relating to pension issues, the official organ of the Washington Pension Union.
- Railroad Worker's' Link was published by the Communist Party in New York, NY, as a monthly publication. The editor was Robert Wood.
- Voice of Action was published by Washington State Communist Party members engaged in labor and unemployed organizing from 1933 to 1936.

=== Law ===
- Guild Lawyer was the official publication of the National Lawyers Guild. The magazine was edited in New York City by Simon Schacter.
- National Lawyers Guild Quarterly was a journal of the National Lawyers Guild.
- International Juridical Association Monthly Bulletin was the organ of the International Juridical Association, a group which succeeded the National Lawyers Guild.

=== Peace ===
- Peace Crusader was the official organ of the American Peace Crusade.
  - Peace Reporter was another publication of the American Peace Crusade.

=== Popular culture ===
- Hollywood Independent was published monthly by the Hollywood Independent Citizens' Committee of Arts, Sciences, and Professions, Hollywood, California. The editor was Hollister Noble.
- Readers' Scope was published monthly by Picture Scope, Inc., New York, NY.

=== Religion ===
- Protestant was published monthly by Protestant Digest of New York City. The editor was Kenneth Leslie.

=== Social work ===
- Social Work Today was characterized by the US Government as a "Communist magazine" in 1944.

=== Sports ===
- Sport Call was launched in 1936 as the magazine of the "Workers' Sports League of America." In addition to subscriber mailings the monthly publication appeared as an insert in the Neue Volks-Zeitung. No issues are extant after the June/July 1938 issue of the publication.

=== Veterans affairs ===
- Salute was published monthly by the Veterans Publishing Co., New York, NY. The publisher was Jeremiah Ingersoll. The executive director was Max Baird and the managing editor was DeWitt Gilpin.

=== Women's liberation movement ===
- Working Woman was issued in New York by the National Women's Department of the Communist Party starting in 1927. The publication began as a tabloid newspaper, switching to magazine format in 1933 and continuing under that title through 1935.
  - The Woman Today continued for Working Woman in 1936, with the more inclusive name clearly chosen as a nod to the party's Popular Front tactics of the period. Publication was terminated in 1937. The magazine was retroactively declared by the US Government in 1944 to be a so-called "Communist front."
- Facts for Women was published monthly by Facts for Women, Los Angeles, California. The editor was Mary Inman.
- Woman Power was published monthly by the Congress of American Women in New York, NY. Members of the editor board are Edna Moss, Bert Sigred, and Eleanor Vaughn. The president was Gene Weltfish; executive vice president, Muriel Draper; treasurer, Helen Phillips; and secretary, Josephine Timms.
- Bulletin of Congress of American Women was published monthly by the Congress of American Women, New York, NY. The editorial board was composed of those on the Board of Woman Power.

== Soviet publications for America ==
- Information Bulletin, triweekly, was published by the Embassy of the Union of Soviet Socialist Republics, Washington, DC.
- New Times (Moscow) was published semiweekly by Mezhdunarodnaya Kniga, Moscow, Russia. It was distributed in the United States by the Four Continental Book Corp., New York, NY.
- The USSR was published bimonthly from 1956 on.
