= Abraham A. Heller =

Co-founder of International Publishers and director of the Soviet Bureau

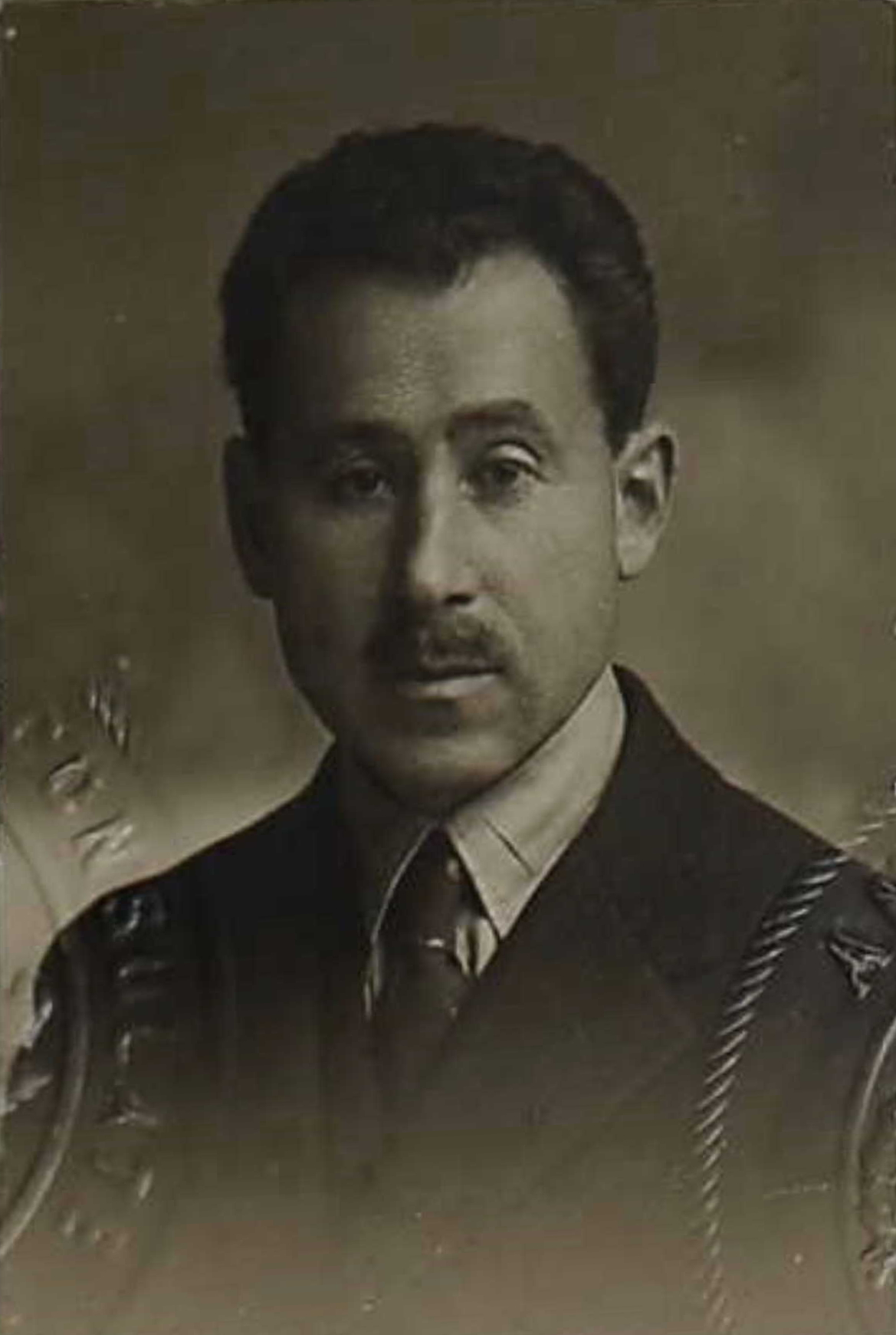
- Heller's passport photo
- Born: Abraham Aaron Heller; October 1874; Minsk, Russian Empire
- Died: September 1962 (aged 87)
- Education: Harvard University
- Known for: work at Soviet Bureau, co-founding International Publishers
- Political party: Socialist Party of America, Communist Party USA

Abraham Aaron Heller, best known as A.A. Heller, was a Russian-American who served as commercial director of the Russian Soviet Government Bureau (or "Soviet Bureau") as of 1919 and co-founded International Publishers with Alexander Trachtenberg in 1924.

== Background ==
Abraham Aaron Heller was born in October 1874 in Minsk, Russian Empire, the son of a wealthy jeweler Lazarus Heller, owner of L. Heller & Son, with offices in New York City and Paris.

== Career ==
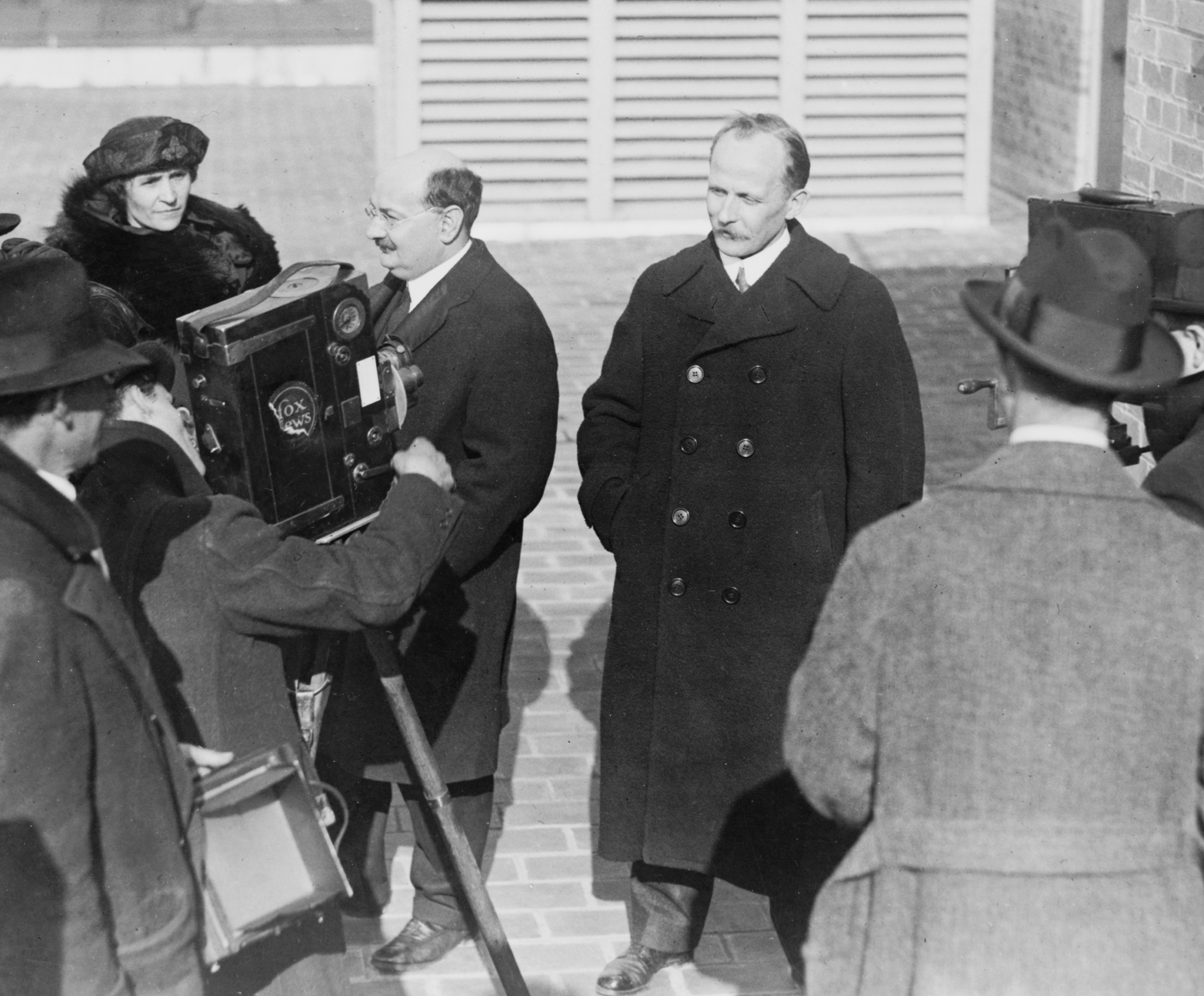
Heller was a director of the Soviet Bureau under Ludwig Martens (right, accompanied by fellow director Santeri Nuorteva and wife, 1920)

In 1891, the Russian-born Heller emigrated to the USA. In 1892, he joined the socialist movement. After studying at Harvard University, he went into the jewelry business in Paris for a few years. He ran the Paris office of his father's company, L. Heller & Son, from 1903 to 1910; the office disbanded in 1911. (Company employees included Auguste Victor Louis Verneuil, inventor of the Verneuil process or "flame fusion" process of synthesizing corundum, rubies, and sapphires.)

In 1910, Heller co-founded the International Oxygen Company in New York City and served as its general manager. International Oxygen Company had its headquarters in Newark, New Jersey. (According to a 1914 blue book, Abraham A. Heller was treasurer, while a Solomon Heller was president and Jacob Heller was secretary.) He was also a partner in Allied Drug and Chemical.

From 1909 to 1920, Heller helped finance the New York Call, New York City-based daily newspaper of the Socialist Party of America. In 1917, he was instrumental in funding the purchase of the headquarters building for the Rand School of Social Science.

In 1919, Heller became director of the commercial department for the Soviet Bureau, headed by Ludwig Martens. Julius Hammer (father of Armand Hammer), founder of Allied Drug and Chemical and thus Heller's partner, was one of the bureau's six directors. The commercial department was the "heart of the Bureau." In late 1919, Heller boasted that 2,500 American firms had expressed interest in doing business with the new USSR, while meatpackers in Chicago (including Swift & Co.) denied that they would trade with "enemies of the United States." In early 1920, Heller announced that the Soviet Bureau would operate on a barter basis and that the Soviet government conducted all foreign trade as a monopoly.

During the 1920s, Heller introduced the acetylene welding industry to the Soviet Union.

In 1921, Heller helped start the Friends of Soviet Russia and published occasionally in its journal Soviet Russia.

In 1922, Heller became the American representative of the Supreme Council of National Economy of Soviet Russia (Vesenkha)."

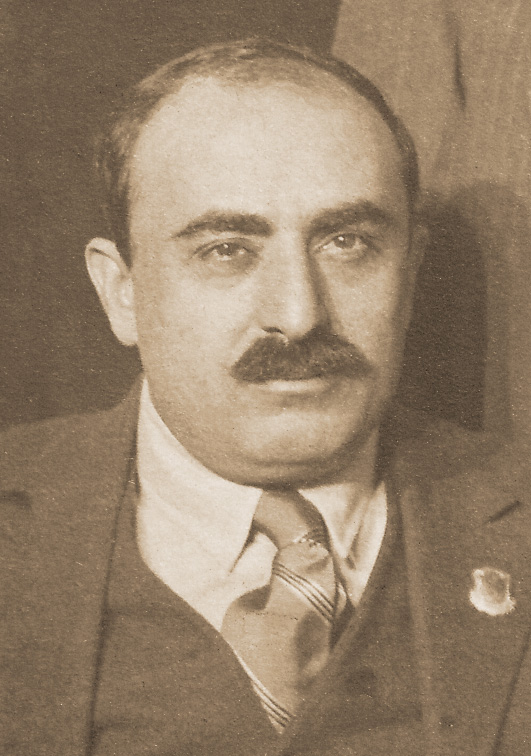
Heller financed International Publishers, run by Alexander Trachtenberg (here, Moscow in Fall 1922)

In 1924, Heller co-founded, financed, and owned International Publishers, which printed or imported books and pamphlets from the USSR, while Alexander Trachtenberg served as "manager, editor, salesman." As "angel investor," Heller owned 51%, while the Comintern owned 49%, so that the publisher looked like a private business, according to ex-communist witness Benjamin Gitlow. Trachtenberg claimed that Heller and he split ownership 50-50. Trachtenberg also said that Heller's wife helped incorporate the company. Trachtenberg met Heller when Heller was serving on the board of the Rand School (director in 1918) and Trachtenberg was a teacher there.

In 1927, Philip Fried, general manager, said that Samuel Heller, president of Heller & Son, had signed a contract with the Russky Samotzvet (Soviet State Trust) for rights to mine the "vast emerald fields" in the Urals mountains in the USSR, in return for American capital and management of a joint mining operation. The New York Times reported that $1 million of emeralds had hit US markets as a result.

In 1938, Heller ("of Chappaqua, New York") served as purchasing agent for the North American Committee to Aid Spain, which had raised more than $1 million in cash and materials.

In 1939, the Dies Committee announced Heller was the first "millionaire Red" found. In 1940, Heller's name came up during Dies Committee hearings during testimony by Benjamin Gitlow and Alexander Trachtenberg.

In 1950, Heller was a director of the Jefferson School of Social Sciences (successor to the New York Workers School as well as president of People's Radio Foundation, Inc. Directors of People's Radio included Joseph R. Brodsky as well as Rockwell Kent and Peter Shipka of the International Workers Order.

Heller died in September 1962.

== Personal ==
Heller was married to Edith Heller.

During testimony to the Dies Committee, Trachtenberg stated the Heller was a "very wealthy man" and "a millionaire before the Russian Revolution."

Heller was a member of the Communist Party USA, as well as annual member of the Metropolitan Museum of Art in New York City and patron of the Jewish Encyclopedia.

Heller bought a farm in Bernardsville, New Jersey, shortly after returning from Paris around 1910.

== Works ==
- "A Program of Reconstruction," Soviet Russia (November 1, 1922)
- The Industrial Revival in Soviet Russia (1922)
- One Hundred Years in Ten: Soviets Continue Advance (undated)
- Who Wants War? (1935)

== See also ==
- Soviet Bureau
- Ludwig Martens
- International Publishers
- Alexander Trachtenberg
