= Jack Hardy (labor leader) =

American Communist teacher

- New York City teacher Dale Zysman pictured in The New York Times, June 6, 1941
- Born: Dale Zysman; November 18, 1901?
- Died: July 2, 1993 (aged 91)?
- Other name: Richard Enmale
- Education: Columbia University
- Years active: 1927-1941 (Manhattan-based teacher)
- Employer: Manhattan public school system
- Known for: membership in New York Teachers Union and Communist Party

Jack Hardy (born Dale Zysman; November 18, 1901 – July 2, 1993?), was a 20th-Century Communist author labor leader as "Jack Hardy", and a teacher and board member of the New York City Teachers Union under his birth name "Dale Zysman". Investigation by the New York Board of Education (now the New York City Department of Education) led to public awareness that the two names belonged to one person and subsequent expulsion from the school system in 1941.

== Career ==
=== High school coach ===
In November 1927, Zysman is pictured as a football coach of the "New Utrecht Gridders" of Brooklyn. In September 1928, he is listed as one of three football coaches in Brooklyn. "Zysman steps into the shoes of Hyman Saul, who withdrew after being at the helm for two years. Zysman was Saul's assistant in 1927." Zysman's football team lost in October 1928 but was thought ready to win in November. Yet shortly thereafter, the local Brooklyn Daily Eagle reported:

Although this is his first year at the helm as mentor, Dale Zysman is said to have already tired of the job. He has been meeting with mediocre success due to the fact that he was left with only a handful of veteran players. Zysman succeeded Hyman Saul, who resigned and withdrew from the school system last year.

By the end of the month, the newspaper was reporting that Zysman was one of four coaches expected to be fired for their team's poor season performance. However, Zysman weathered his first year, as he receives mention in the same position in 1930 for spring training. By September 1930 as the new football season started up, the local newspaper was reporting:

Coach Dale Zysman and Assistant Coaches Raskin and Levin have a powerful working force this season made up of 16 regulars and scrubs from 1929. In addition the newcomers are the most likely looking batch Coach Zysman has had to work with since he took over the team two years ago... Coach Zysman will be able t o master his plays earlier than in previous seasons and he hopes to get the jump on the rival schools and get off on the right foot at the outset.

=== Closet communist ===
In the 1920s, "Jack Hardy" was a member of a class taught by Scott Nearing that sought a law of social revolution (though, according to Whittaker Chambers, "an infiltration of Communists... really ran the class, steered the discussions," and tried to "make the law of social revolution a Marxian law.") Members included Sam Krieger, Eve Dorf, and her husband Ben Davidson, as well as Alfred J. Brooks, Myra Page, Benjamin Mandel, and Rachel Ragozin.

In 1937, Hardy was one of eleven Communist Party members who was also a member of the board of the New York City Teachers Union and in December of that year became chairman of the board. (The Teachers Union and the Teachers Guild of New York reformed in 1960 as the United Federation of Teachers.) According to Harvey Klehr, "The American Federation of Teachers' Local 5 in New York, the union's largest affiliate, was [Communist] Party stronghold. Its vice president, Dale Zysman, was a Communist who used the pen name of Jack Hardy." Klehr also mentions that Bella Dodd was a close associate. In Dodd's memoir, she states: "We had one man in the [Teachers] Union who was so talented in manipulation that he was regarded as the Stalin of the Union -- Dale Zysman, also known as Jack Hardy. He had been to Moscow."

== Dismissal ==
In 1938, Zysman remained vice president of the Teachers Union.

In 1939, he was listed as a party official using the name "Jack Hardy, identified as a New York schoolteacher" when providing visa for a false passport obtained for Fred E. Beal (fugitive from justice and a leader of the 1929 Gastonia strike)." who was to travel on to disillusionment in the Soviet Union.

In 1940, U.S. Representative Martin Dies, Jr. (Democrat - Texas, 2nd district) had already marked him out as a subversive: "Dale Zysman, teacher in the public schools of New York, has written books for the Party under the name of 'Jack Hardy'."

In February 1941, he championed the plight of other teachers before he, too, got call to testify. By March 1941, Zysman was implicated again:

A conference of Communists attended by history teachers from both Brooklyn College and City College to lay out a broad program of publication of pamphlets and brochures giving the Communist interpretation of history was described to the Rapp-Coudert legislative committee today at a public hearing. The committee's star witness so far, William M. Canning, City College instructor who resigned from the Communist Party last year, also added 17 more names of alleged City College Communists to the 34 he cited yesterday, and described how - the Communists sought, usually with success, to dominate meetings of the College Teachers' Unions. The meeting of the Communist historians, Canning said, was held in the office"of Alex Trachtenberg, president of International Publishers. 'The purpose,' he said under questioning by committee counsel Paul Windels, 'was to discuss a program for proving the validity of the thesis the Communists were then using that Communism was Americanism of the 20th Century.' Canning did not give the date of the meeting, but it apparently was before the signing of the Hitler-Stalin pact in 1939. Those present, he said, included Dale Zysman, vice-president of Local 5 of the Teachers Union, teachers Henry L. Klein and Emil Morais of Brooklyn College, Philip and Jack Foner of the CUNY history faculty, and two well-known Communists who were not teachers, Anna Rochester and Henry Aptheker, as well as Canning himself.

Another paper reported that "Dale Zysman," vice president of the Teachers Union, asserted that he knew of a 'dozen or so' high school teachers who have been subpoenaed by the committee and the latter group confirmed that a number of such Instructors had already testified as to conditions in their schools."

Later that March, the New York Sun reported that Zysman was not only the communist "Jack Hardy" but also "Richard Enmale," a name devised "by taking the first two letters from the names, Engels, Marx and Lenin."

On June 5, 1941, William Levich, former assistant director of the Workers School, and Benjamin Mandel testified before the Coudert committee that Zysman, then a Manhattan P.S. 39 teacher and vice president of the Teachers Union, that he a communist and someone who had recently been to the Soviet Union, and had used the Party name "Jack Hardy." That same day, Alfred J. Brooks, a teacher at Brownx P. S. 61, and Howard Selsam, a professor at Brooklyn College, refused to testify. Two of the day's witnesses were Benjamin Gitlow and Joseph Zach, both former high-ranking Communists. Gitlow testified that Brooks had lived in the Soviet Union from 1926 until 1932 and worked a Comintern office under the name of "A. G. Bosse." Seven teachers, including Henry L. Klein and Zysman, refused to testify that day. "Mr. Zysman insisted he was not "declining to answer," but "refraining from answering," reported the New York Sun. The following day, Friday, June 6, 1941:

Dr. Harold G. Campbell, superintendent of schools, acting upon evidence of alleged Communist activity by the teachers, canceled Klein's assignment and suspended Alfred J. Brooks of Public School 61, the Bronx, and Dale Zysman, vice president of the Teachers Union of Public School 89, Manhattan.

On June 10, 1941, Zysman had a letter to the Brooklyn Daily Eagle published:

Editor School Page — Sir: Statements about me on the School Page of June 6 are inaccurate and misleading. You state that "for years there has been speculation" as to whether Dale Zysman and Jack Hardy are the same person and that "Mr. Zysman has remained mum on the subject." The facts of the matter are that nearly two years ago I addressed a communication to the Board of Superintendents advising them that "I have published several books under the pen name of Jack Hardy." This has long been a matter of common knowledge to all of my friends and most of my associates. I sent a copy of this communication to the Board of Education and shortly thereafter it was quoted in the New York Teacher, monthly organ of the Teachers Union. I also advised the Coudert Committee of the same fact when I appeared before them at a private hearing on October 9 last. When so much was made of this fact at the public hearings of the Coudert Committee on June 4, I was at a loss to understand what the "exposure" was all about. Except, of course, that for reasons of their own Messrs. Coudert and Windels seem to prefer to do things this way. DALE ZYSMAN.

Vice-president, Teachers Union

By June 12, the board had affirmed the suspension of two of the teachers who refused to testify before the Rapp-Coudert Committee: Alfred J. Brooks and Dale Zysman.

On September 9, 1941, Zysman went on trial at the Board of Education for refusing to testify before the Rapp-Coudert legislative committee, investigating subversive activities in public schools. Harold C. Campbell accused Zysman Communist party involvement, hampering the legislative inquiry, giving false testimony at private hearings, then refusing to testify at open hearings. "Zysman has filed a general denial of the allegations."

On September 17, 1941, the New York Sun ran the headline "Zysman Identified as Red: Teachers Union Leader Tried in Absence After He Walks Out on Hearing."

Zysman's attorney Vito Marcantonio had asked for a ten-day stay because the Board had failed to present "an itemized bill of particulars," which stay the Board denied, so Zysman walked out. The Board's counsel, Charles C. Weinstein, declared that charges served on Zysman in July been itemized and constituted a bill of particulars. Weinstein called the walk-out a "smokescreen" and asked that the trial proceed, a request granted. Benjamin Mandel, a former teacher and former communist, then testified that he had known Zysman in the party as "Jack Hardy." Further, Zysman/Hardy was "especially active in the Pioneer Youth, the junior wings of the Reds." Lastly, Mandel stated that any Communist teacher was expected by the Party to "inculcate communistic ideals in children." (By 1941, Mandel had become a special investigator for the Dies Committee and later served on the committee's successor HUAC as chief researcher during the Hiss-Chambers Case. In his 1952 memoir, Chambers noted, "I knew personally just one member of its staff—Ben Mandel, its able chief researcher... the former business manager of the Daily Worker.")

On September 18, 1942, the Brooklyn Daily Eagle reported that the trial committee of the Board of Education was ready to open a new trial tomorrow of another teacher facing similar charges, after "having completed its trial of Dale Zysman, teacher at P. S. 89, Manhattan, and vice-president of the Teachers Union, accused of communistic activities and of writing communistic books under the name of Jack Hardy."

In 1942, Zysman filed a lawsuit to recover his pension after his dismissal. In 1952, Chambers recalled, "Circa 1941, Zysman's party membership was suspected or discovered. He was eased out of the schools in an incident that made a day's headlines. Later, he went to work for the Communist Labor Research Group, which included among others, Comrade Grace Hutchins."

== Works ==
Hardy described the inspiration for his book The First American Revolution: "The thesis of this book is taken from V. I. Lenin's famous address to American workers: "The history of modern civilized America opens with one of those great, really liberating, really revolutionary wars... It was a war of the American people against English robbers who subjected America and held it in colonial slavery..."

His book Labor and Textiles formed part of a series by International Publishers which included: Labor and Steel by Horace B. Davis, Labor and Coal by Anna Rochester, Labor and Lumber by Charlotte Todes, Labor and Automobiles by Robert W. Dunn, and Labor and Silk by Grace Hutchins (illustrated by Chambers' future wife, Esther Shemitz).

- The Economic Organization of the Soviet Union, with Scott Nearing (New York, Vanguard Press: 1927)
- Labor and Textiles: A Study of Cotton and Wool Manufacturing, with Robert W. Dunn (New York, International Publishers: 1931)
- Clothing Workers: A Study of the Conditions and Struggles in the Needle Trades (New York, International Publishers: 1935)
- The First American Revolution (New York, International Publishers: 1937)
- The Civil War in the United States by Karl Marx and Friedrich Engels, edited by Richard Enmale, (New York: International Publishers, 1937)
