= The Civil War in the United States =

Essay collection by Karl Marx and Friedrich Engels

The Civil War in the United States is a collection of articles on the American Civil War by Karl Marx and Friedrich Engels, written between 1861 and 1862 for the New-York Tribune and Die Presse of Vienna, and correspondence between Marx and Engels between 1860 and 1866. It was published as a book in 1937, edited and with an introduction by Richard Enmale.

In 2016 International Publishers produced a completely revised second edition of The Civil War in the United States, edited and with an introduction by Andrew Zimmerman.

The articles promote the Union side of the war, arguing that the conflict was fundamentally about slavery.

== Editions ==
- Marx, Karl; Engels, Friedrich (1937). Enmale, Richard (ed.). The Civil War in the United States. New York: International Publishers. OCLC 250480672.
- Marx, Karl; Engels, Friedrich (2016). Zimmerman, Andrew (ed.). The Civil War in the United States (2nd ed.). New York: International Publishers.
