= RSGB =

RSGB can refer to the following:

== Organizations ==
- Radio Society of Great Britain, a radio operators organization established in 1913
- Reform Synagogues of Great Britain, former name for Movement for Reform Judaism (UK).
- Russian Soviet Government Bureau, informal diplomatic organization in the US from 1919 to 1921

== Videogames ==
- Russian Spetsnaz Guards Brigade, a playable faction in the game Tom Clancy's EndWar
