= Russian Socialist Federation =

American political organization

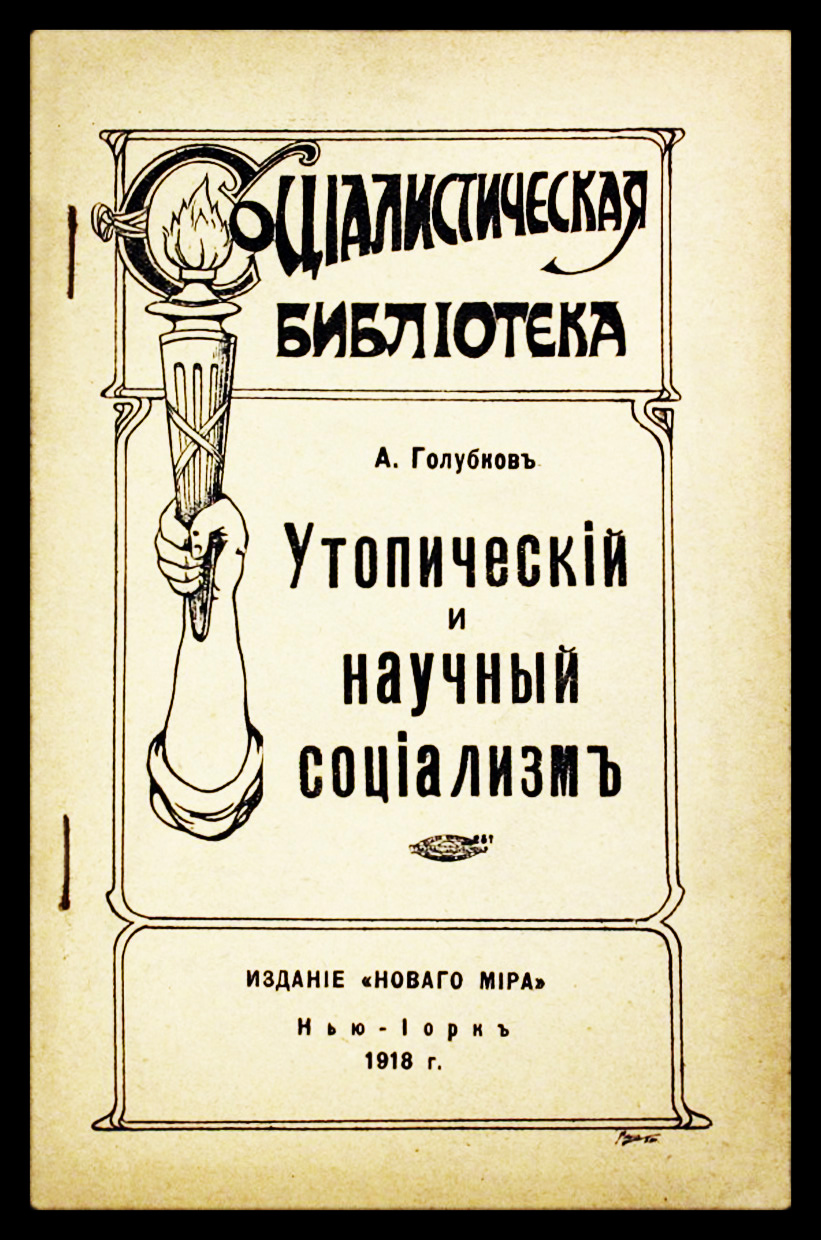
Utopian and Scientific Socialism, a pamphlet by A. Golubkov published by the Russian Socialist Federation in 1918.

The Russian Socialist Federation was a semi-autonomous American political organization which was part of the Socialist Party of America from 1915 until the split of the national organization into rival socialist and communist organizations in the summer of 1919. Elements of the Russian Socialist Federation became key components of both the Communist Party of America and the rival Communist Labor Party of America as "Russian Federations" within these organizations. Following the unification of these two groups in 1921, the resulting unified Russian Communist Federation gradually evolved into the so-called Russian Bureau of the Communist Party USA.

== Organizational history ==
=== Early years ===
Following the failure of the Russian Revolution of 1905, a large number of members and active supporters of the Russian Socialist Revolutionary Party and the Bolshevik and Menshevik wings of the Russian Social Democratic Labor Party elected to follow the course of political emigration to America. These politically minded individuals sought to form a political organization within the so-called "Russian colony" in America, with the initial intent of assisting the revolutionary movement in Russia which was working to overthrow the Tsarist regime of Nikolai Romanov. To this end, various branches of Russian-speaking revolutionary socialists began to be formed in those areas of the country with a significant émigré population. The national organization uniting these local groups was known as the Russian Socialist Federation.

The Russian Socialist Federation maintained its own daily newspaper called Novyi Mir (New World), published in New York. This paper was for a time edited by Nikolai Bukharin, later one of the top leaders of Soviet Russia after the Russian Revolution of 1917. Contributors included Leon Trotsky, who wrote for the paper during his brief interlude in New York City from his arrival in the city in the first days of 1917 until his departure on March 27, 1917. The paper's office was located "in a dingy hole at the rear of the cellar" at 77 St. Mark's Place.

=== Admission to the Socialist Party of America ===
The "Federation of Russian Branches" was admitted to the Socialist Party of America in May 1915, with party records indicating that the group had an average of 113 dues-paying members in its first year of affiliation.

=== Impact of the Russian Revolution ===
The Russian Revolution of 1917, marking the downfall of the tsarist state and its replacement by a revolutionary Marxist government headed by Vladimir Lenin exerted an enormous impact on the émigré community in the United States. A political party which touted just 11,000 members in May 1917 had effectively seized control of a great state, demonstrating to many adherents of socialism that a slow process of building a political organization and winning the support of a majority of the population was not strictly necessary.

In the words of historian Theodore Draper:

"The supreme lesson seemed to be that a small party could seize power if only it had enough revolutionary zeal and purity of doctrine. No revolutionary group could guarantee numbers, but zeal and doctrine could be had for the asking. Such was the infinitely optimistic horizon that the Bolshevik revolution appeared to open up."

Only a few months before the leader of the Red Army himself, Leon Trotsky, had been among the Russian émigré community as a journalist in New York City, writing for the newspaper of the Russian Federation. Now he sat next to Lenin at the head of a dramatic revolution of world-historical importance. The speed and proximity of the transformation was shocking and its impact electrifying.

Efforts to construct a unified revolutionary organization proceeded apace. The Marxists of the Russian Socialist Federation attempted to join with its populist and anarchist comrades in a unified organization through a convention of the United Russian parties held in New York City from February 1 to 4, 1918. Socialist Gregory Weinstein — editor of Novyi Mir and later a founding member of the Communist Labor Party of America — was elected chairman of the session. The gathering sent a cable to the Council of People's Commissars in Moscow sending greetings to revolutionary Russia and indicating that they were "ready to organize Revolutionary Legions for Russia."

The Russian Federation was also instrumental in the formation of the American Bolshevik Bureau of Information early in 1918, uniting with four other Russian groups as well as the English-speaking Socialist Propaganda League. Nicholas Hourwich represented the Russian Federation on this body, being joined by Soviet Russian representative Ludwig Martens as the delegate of the "New York Section of Russian Bolsheviki" and S. J. Rutgers of the Socialist Propaganda League. The Bureau, which served as a forerunner of the official Russian Soviet Government Bureau, was headed by Louis C. Fraina.

The Russian Socialist Federation held its 4th National Convention in New York City from September 28 through October 2, 1918. The gathering elected future Communist Party of America stalwarts Oscar Tyverovsky was elected Secretary of the Russian Federation and Alexander Stoklitsky as "Translator-Secretary," a functionary of the national Socialist Party of America with an office at party headquarters in Chicago.

The gathering also determined to convene a gathering of the various language groups associated with the former Russian empire — Lithuanian, Latvian, Ukrainian, Jewish, and Polish, in addition to the Russian — in order "to effect unity of action of all Russian Federations and organizations by one united center." This unification of various language federations under the aegis of the Russian Socialist Federation was soon to have repercussions, accelerating development of a split of the Socialist Party between its revolutionary Left Wing and the electorally oriented individuals who had long dominated the party apparatus.

=== The split of 1919 ===
During the first two months of 1919 a concrete Left Wing Section established itself within the ranks of the Socialist Party of America (SPA). Inspired by the November 1917 Bolshevik Revolution in Russia and disgruntled over the largely ineffectual Socialist Party electoral campaign of 1918, this group began to unite around the February 1919 elections of members of the 15-member National Executive Committee which governed the SPA.

A programmatic document called the Left Wing Manifesto, written by a committee in New York and thoroughly revised by Louis Fraina, began to be circulated among locals and branches of the Socialist Party for their approval. A new weekly publication called The Revolutionary Age, edited in Boston by Louis Fraina, was established to advance the Left Wing cause. In April 1919, the Left Wing Section of the Socialist Party of Local New York established yet another weekly newspaper called The New York Communist.

The foreign language federations of the Socialist Labor Party, led in the first place by the Russian Federation, were among the leaders of this drive to "capture" the Socialist Party for revolutionary socialism. Language branches of the unified "Russian Federations" often delivered their votes en bloc for slates of candidates in each of the Socialist Party's five regional electoral districts, allowing the candidates approved by the Left Wing to garner sufficient votes for election to a majority of the 15 seats on the NEC.

The outgoing National Executive Committee, dominated by older and more cautious adherents of the Socialist Party's traditional electoral approach to the winning of state power, were not about to surrender without a fight, however. A cry of election fraud was raised, culminating with the June 1919 suspension of seven of the party's language federations and the annulment of the 1919 election pending the decision of an August 1919 Emergency National Convention of the party.

== Prominent members ==
- Nikolai Bukharin
- Jacob Golos
- Abram Jakira

== See also ==
- Language federation
