= International Association of Friends of the Soviet Union =

The International Association of Friends of the Soviet Union was an organization formed on the initiative of the Communist International in 1927, with the purpose of coordinating solidarity efforts with the Soviet Union around the world. It grew out of existing initiatives like Friends of Soviet Russia in the United States, the Association of Friends of the New Russia in Germany, and the Hands Off Russia campaign that had emerged during the early 1920s in Great Britain and elsewhere.

== Organizational history ==
=== Establishment ===
In 1927 the Union of Soviet Socialist Republics celebrated the 10th anniversary of the Russian Revolution with much fanfare. Supporters of the Soviet Union flocked to Moscow to attend the official Revolution Day festivities slated for November 7. The Communist International decided to make use of this opportunity to bring together representatives of the various national "friendship societies," centralizing their activities in a single international organization to be known as the International Association of Friends of the Soviet Union. An organizing committee for the new association was named, with representatives of the Communist Party of the Soviet Union and the Communist Party of Great Britain playing a leading role.

The founding congress of FSU was held at the House of the Trade Unions in Moscow November 10–12, 1927. 917 delegates from 40 countries assisted the conference. Leading figures in the organization were Clara Zetkin and Henri Barbusse. National sections of FSU was formed in various countries.

== National sections ==
=== Australia ===
The Australian FSU was established in 1930. In the mid-1930s there was an attempt on behalf of the Commonwealth to ban the organization. The organization was later reconstituted as the Australia-Soviet Friendship League.

=== Canada ===
The Canadian-Soviet Friendship Society was established in 1949 with Dyson Carter as president and Dorise Nielsen as executive secretary. Carter edited News-Facts About the USSR from 1950 to 1956 and the pro-Soviet glossy magazine Northern Neighbours from 1956 to 1989. The CSFS succeeded the National Council for Canadian Soviet Friendship, which had been founded during World War II to support the USSR as a war ally. Earlier, a Canadian branch of the American-based Friends of Soviet Russia had also existed from the mid-1920s to the late 1930s.

In 1960, the CSFS became the USSR-Canada Friendship Association. It was led by Leslie Hunt and then, after 1972, Michael Lucas. After the fall of the Soviet Union, Lucus founded the Canadian Friends of Soviet People as a successor organization. Its journal, the Northstar Compass, was published from 1992 until 2017. Lucas was also the founder and leader of the International Council for Friendship and Solidarity with the Soviet People. The organisation was intended to be a successor organization to the International Association of Friends of the Soviet Union.

=== Mexico ===
Mexican poster for meeting commemorating the 51st death anniversary of Karl Marx. Amigos de la URSS was one of the organisers of the meeting

In Mexico, the association Amigos de la Union Sovietica combatiente was founded in 1942.

=== Norway ===
Sovjet-Unionens venner, the FSU branch in Norway, was founded in 1928. Adam Egede-Nissen was chairman of the organization 1933-1935. Later Nordahl Grieg became the chairman of the organization. The organization was banned under the German occupation, along with the Communist Party, on August 16, 1940.

=== Romania ===
An organization following the international model was set up in Romania by the Romanian Communist Party activist Petre Constantinescu-Iași in the spring of 1934, at a time of relative détente between the Soviet and Romanian governments (see Greater Romania). Centered in Chişinău and later in Bucharest, it reunited a sizable panel of communist and non-committed intellectuals, and favored Soviet-Romanian cultural ventures, raising controversy after a delegation led by Alexandru Sahia illegally crossed into Soviet territory to attend the anniversary of the October Revolution. It was ultimately outlawed in November of the same year by the Gheorghe Tătărescu cabinet, and was succeeded by the Society for Maintaining Cultural Links between Romania and the Soviet Union, created in May 1935 and itself outlawed in 1938. Various attempts to build on the Amicii URSS legacy during World War II remained unsuccessful, but after the start of Soviet occupation, in November 1944, the Romanian Society for Friendship with the Soviet Union (ARLUS) was founded. It survived as an officially-endorsed cultural institution during the early stages of the Communist regime, but was disbanded in 1964, when the Romanian Communist leader Gheorghe Gheorghiu-Dej announced a "national path to communism" and proceeded to distance himself from the Soviet Union.

=== South Africa ===
The FSU established a branch in South Africa, which non-communists were invited to join. In March 1934, the FSU took part in the formation of the League against Fascism and War along with the Communist Party, Labour Party members, trade unionists, etc. During the Second World War the FSU campaigned for support for the Soviet war effort. During the early 1940s, the FSU made significant inroads amongst the Indian community.

=== Spain ===
Amigos de la Union Sovietica (AUS) was founded in 1925. The organization played an important role in the antifascist struggle during the Spanish Civil War.

=== Sweden ===
A Swedish FSU branch, Sovjet-Unionens vänner, was founded in 1930. In 1935 a Social Democrat from Mölndal, Edvin Trettondal, became the chairman of the organization, which resulted in his expulsion from the Social Democratic Party. He later joined the Communist Party. By the late 1930s the organization disintegrated. A section of its members, including Trettondal, formed the association Sovjet-Nytt.

=== United Kingdom ===
The Friends of the Soviet Union was established in the United Kingdom in 1930 and was eventually succeeded by the British-Soviet Friendship Society.

=== United States ===
In the United States the Friends of Soviet Russia was formally established in August 1921 with Alfred Wagenknecht serving as the group's first Executive Secretary. With the establishment of the new international association the name of the organization was changed to the Friends of the Soviet Union. The organization published a monthly magazine entitled Soviet Russia Today.
