= Lydia Gibson =

American artist

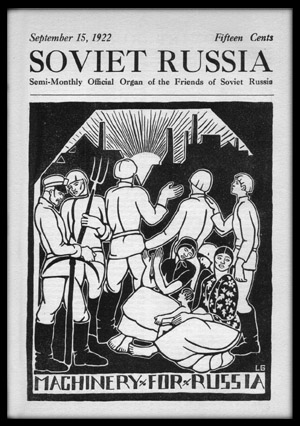
Lydia Gibson contributed the cover art for this magazine produced by The Friends of Soviet Russia.

Lydia Gibson (1891-1964) was an American socialist illustrator who contributed work to The Masses, The Liberator, The Workers' Monthly, New Masses, and other radical publications.

== Biography ==
=== Early years ===
Lydia Gibson was born in 1891, one of three daughters of English-born architect Robert W. Gibson and his wife Caroline Gibson, née Hammond. She grew up in prosperity but seems to have been radicalized in her 20s during the movement for women's suffrage, in which she was an activist. In the latter half of the 1910s, she began contributing her work to The Masses, a literary and artistic magazine with a distinct socialist orientation, published by Max Eastman and his sister Crystal in New York City.

In conjunction with her work with The Masses, Gibson met and worked with many other prominent political artists of the day, including Boardman Robinson, Art Young, Hugo Gellert, and Robert Minor. The anarchist Texan Minor fell in love with Gibson, but she initially declined the advances of the political cartoonist, whom she believed to still have been married.

After the Bolshevik Revolution of November 1917, Minor traveled to Soviet Russia, where he became committed to the communist cause and subsequently foreswore his anarchist beliefs and joined the underground Communist Party of America. In August 1920 Gibson also "changed her mind a little," this over matters of the heart and wrote to Robert Minor, then amorously involved and living with radical journalist Mary Heaton Vorse. Gibson signaled her intentions to Minor and eventually won his returned affection after the two had worked together in the offices of The Liberator in 1922. The two married in 1923.

In 1927, while in Moscow with her husband, who was the delegate of the American Communist Party to the Executive Committee of the Communist International, Gibson assisted "Big Bill" Haywood with the preparation of the first part of his memoirs. Gibson had to leave the Soviet Union before the project was completed, however, and another individual who was a former member of the Industrial Workers of the World, as was Haywood, helped complete the work. Haywood's autobiography was published posthumously in 1929.

In 1934, Gibson wrote and illustrated a children's book, The Teacup Whale, a tale which, while not explicitly radical, invited children to dream big dreams and to challenge the contrary opinions of doubters.

Gibson and Minor remained together until the latter's death of a heart attack in 1952.

=== Later life and death ===
Lydia Gibson remained loyal to the Communist Party even after the revelations of Nikita Khrushchev in 1956. In 1962 she loaned the party $5,000 in US Treasury Bonds to bail out CPUSA General Secretary Gus Hall from jail.

Lydia Gibson died in 1964.

== Works ==
- The Teacup Whale. New York: Farrar and Rinehart, 1934. —Juvenile fiction
