= Letter to American Workers =

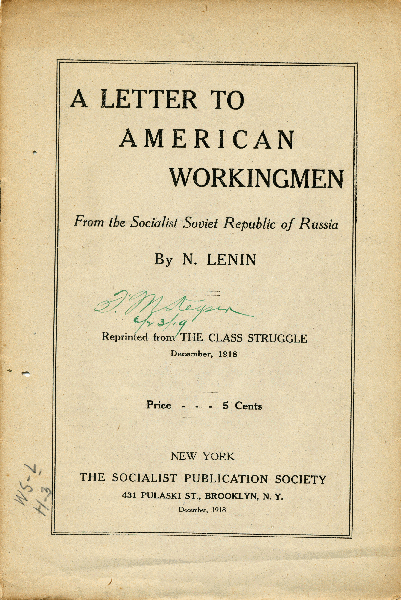
- First page of the English translation
- Language: Russian
- Genre: Essay

A Letter to American Workingmen, or A Letter to American Workers (Письмо к американским рабочим, Pis'mo k amerikanskim rabočim), is an essay by Vladimir Lenin that was written on 20 August 1918.

== History ==
The letter was Lenin's response to a message received from members of the Industrial Workers of the World who were participating in a worker's demonstration in Seattle. That message had been delivered to Russia by the crew of the steamship Shilka. Lenin wrote the letter on 20 August 1918, and it appeared in the Pravda newspaper a few days later on 22 August.

Delivery of Lenin's letter to the United States was entrusted to Mikhail Borodin. The letter, which was printed in multiple copies on thin paper, was carried to the US by several couriers. One of them was the American poet Carl Sandburg, an acquaintance of Borodin, who received the letter in Oslo, along with propaganda materials and a check for 10,000 US dollars, with instructions to deliver them to Chicago. Since Sandburg notified US embassy staff in Oslo before his departure, American authorities confiscated both the propaganda and the check upon arrival in New York City. A copy of the letter, however, was passed to Santeri Nuorteva, an employee of the Russian Information Bureau in the United States. Another copy, sewn into a special belt, was delivered by the engineer P.I. Travin (Sletlov).

In December 1918, an English version of the letter was published in the Boston-based biweekly newspaper The Revolutionary Age, and in the New York-based Socialist Party magazine The Class Struggle. In autumn 1919, Lenin met with Travin, who reported on the delivery and distribution of the letter in America. In 1934, it was reprinted in New York as a separate pamphlet.

=== Lenin's revolutionary characterization of the United States ===
The most cited passage of the letter is Lenin's revolutionary characterization of America:

The history of modern civilized America opens with one of those great, truly liberating, genuinely revolutionary wars, of which there were so few among the mass of predatory wars caused, like the present imperialist war, by struggles among kings, landlords, and capitalists over the division of seized lands or plundered profits. It was a war of the American people against the English brigands, who oppressed and held America in colonial slavery, just as these "civilized" bloodsuckers still oppress and enslave hundreds of millions of people in India, Egypt, and all parts of the world. About 150 years have passed since then. Bourgeois civilization has yielded all its splendid fruits. America has taken first place among free and educated countries in terms of the development of the productive forces of collective human labor, in the use of machinery, and in all the marvels of modern technology. At the same time, America has also become one of the foremost countries in the depth of the abyss separating a handful of insolent billionaires, wallowing in mud and luxury, from millions of workers living perpetually on the brink of poverty.

== Reception ==
- During the entire Soviet period, Lenin's letter was considered an example of a class-based approach to evaluating events, an invaluable contribution to scientific socialism, and an inspiring document for the progressive and peace movements in the United States.
- Historian Goga Abrarovich Hidoyatov noted that the letter "played an important role in changing public opinion in the United States and intensified the mass movement in defense of Soviet Russia".

== In art ==
On the very day the Marat sailed, another issue of Pravda arrived in Vologda with Lenin's article "Letter to American Workingmen." Before departure, Frolov managed, with difficulty and as a great rarity, to obtain a copy of the newspaper. Lenin's article shaped and fused, as metal is poured into a mold, all the thoughts and feelings of the commissar. Excited by this article, he sat in his cabin, oblivious to the shore drifting past the open window.

— Nikolai Nikolaevich Nikitin, Aurora of the North

== See also ==
- Vladimir Lenin bibliography
