= International Publishers =

American Marxist publishing firm since 1924

- Original logo of International Publishers, used from the time of the firm's establishment in 1924 throughout the decade of the 1930s.
- Founded: 1924
- Founder: A. A. Heller; Alexander Trachtenberg
- Country of origin: United States
- Headquarters location: New York City
- Publication types: Books
- Nonfiction topics: Marxism
- Official website: intpubnyc.com

International Publishers is a book publishing company based in New York City, specializing in Marxist works of economics, political science, and history. The firm has long been associated with the Communist Party USA and its predecessors and has worked closely with the party's pamphlet publishing imprints — Daily Worker Publishing Co. (1924–1927), Workers Library Publishers (1927–1945), New Century Publishers (1945–1963), and New Outlook Publishers (1963–2000s).

== Company history ==
=== Establishment ===
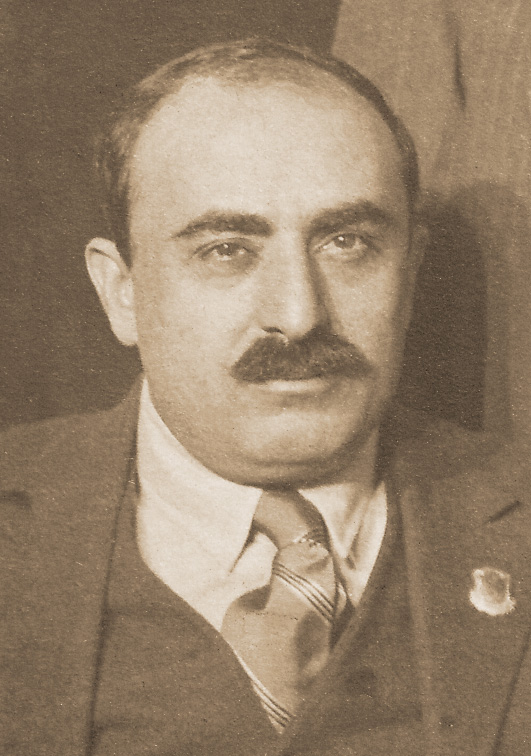
Alexander Trachtenberg in Moscow (Fall 1922)

International Publishers Company, Inc., was founded in 1924 with funds given the project by Abraham A. Heller. Heller was the radical son of a wealthy jeweler doing business in Paris. He expanded his fortune as head of the International Oxygen Company, a welding supply company that operated a trade concession in Soviet Russia during the time of the New Economic Policy in the early 1920s. A lifelong socialist, Heller had previously been a heavy financial donor to the New York Call, the Socialist Party's New York daily newspaper. He had been instrumental in funding the purchase of the headquarters building for the Rand School of Social Science.

The company began with a capital stock of $50,000, paid in by Heller, with the stock subsequently split with Trachtenberg as compensation. Alexander Trachtenberg, a left wing member of the Socialist Party of America associated with the Rand School of Social Science and its publishing house, who joined the Communist movement at the end of 1921, served as manager of International Publishers from its inception through the 1940s.

The law firm for incorporating International Publishers was Hays, St. John & Buckley of 43 Exchange Place, whose partners included Arthur Garfield Hays. According to testimony before the U.S. Congress by Trachtenberg, in addition to his initial $50,000 investment, Heller continually made up losses incurred by International Publishers during its first 15 years. Over that period, his investment climbed to a total of some $115,000.

The idea of forming International Publishers seems to have come from Heller and Trachtenberg. Initial assistance came from the Communist Party (then the Workers Party of America), limited to supplying advice and addresses of radical bookstores around America. In a letter dated June 1924 from the party's head Literature Department, Nicholas Dozenberg cautioned Trachtenberg that Charles H. Kerr & Co. of Chicago had already published many standard titles by Karl Marx, thus limiting the prospects of successful new editions of the same works. Instead, Dozenberg encouraged Trachtenberg to concentrate on "books not yet published in English written by popular Russian writers like Lenin, Zinoviev, Radek, and others."

Initially, International Publishers had official independence from the Communist Party USA (CPUSA). However, it counted the CPUSA's official publishing arm and its New York state literature department, the "Wholesale Book Corporation," among its biggest clients. By 1939, 15 years after its establishment, the publisher was dealing with some 700 bookstores around the country. Among these were some 40–50 bookstores, owned and operated by various district organizations of the Communist Party.

Despite its semi-independent status legally, International Publishers functioned practically as the official US publisher of Communist Party literature. Meanwhile, in 1927 the Party renamed its "Daily Worker Publishing Company" to parallel International Publishers as the "Workers Library Publishers." The Party also limited activity of the Workers Library Publishers largely to the issuance of propaganda pamphlets and the publication of official Party magazines. International Publishers focused on publishing hardcover and paperback books, with only some pamphlet literature (and at a much slower pace). As the decade of the 1930s came to a close, some 90% of International's catalog were titles published in bound book form, only 10% were pamphlets.

=== Development ===
Cover of the 1935 International Publishers annual book catalog.

In the fall of 1935, International Publishers launched a new program called the "Book Union". This was a radical book-buying circle, modeled on the Book of the Month Club. The Book Union first offered an anthology entitled Proletarian Literature in the United States, nearly 400 pages long and edited by current or future editors of The New Masses: Michael Gold, Granville Hicks, Joseph North, and others. The Book Union collected a $1 annual fee from its members, who then received a discounted volume in the mail each month. The Book Union obliged members to buy 2 of 12 selections during the year. Purchase of four books in a year entitled members to a bonus premium. Despite its aggressively low pricing, the Book Union proved less successful than the Left Book Club operated by Victor Gollancz Ltd in England and seems to have been terminated after just a few years.

=== 1939 Dies Committee ===
On September 13, 1939, Trachtenberg was called before the so-called Dies Committee of the US House of Representatives, the Special Committee to Investigate Un-American Activities. Committee members grilled Trachtenberg on his own history, the sources of funding behind International Publishers, and the company's relationship to the CPUSA. He characterized the relationship as merely one of "buyer and seller."

He indicated that International Publishers did not own presses but used the services of a company called Van Rees Press on a contract basis. The firm also exchanged printed sheets for publication with its British sister organization, Lawrence & Wishart, and bought sheets for binding from the forerunner of the official Foreign Languages Publishing House in Moscow. He estimated that some 10% of International Publishers' books had made use of such sources but that a lowering of duty rates on bound books had largely eliminated the economy of importing unbound sheets.

Trachtenberg estimated annual sales by International Publishers at $75,000 to $80,000. He noted that the company had a staff of four.

=== Later years ===
Starting in the 1960s, International Publishers expanded its catalog of inexpensive trade paperback books under the title "New World Paperbacks". A number of titles bore this as an alternative company logo.

James S. Allen wrote an unpublished memoir about his tenure as International Publisher's president and editor-in-chief during the 1960s and '70s. After his death, his manuscript was edited by Peter Meyer Filardo and printed in American Communist History in December 2011. Allen provided a rare inside look at the workings of International Publishers, and recounted a crisis period in 1962 when the firm nearly went bankrupt.

== Important publications ==
International Publishers has been party to the publication of a number of titles of lasting scholarly importance. In the late 1920s, it produced the first English-language editions of works on Marxist theory by Karl Kautsky (Foundations of Christianity, 1925; Are the Jews a Race? 1926; Thomas More and His Utopia, 1927), Leon Trotsky (Literature and Revolution, 1925; Whither England? 1925; Whither Russia? 1926), Nikolai Bukharin (Historical Materialism, 1925, The Economic Theory of the Leisure Class, 1927; Imperialism and World Economy, 1929); and Joseph Stalin (Leninism, 1928).

The company worked with the Marx-Engels-Lenin Institute in Moscow on three separate publishing initiatives involving the works of V.I. Lenin: an aborted Collected Works project begun in 1927; a 12-volume Selected Works project issued 1934-1938 in green bindings; and a revised, 12-volume Selected Works edition published in blue bindings in 1943. International Publishers joined with the Communist Party of Great Britain's publishing house Lawrence and Wishart, and with Progress Publishers (Moscow), to publish the 50-volume Collected Works of Karl Marx and Frederick Engels, a project launched in 1975 and completed in 2004.

International Publishers was an early reissuer of John Reed's chronicle of the Russian Revolution, Ten Days That Shook the World. Originally published by Boni & Liveright in 1919, an International Publishers edition came out in 1926 and — except for a time during the reign of Joseph Stalin, when the book fell out of official favor — it has been a mainstay of the publishing house's catalog ever since.

International Publishers has published autobiographies by many prominent Communists, including ones by William "Big Bill" Haywood (1929), Nadezhda Krupskaya (1930), William Z. Foster (two volumes, 1937 and 1930), Ella Reeve Bloor (1940), Joseph North (1958), W.E.B. Du Bois (1968), Benjamin J. Davis (1969), John Williamson (1969), William L. Patterson (1971), Hosea Hudson (1972), Elizabeth Gurley Flynn (reissue, 1973), Art Shields (two volumes, 1983 and 1986), Gil Green (1984) and Angela Davis (paperback reissue, 1988).

International Publishers produced a series of numbered "International Pamphlets" from 1930 - 1937 under the direction of the Labor Research Association. "Number 1," published in 1930 by Anna Louis Strong, covered "Modern Farming – Soviet Style." Other topics in this pamphlet series included chemical warfare, labor rights, colonialism, imperialism, criminalization of labor activists via "the frame-up system," child labor, racism, lynching, women's labor and intellectual elitism.

International Publishers was a frequent publisher of prolific labor historian Philip S. Foner; among his works are a ten-volume History of the Labor Movement in the United States (1947–1994) and a five-volume collection, The Life and Writings of Frederick Douglass (1950–1975). The company also published books by Herbert Aptheker, a historian specializing in African-American history.

== Partial roster of authors ==
- Herbert Aptheker
- Anthony Bimba
- Earl Browder
- Alice Childress
- Angela Davis
- Horace B. Davis
- W.E.B. Du Bois
- Robert W. Dunn
- Frederick Engels
- Vera Figner
- Sidney Finkelstein
- Elizabeth Gurley Flynn
- Philip S. Foner
- William Z. Foster
- Antonio Gramsci
- Gus Hall
- Jack Hardy
- Grace Hutchins
- V. I. Lenin
- Karl Marx
- Scott Nearing
- Victor Perlo
- William J. Pomeroy
- Mike Quin
- John Reed
- Anna Rochester
- Joseph Stalin
- Charlotte Todes
- Leon Trotsky
- Alden Whitman
- Henry Winston

== See also ==
- Alexander Trachtenberg
- James S. Allen
- Communist Party USA
- Bibliography on American Communism
