= Alexander Trachtenberg =

American publisher

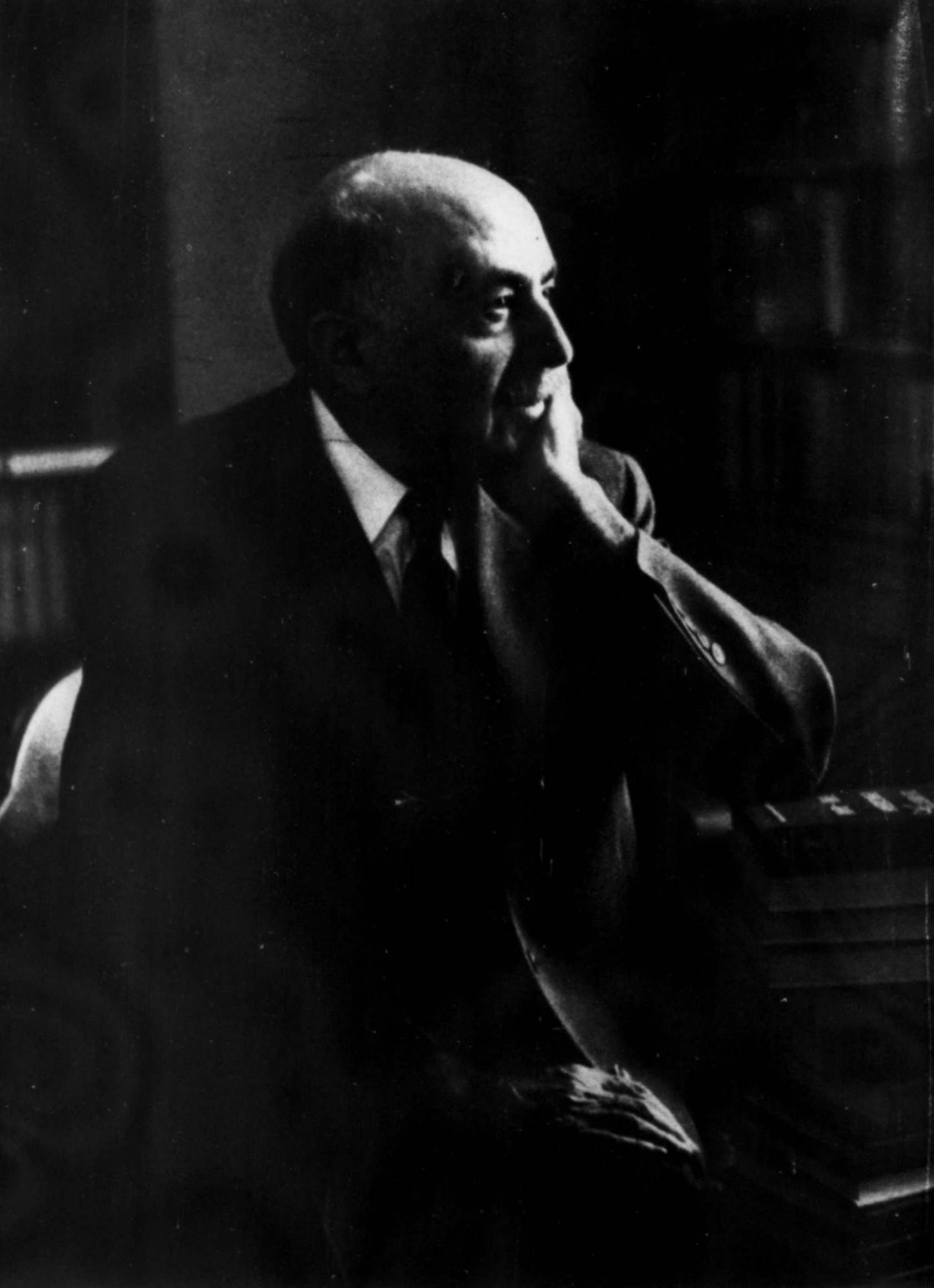
- Trachtenberg c. 1954
- Born: Alexander Leo Trachtenberg; November 23, 1885; Odesa, Kherson Governorate, Russian Empire
- Died: December 16, 1966 (aged 81); New York City, U.S.
- Education: Yale University
- Years active: 1902–1966
- Employer(s): Rand School of Social Science, International Ladies Garment Workers Union, International Publishers
- Notable work: Founding of International Publishers
- Political party: Communist Party USA
- Movement: Communist
- Spouse: Rosalind Kohn

Alexander "Alex" Trachtenberg (November 23, 1884 – December 26, 1966) was an American publisher of radical political books and pamphlets, founder and manager of International Publishers of New York. He was a longtime activist in the Socialist Party of America and later in the Communist Party USA. For more than eight decades, his International Publishers was a part of the publishing arm of the American communist movement. He served as a member of the CPUSA's Central Control Committee. During the period of McCarthyism in America, Trachtenberg was twice subject to prosecution and convicted under the Smith Act; the convictions were overturned, the first by recanting of a government witness and the second by a US Circuit Court of Appeals decision in 1958.

== Biography ==
=== Early years ===
Alexander Leo Trachtenberg, later known to his friends as "Alex" or "Trachty," was born on November 23, 1885, of Jewish parents in the city of Odesa, part of the Pale of Settlement of the Russian Empire.

Trachtenberg joined the radical movement while attending the University of Odessa School of Electrotechnique as an engineering student from 1902 to 1904. During the Russo-Japanese War, he was conscripted into the Russian army. For his service, he earned the Cross of the Order of St. George and rose to the rank of captain.

Soon after his return home in the late summer of 1905, Trachtenberg was arrested and imprisoned by the government for a year, during a period of political dissidents suppression. During the Russian Revolution of 1905, Trachtenberg escaped pogroms against the Jews in 1905 and 1906. Soon after his release in 1906, he joined many other Jews in political emigration to the United States.

Trachtenberg arrived in New York City on August 6, 1906, on a ship from Hamburg, Germany, a major port of departure to the US. From 1908 to 1915, Trachtenberg was a student at three different universities, earning his bachelor's degree from Trinity College in Hartford, Connecticut, in 1911, followed by a master's degree in education from Yale University in 1912. He continued studies in economics at Yale through 1915 and completed a dissertation on safety legislation for the protection of Pennsylvania coal miners, but he did not complete his doctorate. Trachtenberg's dissertation was accepted for publication by the United States Department of Labor in 1917, but delays in preparation of the manuscript and budgetary issues at the department ultimately ended the project. Trachtenberg finally published his manuscript a quarter of a century later through International Publishers, which he co-founded, as The History of Legislation for the Protection of Coal Miners in Pennsylvania, 1824–1915.

Trachtenberg was very active in student affairs, serving as president of the Yale chapter of the Intercollegiate Socialist Society (ISS). During World War I, he took an anti-militarist stance from a socialist rather than a pacifist perspective. He joined the Collegiate Anti-Militarism League at Columbia University in 1915, served as treasurer, and contributed to an anti-war petition to President Wilson after the sinking of the Lusitania.

Trachtenberg left Yale in 1915 to work as an administrator and teacher of Economics and Labor at the Rand School of Social Science, founded by the Socialist Party in New York. Trachtenberg directed the school's Department of Labor Research, which conducted studies for other organizations and gathered and published labor statistics. He edited various Rand publications, including the first four volumes of the Rand School's encyclopedic American Labor Year Book, as well as a controversial 1917 defense of the Socialist Party's anti-militarist perspective, American Socialists and the War. Trachtenberg continued to oppose the war even after the United States entry into the conflict on the side of the Allies in April 1917.

In June 1920, the International Ladies Garment Workers Union (ILGWU) hired Trachtenberg as an economist.

Trachtenberg was the de facto treasurer of the Workers' Council group, briefly an independent organization in 1921 before joining the Workers Party of America at the end of the year.

=== Political career ===
Up to the Russian Revolution in 1917, Trachtenberg had adhered to the left wing of the Socialist Party of America (SPA). Trachtenberg embraced the Bolshevik Revolution of November 1917, but did not leave the Socialist Party in the summer of 1919 when the Communist movement in America was started. Instead, he remained with the SPA together with journalist J. Louis Engdahl and youth leader William F. Kruse, attempting to align the organization with the Communist International.

Federal investigations into Trachtenberg's activities date to the period of the so-called "Palmer Raids" of 1920, following a series of bombings. The Bureau of Investigations (now the FBI) had an informant, Abraham Goodman, who worked as the bookkeeper for Trachtenberg's company, Chatham Printing Co. Goodman reported to the BoI that Trachtenberg had printed a leaflet for the Communist Labor Party in the Ukrainian language.

In 1921, Trachtenberg, Kruse, and Engdahl helped form the Committee for the Third International inside the Socialist Party, later splitting as an independent organization known as the Workers' Council. The Workers' Council published a small biweekly magazine, The Workers' Council, starting in April and running to December 1921. Trachtenberg served as the chairman of the Finance Committee of the group. The underground Communist Party was being pushed toward open activity by pressure of the Communist International. At the end of 1921, the Worker's Council joined with the Finnish Socialist Federation and the underground communists to help establish a new, so-called "Legal Political Party," the Workers Party of America.

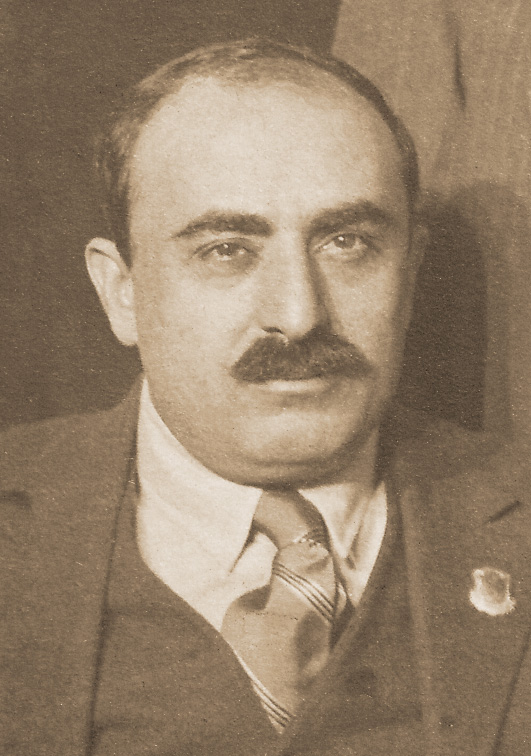
Trachtenberg at 4th World Congress of the Communist International in Moscow, 1922

At the founding convention of the WPA in December 1921, Trachtenberg was elected to serve on the Central Executive Committee of the new organization. At the 2nd Convention of December 1922, Trachtenberg was re-elected to the same role. Trachtenberg was chosen as a delegate of the Workers Party of America to the 4th World Congress of the Comintern, held in Moscow in the fall of 1922. With his official enrollment in the communist movement, in 1922 Trachtenberg resigned from the Rand School of Social Science.

During the bitter inner-party conflict of the 1920s, Trachtenberg was a supporter of the New York-based faction headed by John Pepper, C. E. Ruthenberg, and Jay Lovestone. He was returned to the governing Central Executive Committee by the 5th Convention of September 1927, at which Jay Lovestone was elected Executive Secretary. At the 6th National Convention of March 1929, when Benjamin Gitlow became executive secretary, Trachtenberg was elected as an alternate member of the committee.

Throughout the decade of the 1920s, Trachtenberg was frequently a candidate for elective public office. In 1920 he stood as a candidate of the Socialist Party for New York State Assembly in the state's 12th District. In 1924, he ran for Congress on behalf of the Workers Party in the New York 10th District, running for the same office for the Communist Party in the New York 14th District in 1926, 1928, and 1930, after the Stock Market Crash.

When Whittaker Chambers gave Adolf Berle his account of Soviet espionage in the Roosevelt Administration, he identified Trachtenberg as "member of the Exec. Committee [CPUSA], Head of GPU in U.S., Works with Peters"

=== International Publishers ===
Trachtenberg led the Party's cultural efforts, particularly publication and distribution of materials. In his memoirs, Whittaker Chambers summarized the activist's career by 1952 as follows:

Alexander Trachtenberg who, as head of International Publishers, was the party's "cultural commissar" and had the New Masses and the John Reed Clubs under his wing, and, as an old Bolshevik (he was said to be a former Tsarist cavalry officer and a doctor of philosophy from Yale), was a member of the Central Control Commission.

Trachtenberg founded International Publishers in June 1924. Incorporated on July 17, 1924, the firm was a business enterprise which he co-owned. Financiers included Abraham A. Heller, who invested more than $100,000 for its first 15 years. A third shareholder was Heller's wife Edith, who later sold out to the other two, making them equal shareholders. On December 26, 1924, the firm's name changed from "International Publishers & Booksellers, Inc." to "International Publishers Co., Inc." Trachtenberg served in multiple roles as treasurer, manager, editor, and salesman.

International Publishers published Marxist–Leninist works. Trachtenberg gained support from Nicholas Dozenberg, head of the Workers Party's Literature Department. He also contacted Charles Ruthenberg, then executive secretary of the Party, to express his intention not to compete but to support the Party's own publications. To political texts, International Publishers added literary and academic works that appealed not just to the working class but also to progressives.

Researcher David Lincove has characterized books and pamphlets published by International Publishers under Trachtenberg as having a "utilitarian, academic, or inexpensive format," though occasionally "illustrations reinforced proletarian themes." He noted that "color images appeared on book covers, and occasionally the publisher added interior photographs or artistic drawings and illustrations by artists such as William Siegel, Hugo Gellert, and Esther Shemitz (future wife of Whittaker Chambers)." The firm also published hardback series (e.g., 37 volumes of the "Marxist Library") for libraries and schools. Lincove described the publisher's colophon as a "distinctive logo depicting an upright, shirt-less laborer grasping an oversized book, thus emphasizing the importance of books and ideas in the class struggle."

International Publishers had gross sales increase from some $10,000 in the mid-1920s to $75,000 in the late 1930s, during the Great Depression. Pamphlets cost up to $1, books up to $3. Of the firm's own titles, 80% were exported, of which 80% went to the Soviet Union. Inside the U.S., International Publishers sold to bookstores, universities, libraries, and schools. Half or more of domestic sales occurred directly in New York.

The Soviet Union clarified the responsibilities of writers in the communist movement at the Second World Plenum of the International Bureau of Revolutionary Literature held in Kharkov on November 6–15, 1930. The Comintern instructed the CPUSA to enlist writers into their ranks to work for the revolution. John Reed Clubs, initiated in 1929 by editors of the New Masses, were redirected to the Black community.

Trachtenberg led the first meeting of the newly formed American Artists' Congress in the art studio of Eitaro Ishigaki on May 18, 1935. Some 20 artists attended. This group, replacing the John Reed Club and its many chapters nationwide, operated within the Popular Front but was organized by the CPUSA. Members included Joseph Freeman, Mike Gold, and party secretary Earl Browder. The Party also organized the League of American Writers, whose members include Nelson Algren, Langston Hughes, Kenneth Burke, and Erskine Caldwell. On May 1, 1935, Trachtenberg joined the League of American Writers (1935–1943), whose members included Lillian Hellman, Dashiell Hammett, Frank Folsom, Louis Untermeyer, I.F. Stone, Myra Page, Millen Brand, Clifford Odets, and Arthur Miller. (Members were largely either Communist Party members or fellow travelers.)

With the social upheaval and economic distress of millions during the Depression, many people were searching for solutions in alternatives to American capitalism.

In the fall of 1935, Trachtenberg was instrumental in helping to create the "Book Union" — a radical book-buying circle based upon the model of the Book of the Month Club. The first offering of the Book Union was an anthology entitled Proletarian Literature in the United States, a thick volume of nearly 400 pages edited by Michael Gold, Granville Hicks, Joseph North, and others. The Book Union collected a $1 annual fee from its members, who received a volume in the mail each month priced at a discount, with members obligated to buy 2 of the 12 club's selections during the year. After the purchase of four books in a year, members were to receive a bonus premium. The International Publishers "Book Union" did not prove to be as successful as a similar "Left Book Club" operated by Victor Gollancz Ltd in England, however. It appears to have been ended after just a few years.

=== Jacob Golos ===
According to a 1948 issue of Counterattack (newsletter), Trachtenberg helped Jacob Golos (who later recruited and ran Elizabeth Bentley) establish World Tourists, a Communist Party front. Counterattack further claimed that World Tourists served "in part for spying from its very outset." Also, the newsletter claimed that Golos made it profitable.

In the same issue, Counterattack also claimed that both Trachtenberg and Golos were members of a Communist Party "Control Commission," renamed "National Review Commission" by 1945.

=== Dies Committee testimony ===
Trachtenberg was subpoenaed and appeared before the Dies Committee on September 13, 1939. Proclaiming his support for Communism, he described the revenues, production, and sales (see previous section, above). He described his firm's relationship between with the CPUSA as "business." However, Trachtenberg also served on the board of "Workers Library Publishers" (1928–1945, replaced by New Century Publishers), which published CPUSA literature. Perhaps the most famous publication by the Workers Library Publishers was The Communist Party: Manual of Organization (1935) by J. Peters. Research based on documents in the Russian archives opened after the fall of the Soviet Union showed either direct Soviet funding or indirect funding through the CPUSA.

In addition to discussing the economics of International Publishers, Trachtenberg also told Congress that throughout the decade of the 1930s he had been the Treasurer of World Tourists, Inc. This Party-affiliated travel agency coordinated tours of Americans to the Soviet Union. As part of this job, Trachtenberg countersigned all checks prepared by Jacob Golos. In the 21st century, Golos is known to have been closely tied to the secret Soviet foreign intelligence apparatus in America during these years. Trachtenberg told Congress that he received payment from World Tourists for his services for only about one year, either in 1936 or 1937.

During the 1940s, the FBI continued to monitor Trachtenberg. It infiltrated International Publishers with informants.

=== McCarthy period prosecutions ===
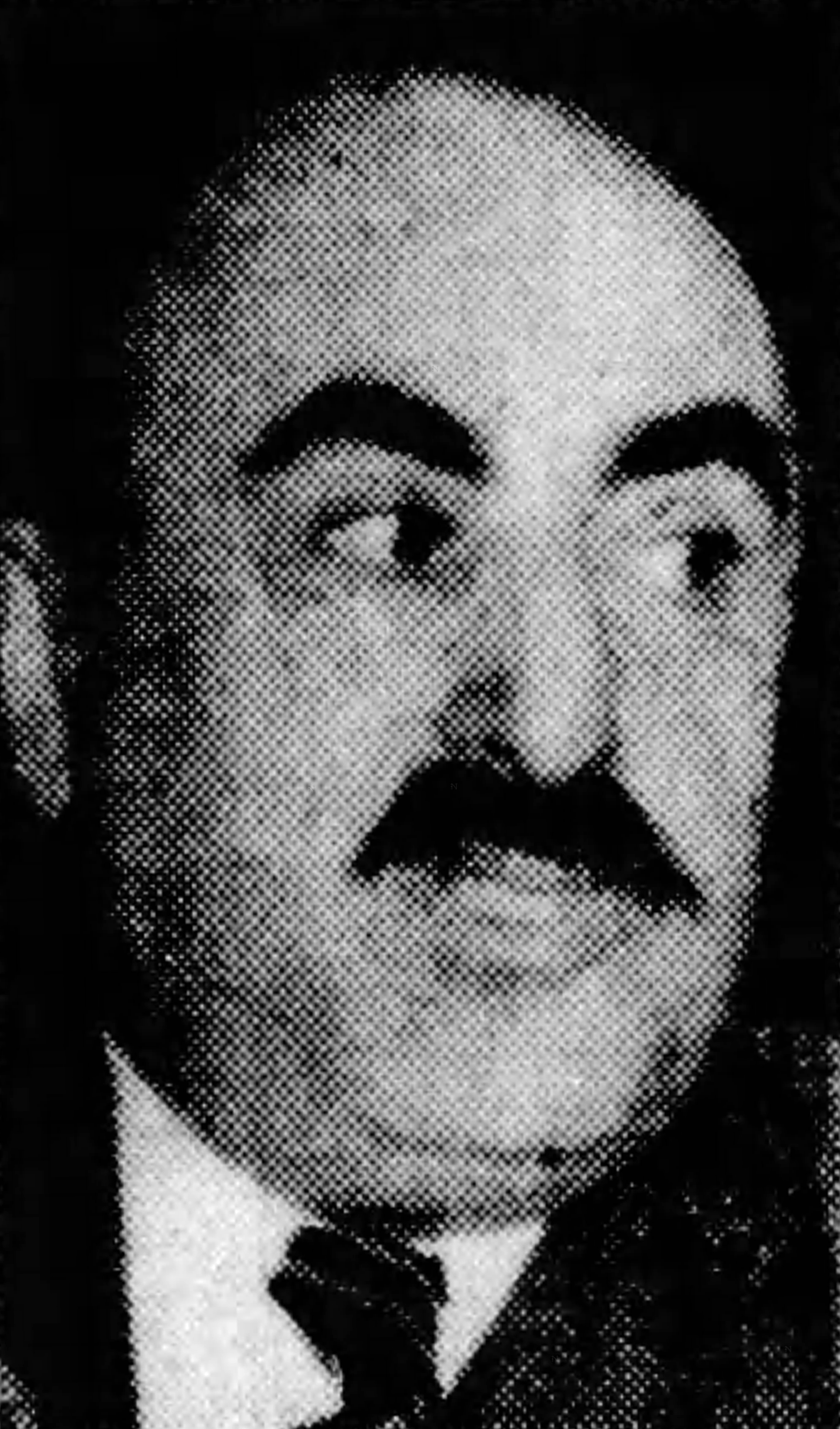
Trachtenberg c. 1951

In 1952, during the McCarthy years, Trachtenberg faced prosecution in Federal court, based on activities at International Publishers, teachings in communist-led schools, and previous writings supporting communist revolution in the U.S.

International Publishers published two pamphlets in Trachtenberg's support: Books on Trial: The Case of Alexander Trachtenberg and Publisher on Trial: The Case of Alexander Trachtenberg, A Symposium (both 1952). Symposium contributors included Howard Fast, writer of the screenplay for Spartacus (film). He wrote about Trachtenberg's case:

The indictment has a singularity as exercised toward him. Both the man and the books he has published are on trial... The books... go beyond the man himself... a body of Marxist-Leninist literature surpassed in few countries indeed... made available to the American people because this man has known neither fear nor pessimism, and has again and again surmounted obstacles almost insurmountable... Some day history will properly weigh and assess the role these books played.

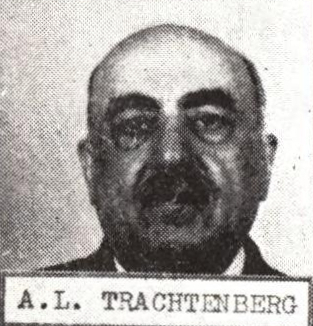
Trachtenberg's FBI mugshot, 1951

Trachtenberg was convicted on February 2, 1953, for violating the Smith Act. At his sentencing, he criticized the selective examination of his firm's publications, rather than their overall history. He served three months in prison. The verdict was overturned when government witness Harvey Matusow recanted.

In 1956, Trachtenberg was convicted for a second time in Federal court and sentenced to one year in prison. In 1958, the US Circuit Court of Appeals voided the conviction based on Supreme Court case Yates v. United States.

=== Later years ===
Trachtenberg retired from International Publishers in 1962. His successor, James S. Allen, continued to reprint classics (e.g., three volumes of Lenin's Selected Works in 1967 in a "New World Paperbacks" series). The firm continued to publish the classical works of Karl Marx, Friedrich Engels, and Lenin. It ceased to publish books by leaders who had fallen out of favor, such as Nikolai Bukharin, Leon Trotsky, and Joseph Stalin. In 1975, Lou Diskin took over the firm.

== Death ==
Trachtenberg married Rosalind Kohn; they chose to have no children.

Alexander Trachtenberg died age 81 on December 16, 1966, in New York of a stroke. He was survived by his wife.

== Legacy ==
As of 2024, International Publishers continues in active operation. It remains closely affiliated with the CPUSA and maintains an office in New York City.

== Works ==
=== Books and pamphlets ===
- American Socialists and the War: A Documentary History of the Attitude of the Socialist Party toward War and Militarism since the Outbreak of the Great War, New York: Rand School of Social Science, 1917.
- The American Labor Year Book, 1919–1920. Editor. New York: Rand School of Social Science, 1920.
- The American Labor Year Book, 1921–1922. Editor. New York: Rand School of Social Science, 1922.
- The Heritage of Gene Debs. New York: International Publishers, 1930.
- History of May Day. New York: International Pamphlets, 1947. (revised edition)
- The History of Legislation for the Protection of Coal Miners in Pennsylvania, 1824–1915. New York: International Publishers, 1942.
- The Lessons of the Paris Commune New York: International Publishers, 1934.

=== Articles ===
- "The Marx-Engels Institute", in The Liberator, Issue 13: November 1924, v. 5, no. 1 (1924)
- "1905 – The Rehearsal for 1917", in The Liberator, Issue 14: December 1925, v. 5, no. 2 (1925)
- "Marx, Engels and Lenin on the Paris Commune", in The Liberator, Issue 17: March 1926, v. 5, no. 5 (1926)
- "Marx, Lenin and the Commune", in Theoretical Magazine for the Discussion of Revolutionary Problems (Workers Party of America, 1928, volume vii, March 1928, number 3, edited by Bertram Wolfe)
- "Publishing Revolutionary Literature," in American Writers’ Congress, edited by Henry Hart (1935)

== See also ==
- International Publishers
- Communist Party USA
- Rand School of Social Science
- Tamiment Library
