= Friends of Soviet Russia =

Former American mass organization & publisher of "Soviet Russia Today"

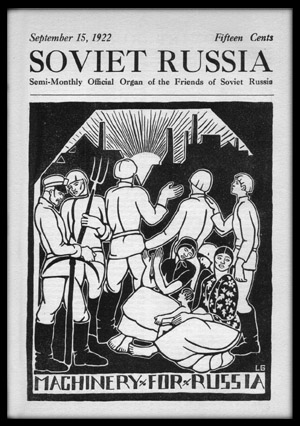
Soviet Russia was the official magazine of the Friends of Soviet Russia. Cover art by Lydia Gibson.

The Friends of Soviet Russia (FSR) was formally established in the United States on August 9, 1921 as an offshoot of the American Labor Alliance for Trade Relations with Soviet Russia (ALA). It was launched as a "mass organization" dedicated to raising funds for the relief of the extreme famine that swept Soviet Russia in 1921, both in terms of food and clothing for immediate amelioration of the crisis and agricultural tools and equipment for the reconstruction of Soviet agriculture.

From 1927 the organization was known as the Friends of the Soviet Union (FSU) and was the American national affiliate of a new international authority known as the International Association of Friends of the Soviet Union.

== Organizational History ==
=== Early work ===
The Friends of Soviet Russia proved successful in raising funds for Russian relief, generating about $750,000 and clothing worth an additional $300,000 during the first 14 months of its existence. The funds were raised transparently, with the name of each donor and the amount given published in each issue of Soviet Russia; detailed lists of expenditures, regularly audited, were also published. In round numbers, about 25% of the group's income went to administration and the costs of fundraising with the balance to relief.

The FSR was the American division of Workers International Relief, an international organization headed by the German Communist Willy Münzenberg. Membership in the FSR was open without regard to an individual's politics, but the organizational apparatus was tightly controlled by dedicated adherents of the Communist movement. In the documents of the underground Communist Party of the day, the ALA was referred to as "the A" and the FSR (or "Fessar") as "the B."

The FSR published a program in December 1922 which listed the group's aims: (1) to advocate the extension of credits to and recognition of the Soviet government; (2) to raise and distribute funds for clothing and food for the needy of Soviet Russia, to be distributed via the Soviet government "regardless of their political opinions"; (3) to agitate and demonstrate for non-intervention in the affairs of the Russian people in determining their form of government; (4) to raise funds for tools for the reconstruction of Soviet industry; and (5) to disseminate "truthful news" about Soviet Russia and build sympathetic sentiment.

=== Structure and relations with other organizations ===
The FSR was structured around over 200 organized branches around the country, which raised funds to support the relief effort and the organization directing it. It maintained an office in New York and a paid staff of about 40 "organizers", members of the Workers Party of America (WPA), some of whom were engaged to travel the country speaking on behalf of the organization and engaging in politics "in their free time." In this sense, the FSR subsidized WPA activity by providing paid employment for some of its leading cadres.

This structure drew the ire of the opponents of the WPA, particularly Abraham Cahan, editor of the Socialist Party-affiliated Yiddish daily The Jewish Daily Forward, which began making charges of irregularity and extravagance in the handling of funds on the part of FSR in editorials and news stories in the summer of 1922. In response to these charges, the FSR appointed an "Investigating Committee of Five", including Roger N. Baldwin of the ACLU, Norman Thomas of the League for Industrial Democracy, Robert Morss Lovett of the liberal magazine The New Republic, Timothy Healy of the Stationary Fireman's Union, and attorney Walter Nelles. While the last-mention later recused himself to avoid possible charges of conflict of interest, the other four members of the committee issued a report at the end of October 1922 essentially clearing the FSR of wrongdoing and attributing the charges against the group to "factional interests."

=== Publications ===
The organ of the FSR was the magazine Soviet Russia, a plain-paper magazine which had originated as the journal of the Russian Soviet Government Bureau (RSGB), headed by Ludwig Martens in New York in 1919. The Martens Bureau had first sent out 13 issues of a weekly news sheet called The Weekly Bulletin of the Bureau of Information of The Soviet Union, intended as a sort of news service for the used of other periodicals but had decided to issue its own magazine starting June 7, 1919. The RSGB stated that its new official magazine "is published in order to acquaint the people of the United States with the real conditions in russia and to combat the campaign of deliberate misrepresentation which is being waged by enemies of the Russian workers..."

As the government of Soviet Russia was not recognized by the government of the United States, Martens was forced to shut down his bureau and leave the country in 1920. To some extent, Friends of Soviet Russia seems to have emerged as a publishing unit to keep this magazine alive. The group had a more important function, however, that being the raising of funds for relief of the devastating famine in Soviet Russia in 1921. The group briefly issued and additional typeset newsletter in conjunction with this effort, Russian Famine Relief Bulletin, although Soviet Russia rapidly absorbed this auxiliary publication's function.

From its earliest days Soviet Russia magazine was essentially a Communist publication, regularly printing articles by Soviet leaders such as Zinoviev, Trotsky, and Radek about matters of Soviet internal policy and foreign relations. The magazine covered the Russian Civil War and post-war diplomatic relations, economic reconstruction in Russia, and domestic political affairs, such as the show trial of the leaders of the Socialist-Revolutionary Party in 1922. This magazine was a bi-weekly for most of the time it was under FSR auspices, switching over to a monthly publication schedule under editor Eugene Lyons in December 1922. Effective with the January 1923 issue, the magazine moved to glossy paper with a new name — Soviet Russia Pictorial.

In late 1923 and 1924, in response to the economic chaos in Germany, in particular among the German working class following the failure of the October 1923 revolution, the FSR changed its name (briefly) to "the Friends of Soviet Russia and Workers' Germany" in an effort to increase its fundraising appeal. This interlude proved brief, and the group was not long in reverting to its original name.

Near the end of 1924 the magazine was merged with the CP's arts-and-theory magazine, The Liberator, and the Trade Union Educational League's monthly organ, The Labor Herald, to form The Workers Monthly in a 3-for-1 combination. This merger was probably driven by the financial concerns of the WPA and clearly underlines the connection of the FSR to the organized American Communist movement.

=== Friends of the Soviet Union ===
In November 1927 the Communist International established the International Association of Friends of the Soviet Union as a new central authority for the various national Soviet Friendship Societies which had been established around the world. In tandem with the move to this new central authority, names of the friendship societies (including the American) were standardized under the name Friends of the Soviet Union (FSU). The FSU continued forward as the publisher of a pictorial monthly magazine Soviet Russia Today.

== See also ==
- Workers International Relief (Mezhrabpom)

== Publications ==
- The Weekly Bulletin of the Bureau of Information of Soviet Russia. New York: Russian Soviet Government Bureau, March 3 to May 26, 1919. — Weekly newspaper. Full run included on CPUSA-Comintern Archives microfilm, IDC Publishers, Reel 1. RGASPI f. 515, op. 1, d. 14.
- Russian Famine Relief Bulletin. New York: Friends of Soviet Russia, from Nov. 15, 1921. — Typeset newsletter, brief run.
- Soviet Russia. New York: RSGB, later Friends of Soviet Russia, June 7, 1919 to Dec. 1922. — Weekly plain paper magazine, later semi-monthly.
  - Volume 1: June-December 1919.
  - Volume 2: January-June 1920.
  - Volume 3: July–December 1920.
  - Volumes 4-5: January-December 1921.
  - Volumes 6-7: January-December 1922.
- Soviet Russia Pictorial. New York: Friends of Soviet Russia, Jan. 1923 to Oct. 1924. — Illustrated monthly magazine. Master microfilm: New York Public Library. OCLC: 11941552
- Soviet Russia Today. New York: Friends of the Soviet Union, 1932 to Jan. 1951. — Glossy magazine.
