= Charlotte Todes =

American labor union organizer (1887–1996)

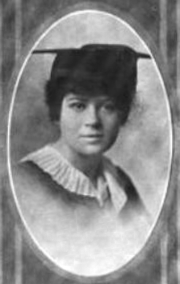
- Todes in graduation regalia from Radcliffe College, 1917.
- Born: Charlotte Todes; May 5, 1897
- Died: November 15, 1996 (aged 99)
- Education: Radcliffe College (BA)
- Years active: 1923-1950
- Known for: Labor organizing

Charlotte Todes Stern (1897–1996) was an American labor union organizer, educator, Communist activist, and social worker. The majority of her personal papers are currently held at the Tamiment Library and Robert F. Wagner Archives at New York University, New York.

== Early life and education ==
Todes was born to Russian-Jewish working-class immigrants in Haverhill, Massachusetts. She attended the Girls Latin School in Boston before attending Radcliffe College, where she majored in social ethics and economics. During her time as a college student, she became associated with the Socialist Club and the Young People's Socialist League. After graduating 1917, she moved to East Boston to work as a social worker. In 1923, she started working at the Workers Health Bureau (WHB) in New York, alongside Grace Burnham and Harriet Silverman. During this time, she met Bernhard J. Stern, the organization secretary of the WHB, and they were subsequently married.

== Career ==
In 1927, she moved to Seattle and worked as the secretary for the local chapter of the International Labor Defense organization. For the ILD, she campaigned under the Centralia Liberation Committee to release ten imprisoned Industrial Workers of the World (IWW) activists, who had been jailed since 1919 for murder. Around 1929, she returned to New York. There, she birthed her daughter, Mira, and worked for various causes, including publishing a book, Lumber and Labor (1931) and a pamphlet, The Injunction Menace (1932). She also served as an editor for The Worker and taught at the Workers and the Jefferson Schools.

From 1936 to 1937, she served as an organizer for the Hairdressers and Cosmetologists Local 560B union. Later, she served as education director for the United Office and Professional Workers of America (1938–1939) and Local 6's Hotel and Club Employees Union (1941). In 1944, she started serving as Local 6's "member" on the Joint Anti-Fascist Refugee Committee Executive Board.

== Bibliography of published works ==
- William H. Sylvis and the National Labor Union (1942)
- Lumber and Labor (1932)
- The Injunction Menace (1931)

== McCarthyism and incarceration ==
In 1947, the Joint Anti-Fascist Refugee Committee was accused of being a front for members of the Communist Party. Stern and her husband were both brought before the Senator McCarthy's Committee on Un-American Activities, where she was one of 25 authors who defied the committee, causing her to receive a jail sentence. Other members of the Joint Anti-Fascist Refugee Committee were also incarcerated. Stern served three months in jail, from June to August in 1950, and her books were banned in the United States. After her release, she lost her job with Local 6 after leadership experienced changes in political affiliation.
