= Santeri Nuorteva =

Finnish politician (1881–1929)

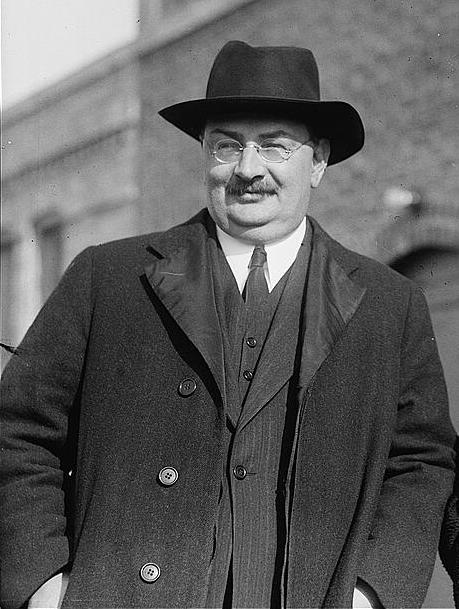
Nuorteva in 1920

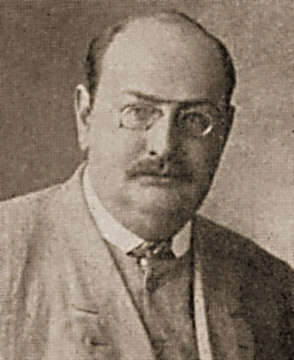
Santeri Nuorteva as he appeared in 1911, when he emigrated to the United States

Santeri "Santtu" Nuorteva (born Alexander Nyberg; 29 June 1881 – 31 March 1929) was a Finnish-born Soviet journalist and one of the first members of the Finnish Parliament, where he served as a member of the Social Democratic Party from 1907 to 1908 and 1909 to 1910. Nuorteva emigrated to the United States in 1911 and played a leading role in the sizable Finnish-language socialist movement in America. At various times, he edited the magazines Säkeniä ("The Spark") and the newspapers Toveri ("The Comrade") and Raivaaja ("The Pioneer"). He was the official spokesman in America for the Finnish Socialist Revolutionary government of 1918 and, after its overthrow, was influential in the official affairs of the government of Soviet Russia in the United States. In 1920, he was deported to Soviet Russia.

His daughter was the famous Finnish-Soviet spy Kerttu Nuorteva.

== Early life ==
Santeri was named Alexander Nyberg when he was born in Viipuri, Grand Duchy of Finland, on June 29, 1881. His father, Claes Fredrik Nyberg, was a telegraph officer and his mother was the Russian Jewish-born Anna Aleksandrovna Saharova. Even before graduating from high school, Santeri had been working in a shop and as a seaman and boilerman. After graduating high school in 1904, he started to work as a teacher and journalist in Forssa. He was a language teacher at the Forssa primary school in 1904 to 1907 and editor of the Forssa News in 1904 to 1906.

After leaving Forssa, Nuorteva worked as journalist for the magazine Socialist in Turku in 1908 and then as editor of the magazine Kansan in Tampere in 1909 to 1911. Nuorteva was imprisoned for lèse majesté in 1909.

== Political career ==
Nyberg fennicized his name to Santeri Nuorteva in 1906, during the period of the Revolution of 1905 in the Russian Empire, which included Finland. He became a member of the Finnish Parliament in 1907 and served there until 1910.

Nuorteva immigrated to the United States in 1911, where he instantly became a leading member of the Finnish Socialist Federation in America and one of its most prominent spokesmen. He worked as editor of the daily newspaper Toveri ("The Comrade") in Astoria, Oregon, in the Pacific Northwest from 1912 to 1913. He left for the East coast to edit the monthly magazine Säkeniä ("The Spark") and worked on the editorial staff of Raivaaja ("The Pioneer").

During the Finnish Civil War, Nuorteva was the chargé d'affaires of the Finnish Socialist Workers' Republic in Washington, DC, in 1918 to 1919. On May 10, 1918, when the government that Nuorteva represented had been overthrown, an audience of socialists filled New York City's Carnegie Hall to hear him denounce the Finnish anti-Bolsheviks as allies of the German Junker class and not friends of America and its allies, as they claimed. Implicitly defending the recent Treaty of Brest-Litovsk, which marked Soviet Russia's exit from the war against Germany, he hailed the Bolshevik Revolution in Russia as the greatest threat to Germany: "Today the Socialist Republic flag of Russia floats over a Socialist embassy in Berlin, a terrible symbol of the greatest menace to the German rulers, for this flag represents the power of a great popular idea that involves the complete destruction of kaiserism and junkerdom and all their works." He campaigned for US diplomatic recognition of the Soviet government.

On September 21, 1918, the New York Evening Post charged that he was the author and fabricator of the Sisson Documents, a controversial set of Russian-language papers that, if genuine, proved that the German General Staff had financed the Russian Revolution and that both Lenin and Trotsky were German agents. Eventually, he became the information chief of the Russian Information Bureau, the de facto embassy of the Russian government, in 1919 to 1920, as assistant to Ludwig Martens, the unrecognized Soviet ambassador and a controversial figure in America.

In 1918, he also collaborated on a translation into English of Lenin's "Letter to American Workers."

In 1920, Nuorteva left the United States by traveling first to Canada and then to England, where he was deported after 10 days to Soviet Russia, the destination that he requested, rather than a return to the US.

== Soviet years ==
Back in Soviet Russia, Nuorteva was made the head of the Anglo-American Division of the People's Commissariat of Foreign Affairs.

In the Soviet Union, Nuorteva was again briefly arrested and jailed in 1921 to 1922. After his release, he worked as the manager in the Karelian Autonomous Soviet Socialist Republic in Petroskoi in 1922.

After he returned to Moscow, Nuorteva worked as a journalist and as the commissar of Anglo-American department in Moscow in 1923 to 1924, when Rosta, the Soviet news agency, sent Nuorteva for a short time to Stockholm as its representative. After working there, Nuorteva became the chairman of the Soviet Karelian Central Committee in 1924 to 1927.

== Death and legacy ==
Nuorteva died on March 31, 1929, in Leningrad while he worked for the editor of the Soviet dictionary.

== See also ==
- Finnish Socialist Federation
- Socialist Party of Oregon
