= Ludwig Martens =

Soviet diplomat (1875–1948)

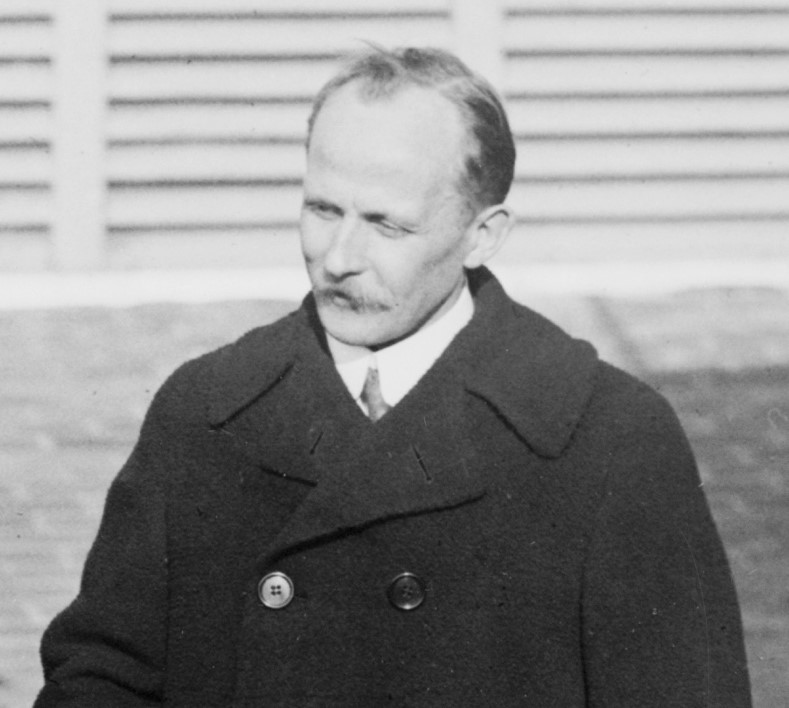
Martens in 1920

Ludwig Christian Alexander Karl Martens (or Ludwig Karlovich Martens; Russian: Людвиг Карлович Мартенс; 1 January 1875 [O.S. 20 December 1874] – 19 October 1948) was a Russian Marxist revolutionary, Soviet diplomat, and engineer.

== Early years ==
Ludwig Martens was born on 1 January 1875 [O.S. 20 December 1874] in Bachmut, in the Yekaterinoslav Governorate in the south of the Russian Empire (present-day Ukraine). Ludwig's father, a German-born industrialist named Karl Gustav Adolf Martens, was the owner of a steel mill in Kursk, Russia. There were five sons and two daughters in the family. Two of them, Ludwig and Olga, became professional revolutionaries.

In 1893, Martens graduated from a Kursk Realschule and entered Saint Petersburg State Institute of Technology, from which he graduated to become a mechanical engineer.

He was fluent in English, German, French, and Russian.

== Political career ==
While at the State Institute of Technology, Martens became acquainted with Vladimir Lenin and Julius Martov. Soon he became a member of their illegal Marxist group League of Struggle for the Emancipation of the Working Class.

In 1896, he was arrested and imprisoned for three years. In 1899, as he was thought to be a German national, he was exiled to Germany, where he became a member of the Social Democratic Party of Germany and was forced into the German Army. In 1902, he graduated from the Technische Hochschule in Charlottenburg (now Technische Universität Berlin). In 1905, he fled from Germany to Switzerland, where he supported Lenin as an aide and ensured that pamphlets and explosives were smuggled into Russia.

In 1906, following the failure of the 1905 Russian Revolution, Martens emigrated to Great Britain and secretly established a machine gun factory for Lenin. Martens worked as a procurement agent for the Demidov Iron and Steel Works, purchasing machinery for the large industrial works, one of the largest steel works in Russia. In 1914, he declared himself a German alien and left for New York after British intelligence began surveillance of him.

In New York as an engineer, he worked for an import-export business and became close to other similarly politically minded persons to spread Lenin's work and ideas.

In 1915, with the onset of World War I, the Kursk steel mill owned by Martens' family was confiscated by the Russian government because the Martens family were considered German nationals. In 1916, Martens emigrated to the United States where he worked as a vice president of the engineering firm Weinberg & Posner (New York City).

In 1917, after the February Revolution, Martens – together with Leon Trotsky and 278 other Russian Social Democrats – returned from the United States to Russia on a steamship.

In March 1919, to break the embargo against Russia, Martens returned to the United States and founded the Russian Soviet Government Bureau at 110 West 40th Street, an informal embassy of Soviet Russia in opposition to the prerevolutionary Imperial Russian Embassy located in Washington, D.C., which the United States still recognized. On 19 March, 1919, as de facto Ambassador from Soviet Russia, he presented diplomatic credentials from People's Commissar for Foreign Affairs Georgy Chicherin to the U.S. State Department. On behalf of the Soviet Russian government, Martens was to settle legal claims, disperse funds, and seize the Imperial Russian Embassy and consulates, which were still occupied by the Russian Provisional Government. He established commercial contacts (formally illegal as the USA boycotted Soviet Russia at the time) with more than 1,000 American firms, including the Morgan Guaranty Trust Company of J. P. Morgan. He negotiated a loan with the then Irish Emissary to the United States, T.D. Harry Boland, using Russian jewels as security. As the Soviet Bureau's administrative head, commercial attaché, and financial advisor, Julius Hammer, father of Armand Hammer, was assigned to generate support for the Russian Soviet Government Bureau and funded the Bureau by money laundering the proceeds from illegal sales of smuggled diamonds through his company Allied Drug.

In June 1919, under pressure from the Lusk Committee, the Bureau was searched by police.

In response to charges by the United States Department of Justice, Martens stated in Washington, D.C., on 10 January, 1920, that he had done nothing to justify being deported. “My activities in the United States have been entirely friendly and along commercial lines,” he said. After hearings in the United States Senate and the United States Department of Labor, Martens was finally deported to Soviet Russia in January 1921.

== Return to Russia ==
After returning to Russia, Martens became a member of the Supreme Soviet of the National Economy and the Chairman of Glavmetal (a state organization holding all the metallurgical enterprises of Soviet Russia). In that position Martens started works on developing the Kursk Magnetic Anomaly, the largest iron ore deposits in Russia.

From 1924 to 1926, Martens worked as the first Chairman of the Committee on Invention of the Supreme Soviet of the National Economy (Комитет по делам Изобретений; the Soviet counterpart of a Western Patent Office). In 1925, he published a monograph, On the vibration of piston engines.

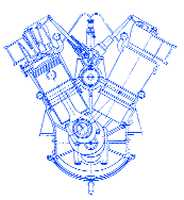
Martens engine

From 1926 to 1936, Martens worked as the Head of the Research and Development Institutes for Diesel Manufacturing (Научно-Исследовательский Институт Дизелестроения) in Leningrad. He was the author of the N-2 diesel (also known as the Martens Engine) intended as an aviation engine. The novel element of the diesel was that the 12-cylinder piston engine was aspired by a 6-cylinder piston air compressor. The diesel was tested in 1932.

From 1927 to 1941, he was the Chief Editor of the Technical Encyclopedia. In 1933, Martens wrote a letter to OGPU in support of the arrested Pavel Florensky, he also took care of Florensky's sons, Vasily and Kirill.

== Death and legacy ==
Martens retired in 1941. He died in Moscow on 19 October 1948 and was buried in Novodevichy Cemetery.

During World War II the son of Ludwig Martens, Wilhelm Ludvigovich (Willy) Martens, was active in head of the Free Germany committee intended to organize German POWs to fight alongside the Soviets against Axis troops. The committee was organized in Krasnogorsk in 1943. Wilhelm Martens also worked as a Soviet intelligence officer.

== See also ==
- Santeri Nuorteva
