= Joseph R. Brodsky =

American lawyer (died 1947)

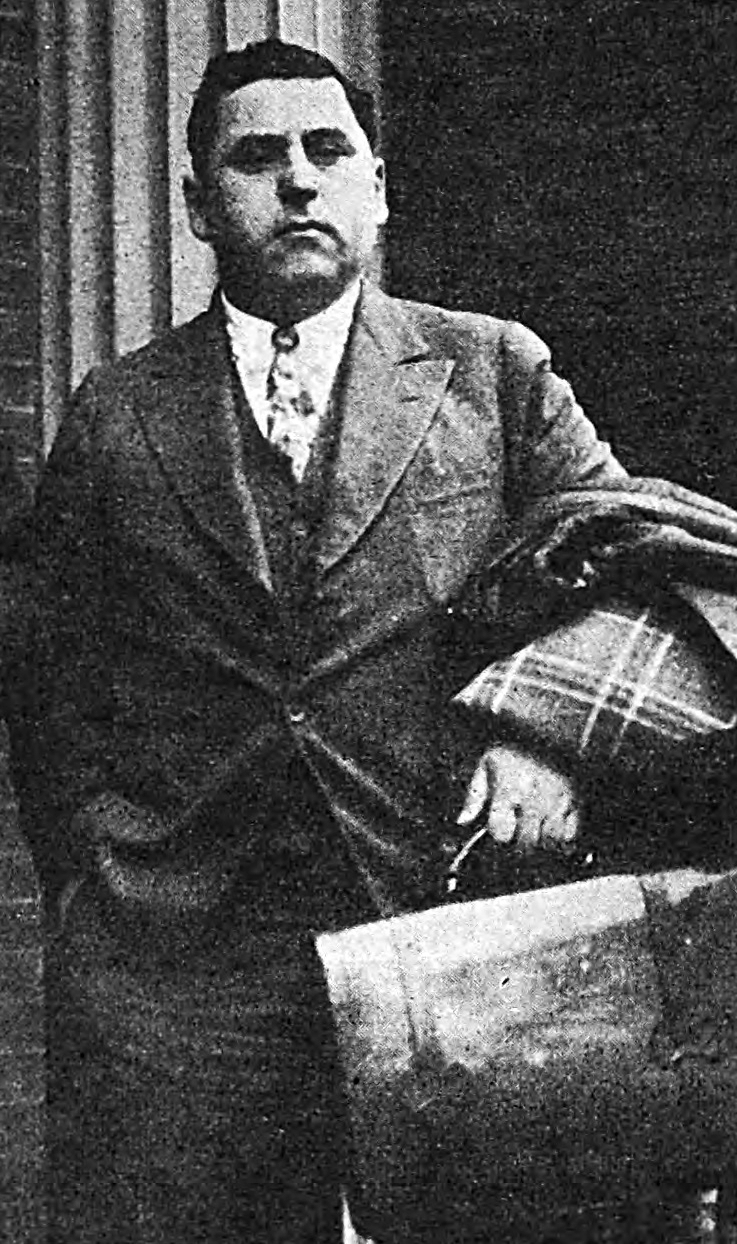
Brodsky c. 1929

Joseph R. Brodsky was an American civil rights lawyer, political activist, general counsel of the International Labor Defense (ILD), co-founder of the International Juridical Association (IJA), member of ILD defense team for members of the Scottsboro Boys Case of the 1930s, and general counsel for the International Workers Order (IWO).

== Career ==
According to Max Lowenthal, Brodsky was a partner in the law firm of a "Captain Hale." Other sources state that Brodsky was a partner with Carol Weiss King at Brodsky, King & Shorr in New York City. (Another source calls the firm "Shorr, Brodsky, and King" and states King headed it in 1925.) Others in their "loose partnership" of radical attorneys included Walter Nelles and Walter Pollak (onetime partner of Benjamin Cardozo, known through King's brother-in-law Carl Stern).

=== International Labor Defense (ILD) ===
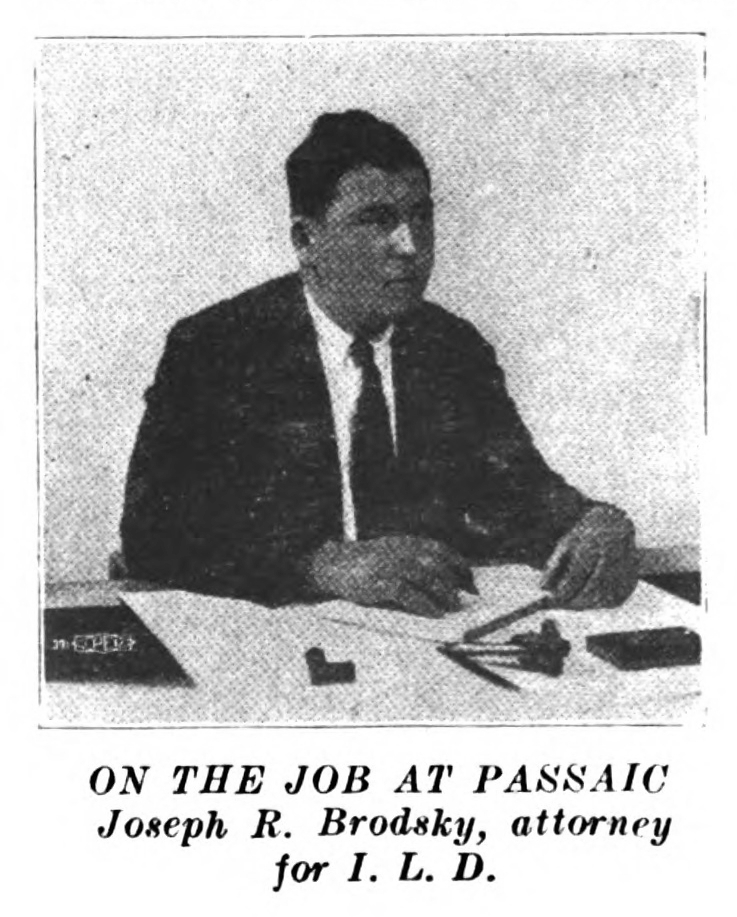
Labor Defender, July 1926

Brodsky was general counsel of the International Labor Defense (ILD), an affiliate (or "arm") of the Communist Party of the United States. The ILD was a legal advocacy organization established in 1925 as the American section of the Comintern's International Red Aid network. The ILD defended Sacco and Vanzetti, was active in the anti-lynching, movements for civil rights, and prominently participated in the defense and legal appeals in the cause célèbre of the Scottsboro Boys in the early 1930s. Its work contributed to the appeal of the Communist Party among African Americans in the South. In addition to fundraising for defense and assisting in defense strategies, from January 1926 it published Labor Defender, a monthly illustrated magazine that achieved wide circulation. In 1946 the ILD was merged with the National Federation for Constitutional Liberties to form the Civil Rights Congress, which served as the new legal defense organization of the Communist Party USA. Carol Weiss King helped Brodsky found the ILD and served on its legal advisory committee.

=== Scottsboro Boys Case ===
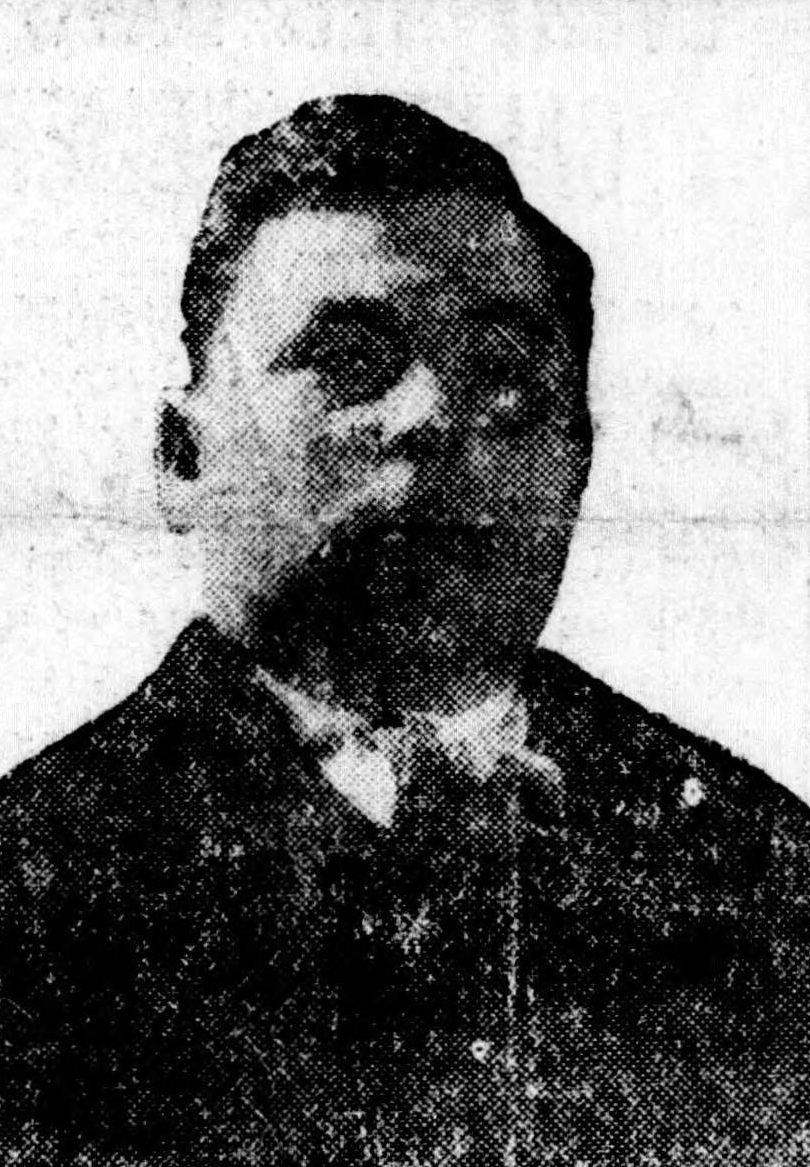
Brodsky c. 1933

In 1931, nine Southern African-American youths–the "Scottsboro Boys"–were falsely accused of rape and sentenced to death in Alabama. Between April 6 and 9, all boys except Roy Wright were tried singly or in groups and convicted. Some of the boys retained George W. Chamlee Sr., as new defense. In mid-April 1931, the International Labor Defense (ILD) and the National Association for the Advancement of Colored People (NAACP) stepped in to help. Brodsky sought first to hire Clarence Darrow, but he declined. Brodsky then worked hard to "wrest the case from the NAACP." (Carol Weiss King, Walter Pollak, and Carl Stern all worked on the Scottsboro Boys cases; Pollak argued part of it before the U.S. Supreme Court.)

On June 22, 1931, the courts denied Brodsky's motion for a new trial. When he arrived to make his application, a "howling mob of lynchers" greeted him. In August 1931, Brodsky and Chamlee had to remain in the court building until a large crowd dispersed.

At year's end, Brodsky led arguments, but on December 31, 1931, the Daily Worker newspaper published a statement for Scottsboro defendants that announced retainer of Chamlee and Brodsky as their attorneys.

Upon Brodsky's arrival:

He was met by a howling mob of lynchers. In his efforts to have the convictions set aside, Hawkins immediately overruled Brodsky's request. Brodsky took exception to the judge's ruling, whereupon the judge overruled his exception. Brodsky then countered with an exception to Hawkins' decision overruling his previous request to except. The judge became so angry that he made a grand exit through the rear door of the courtroom. In all the confusion, Brodsky turned round, and was suddenly seized by a husky man who said: "Come on, yah Jew bitch! We'll show you how to defend nigger rapers."

Former ILD chairman J. Louis Engdahl toured 26 European countries to raise support for the Scottsboro Boys. (Engdahl died in Moscow of pneumonia during the trip.) In Chemnitz, Germany, two demonstrators were killed during protests. In the United States, "the Communist Party and the Young Communist League were the great stimulating forces which brought Scottsboro before the broad masses of organized labor. In cooperation with the ILD, the question of Negroes serving on juries was raised for the first time."

On January 21, 1932, Chamlee, Brodsky, and Irving Schwab (retained by ILD) appealed to the Alabama Supreme Court on all convictions. On March 24, 1932, the court affirms conviction of seven boys but reverses that of Eugene Williams as a minor. On May 31, 1932, the U.S. Supreme Court grants permission for leave to appeal to it. On October 10, 1932, Walter H. Pollak (retained by the ILD), argues before the U.S. Supreme Court; on November 7, 1932, the court reverses the convictions due to inadequate representation and sets new trials for 1933 in Powell v. Alabama.

In 1933, the ILD brought in Samuel Leibowitz to join him and Chamlee. The fact that Leibowitz was not a communist or even radical but rather a mainstream Democrat underscored how serious Communists were to win the case. That said, Leibowitz did have to accept as co-counsel ILD chief attorney Joseph Brodsky. On March 27, 1933, Leibowitz opened his defense of Haywood Patterson, the first defendant retried, by challenging Alabama's exclusion of blacks from the jury rolls and tough cross-examination of whites. On April 9, 1933, at the jury's guilty verdict of Patterson, Liebowitz compared the verdict to "the act of spitting on the tomb of Abraham Lincoln" and vowed to defend the defendants "until hell freezes over." On April 12, 1933, Leibowitz and Brodsky joined John Haynes Holmes, Arthur Garfield Hays, and Roger Baldwin at a "Labor Defense Meeting" in Union Square, New York City. On April 16, 1933, Brodsky filed a motion for new trial for Patterson, which the judge grants on June 22. In May 1933, Brodsky joined the ACLU's Arthur Garfield Hays and NAACP's Alexander Miller to meet faculty and students at Brooklyn College to discuss the case. In November 1933, third trials start for Patterson and Clarence Norris, represented by Liebowitz, Brodsky, and Chamlee; both boys receive third convictions by mid-December. On November 19, 1933, the lawyers called on U.S. President Franklin Delano Roosevelt for intervention to protect the defendants. "Conflict between Liebowitz and the Communist-dominated International Labor Defense (ILD) attorney Joseph Brodsky" undermined the effectiveness of defense, particularly after two ILD attorneys were charged with attempting to bribe witness Victoria Price. By 1934, Brodsky had dropped out of the case, apparently replaced by fellow IJA member Osmond Fraenkel.

Individual cases involved in the Scottsboro Boys case include:

- POWELL ET AL. v. STATE, 141 So. 201(Ala. 1932): Defense of Ozie Powell, William Roberson, Andy Wright, Olen Montgomery, and Eugene Williams by Chamlee Sr., Chamlee Jr., and Brodsky, supported by Irving Schwab, Allan Taub, Elias M. Schwartzbart, Joseph Tauber, and Sidney Schreiber.
- WEEMS ET AL. v. STATE, 141 So. 215 (Ala. 1932): Defense of Charlie Weems and Clarence Norris by Chamlee Sr., Chamlee Jr., and Brodsky, supported by Irving Schwab, Allan Taub, Elias M. Schwartzbart, Joseph Tauber, and Sidney Schreiber.
- PATTERSON v. STATE, 141 So. 195 (Ala. 1932): Defense of Haywood Patterson by Chamlee Sr., Chamlee Jr., and Brodsky, supported by Irving Schwab, Allan Taub, Elias M. Schwartzbart, Joseph Tauber, and Sidney Schreiber.
- NORRIS v. STATE, 156 So. 556 (Ala. 1934): Defense of Clarence Norris by Leibowitz, Brodsky, and Chamlee, supported by Osmond. Fraenkel, George Rosier, and Carol Weiss King

=== Other cases ===
In 1932, Brodsky helped Baltimore-based lawyer Bernard Ades) defend Euel Lee AKA "Orphan Jones," accused of murdering his white employer and family, in the Orphan Jones Case on the Maryland Eastern Shore.

In 1938, Brodsky served as attorney for the American Federation of Musicians by filing as amicus curiae (along with Boudin, Cohn & Glickstein) for several AFL-affiliated unions, Harold Dublirer for Window Trimmers & Displaymen's Union Local 144, Carol Weiss King for the IJA, Edward Kuntz for the ILD, Abraham Unger for the International Brotherhood of Teamsters Local 820 AFL, etc.

== Associations ==
=== International Juridical Association (IJA) ===
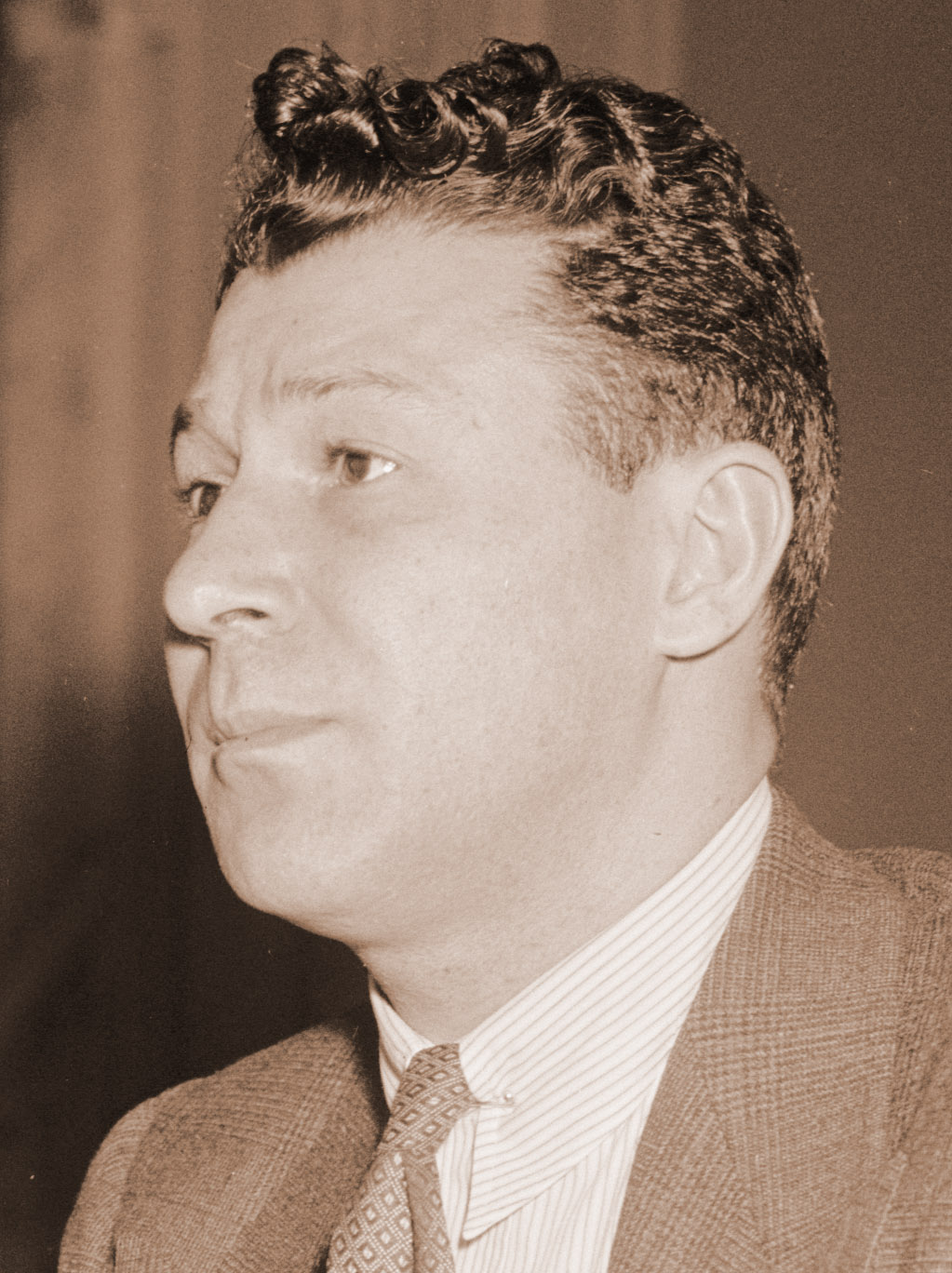
Lee Pressman was an early IJA member with Brodsky

In 1932, Brodsky became a founding member of the International Juridical Association (IJA). The IJA provided Brodsky and its members with a wide network. Other members and affiliates included: George R. Andersen, Harry Elmer Barnes, Paul F. Brissenden, Richard A. Dowling, Arthur Fisher, Osmond Fraenkel, Leo Gallagher, Aubrey Grossman, Pearl M. Hart, Robert L. Hale, Isaac S. Heller, Abraham J. Isserman, Isadore Katz, Robert W. Kenny, Paul J. Kern, Carol Weiss King, Joseph Kovner, Max Lowenthal, Jerome Michael, Louis F. McCabe, Carey McWilliams, Shad Polier, Lee Pressman, Colston E. Warne, Abrahm Lincoln Wirin, Nathan Witt, David Ziskind, Isaac E. Ferguson, Yetta Land, Maurice Sugar, David J. Bentall, John P. Davis, Charles H. Houston, Henry T. Hunt, R. W. Henderson, Austin Lewis, and Clara G. Binswanger. Beyond Brodsky, IJA members also to the ILD included: George R. Andersen, David J. Bentall, Joseph R. Brodsky, John P. Davis, Leo Gallagher, Irvin Goodman, Carol Weiss King, Edward Lamb, Yetta Land, Louis F. McCabe, Herbert T. Wechsler, Ruth Weyand, Samuel L. Rothbard, and Abraham Lincoln Wirin. The House Un-American Activities Committee considered the IJA "an official offshoot" of the ILD, itself the "legal arm" of the Communist Party.

=== Other associations ===
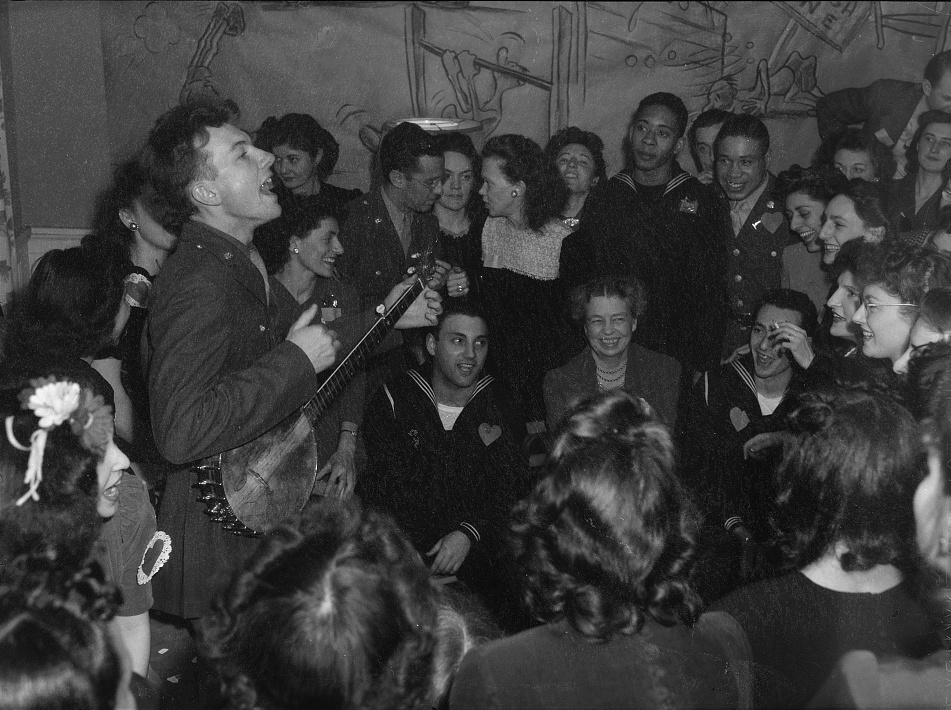
Pete Seeger (here, entertaining Eleanor Roosevelt in 1944) made Brodsky attorney for People's Songs.

Brodsky was involved in many left-leaning associations, making him a nexus of Popular Front and other political movements.

Those associations include:

- American League for Peace and Democracy: Founded in 1932 via the (Amsterdam) World Congress Against War was held in Holland in August, 1932, under the direction of the Communist International, chaired by Henri Barbusse. Prominent participants included: Francis J. McConnell, Reinhold Niebuhr, James B. Carey, Joseph Curran, Max Lerner, and Paul Robeson. Others affiliated included Brodsky and: Roger Baldwin, William Dodd Jr., Sam Jaffe, William Gropper, Louis B. Boudin, Granville Hicks, Robert Morss Lovett, T. A. Bisson, Mrs. Corliss Lamont, Ben Gold, Muriel Draper, Frances Farmer, Donald Ogden Stewart, Wanda Gag, Lewis Mumford, Vito Marcantonio, Kyle Crichton (father of Michael Crichton), Philip Loeb, Ella Winter, Earl Browder (CPUSA), Rockwell Kent, Yasuo Kuniyoshi, Alfred Kamin, Harvey O'Connor, Edgar Snow, Dr. Max Yergan, Sherwood Anderson, Melvyn Douglas, Prof, Franz Boas, Congressman John M. Coffee, Jerome Davis, John P. Davis, Theodore Dreiser, Samuel Ornitz, Morris Katz, Charles Preston, Aaron Wool, Russell Thayer, Regina Rakoczy, Sophia Pressman (wife of Lee Pressman, Israel Amter, Malcolm Cowley, Robert W. Kenny, Harry C. Lamberton, Prof. Oliver Larkin, Prof. Walter Rautenstrauch, Ella Reeve Bloor, W. E. B. DuBois, Joseph Freeman, Lillian Furness, Joseph Gardner, Kate Crane Gartz, Michael Gold, Joshua Kunitz, Corliss Lamont, Lincoln Steffens, Bruce Bliven, Clarence Hathaway, Carol Weiss King, Freda Kirchwey, and Lillian Hellman.
- Book Union" Offered as first book Proletarian Literature in the United States, sponsored by the League of American Writers and published by International Publishers. Its editorial board comprised Brodsky and: Malcolm Cowley, Robert W. Dunn, Henry Hart, Granville Hicks, Corliss Lamont, Isidor Schneider, Bernard Smith, Alexander Trachtenberg, Mary Van Kleeck, and Marian Hart. Its advisory council included Brodsky and: Roger Baldwin, Max Bedacht, Erskine Caldwell, Fielding Burke, Jack Conroy, James T. Farrell, Waldo Frank, Joseph Freeman, Hugo Gellert, Ben Gold, Michael Gold, Josephine Herbst, Langston Hughes, Matthew Josephson, Joshua Kunitz, John Howard Lawson, Robert Morss Lovett, Loren Miller, Lewis Mumford, Joseph North, Clifford Odets, Moissaye J. Olgin, Paul Peters, Edwin Seaver, John L. Spivak, Maxwell S. Stewart, John Strachey, Genevieve Taggard, Ernst Toller, Louis Weinstock, John Wexley, Ella Winter, and James Waterman Weiss.
- Celebration of 15 Years Biro-Bidjan: Founded to promote the Jewish colony in Birobidzhan, USSR, and sponsored by Brodsky and: Ben Gold, Rabbi Benjamin Plotkin, Louis Weinstock, Jacob Adler, Max Bedacht, Alexander Bittelman, Louis B. Boudin, Peter V. Cacchione, Morris Carnovsky, Dr. Bella Dodd, Abraham Flaxer, William Gropper, V. J. Jerome, Moishe Katz, Rockwell Kent, Carol Weiss King, Mrs. J. H. Macy, Mary Cabot Macy, Vito Marcantonio, Harry Mintz, Paul Muni, Clifford Odets, Max Perlow, Adam Clayton Powell Jr., Dr. Maxwell Ross, Jacob Rothbaum, Max Steinberg, James Waterman Wise, Victor A. Yakhontoff, and Benjamin Zemach.
- International Workers Order (IWO): Mutual aid society that paralleled ILD support "arm" of the Communist Party of the USA: see entry on International Workers Order.
- Jewish People's Committee (JPC): Founded in 1936 as Jewish People's Committee for United Action Against Fascism and Anti-Semitism ("Jewish People's Committee") in response to a refusal by the American Jewish Congress and the World Jewish Congress to admit representatives of the Jewish Section of the International Workers Order (IWO), ICOR, and the Fur Workers Joint Board of New York City. Founding members included: Rabbi Jacob Greenfield, William Weiner (IWO), Dr. Charles Kuntz (Icor), H. Upatschwisky (Fur Workers), and Rubin Saltzman. Mirroring Soviet foreign policy, the JPC switched from Anti-Fascism to Isolationism after the Hitler-Stalin Pact of 1939. When Nazi German attacked Soviet Russia in 1941, the JPC reverted to Anti-Fascism. Other associates included: Joseph Freeman (New Masses), A. A. Heller, Michael Gold, John Howard Lawson, Louis Weinstock, John L. Spivak, Rabbi Moses Miller, Ben Gold (Fur Workers), Rabbi J. Greenfield, Rabbi Judah L. Hahn, Ben Meyers, Harry Mintz, M. Pizer, Irving Potash, Arthur Rock, J. Sultan and Charles Zuckerman. By 1944, its national board comprised: Joseph Aronow, Dr. Edward K. Barsky, Herbert Biberman, Sabina Bluman, Dr. A. L. Bunin, J. Burakoff, Sydney Burger, Abram Flaxer, Julius Fleiss, Morris Friedman, Leonard Goldsmith, Dr. Benjamin Goodman, Dave Greene, . George Hochberg, Conrad Kaye, Aaron Kertman, Alexander Koren, Samuel Kramberg, Prof. William M. Malisoff, Saul B. Minowitz, Fern Mosk, Sam Nessin, Dr. Benjamin Netreba, Harry Poll, Irving Potash, Dora Rich, I. Rosenberg, George Sandler, S. Saniel, Henry Sazer, Morris Schwartz, Rubin Shulman, Irving Schnurman, Max Steinberg, William Weiner, Isidor Weissberg, Sol Wollin, and Tobias Wendy. JPC sponsors included: Aline Bernstein (lover of Thomas Wolfe), Louis P. Birk, Marc Blitzstein, Morris Carnovsky, Jerome Chodorov, Prof. Leon W. Cohen, Lester Cohen, Lion Feuchtwanger, Irving Fineman, Dr. Abraham Goldfeld, William Gropper (artist), Prof. N. Levinson, Josef Lhevinne, Rosina Lhevinne, Irving M. Lechtenstein, Albert Maltz, Samuel Ornitz, Prof. Bernard F. Riess, Raphael Soyer (artist), Alfred K. Stern (husband of Martha Dodd), Maurice Sugar (union lawyer), Max Weber, Z. Weinper, Prof. Louis Weisner, and John Wexley. The House Un-American Activities Committee considered it a Communist front.
- National Federation for Constitutional Liberties: Founded in June 1940 "one of the most important Communist-front organizations in the United States"; advocated termination of the House Un-American Activities Committee. Members included Brodsky and: Prof. Franz Boas, Elmer Benson, Herbert Biberman, Carey McWilliams, Max Yergan, Howard P. Costigan, George Marshall, Robert MacGregor, Tom Mooney, Jack McMichael, Prof. Robert K. Speer, Merle D. Vincent, Alice Barrows, Marc Blitzstein, Rev. Dwight Bradley, Prof. John B. Canning, John M. Coffee, Bella Dodd, Robert W. Dunn, Mrs. Sarah Bard Field, Dashiell Hammett, Pearl M. Hart, Marion Hathway, Abraham J. Isserman, Paul J. Kern, Carol Weiss King, Edward Land, David Lasser, Ira Latimer, Prof. Alain Locke, Robert Morss Lovett, Prof. Robert S. Lynd, Clifford T. McAvoy, Louis F. McCabe, James B. McNamara, Prof. William M. Malisoff, Albert Maltz, Vito Marcantonio, Prof. F. O. Matthiessen, Lewis Merrill, Jerry O'Connell, William L. Patterson, Michael Quill, Walter Rauteustrauch, Reid Robinson, George Seldes, Herman Shumlin, Edwin S. Smith, Alfred K. Stern, Donald Ogden Stewart, Channing H. Tobias, Prof. Colston E. Warne, Morris Watson, Ella Winter, Robert Wirtz, Charles Erskine Scott Wood, John Woodruff, Richard Wright, and Art Young.
- National Lawyers Guild: Founded 1940 as successor to the IJA–see entry National Lawyers Guild.
- People's Songs, Inc. Established January 31, 1946, with chief director Pete Seeger and other directors Herbert Haufrect, Lee Hays, Daniel Lapidus, and Robert Claiborne, plus Joe Brodsky as corporation's attorney. Board members included: B. A. Bodkin, Tom Glazer, Horace Grenell, Woody Guthrie, John Hammond Jr., Herbert Haufrect, Bess Hawes, Waldemar Hille, Paul Kent, Millard Lampell, Earl Robinson, Bob Russell, Walter Lowenfels, Kenneth Spencer, Alec Wilder, and Palmer Weber.
- New York Workers School Brodsky was associated with this organization–see entry New York Workers School.

== Personal life and death ==
Brodsky died age 58 on July 30, 1947, as reported by the Daily Worker, which listed him as a charter member of the Communist Party.

Two thousand people attended his funeral and more than twenty served as pall bearers. Attendees included IWO head Rockwell Kent, US Rep. Vito Marcantonio, CPUSA head William Z. Foster, New York City Councilman Stanley M. Isaacs, singer-actor Paul Robeson, ACPFB head Abner Green, ILGWU's Irving Potash, NLG chapter head Abraham Unger, and ANC head Max Yergan.

== Legacy ==
In the 1920s, Brodsky mentored Vito Marcantonio and "significantly contributed to his left orientation" toward Marxism. Marcantonio went on to serve in the U.S. House of Representatives from New York's 18th district from January 3, 1945, until January 3, 1951.

The still-existent National Lawyers Guild is an outgrowth of his efforts at the ILD and IJA.

== See also ==
- Vito Marcantonio
- Isaac Shorr
- Carol Weiss King
- International Labor Defense
- International Juridical Association
- Scottsboro Boys
- Haywood Patterson
- Samuel Liebowitz
- Powell v. Alabama

== External sources ==
- Famous Trials: references to Brodsky
- Getty Images: Joseph Brodsky during Scottsboro Boys Case
