= Vito Marcantonio =

American lawyer and politician (1902–1954)

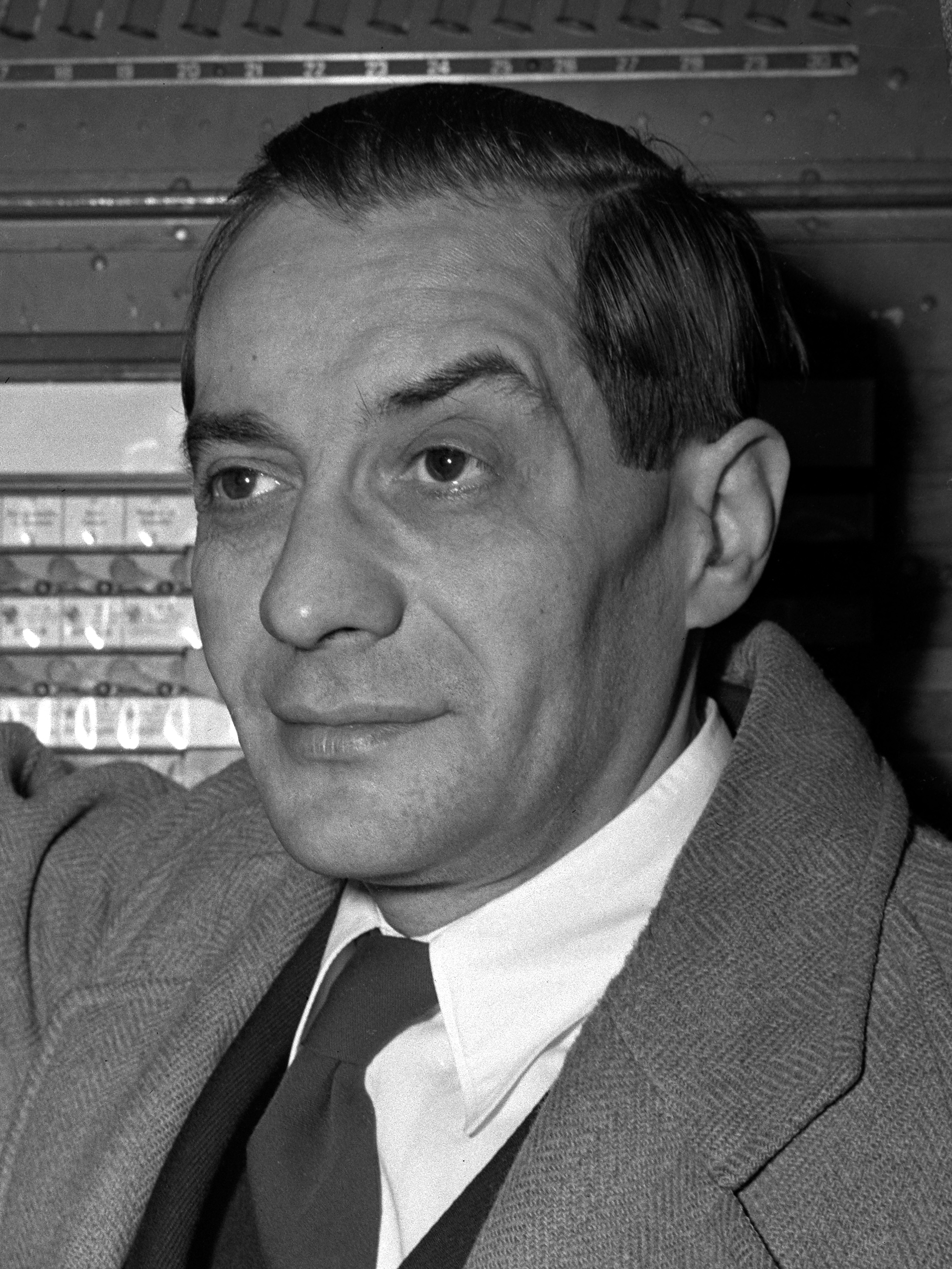
- Marcantonio in 1946

Member of the U.S. House of Representatives from New York
- In office January 3, 1939 – January 3, 1951
- Preceded by: James J. Lanzetta
- Succeeded by: James G. Donovan
- Constituency: 20th district (1939–1945); 18th district (1945–1951)
- In office January 3, 1935 – January 3, 1937
- Preceded by: James J. Lanzetta
- Succeeded by: James J. Lanzetta
- Constituency: 20th district

New York State Chairman of the American Labor Party
- In office January 8, 1948 – November 6, 1953
- Preceded by: Hyman Blumberg
- Succeeded by: Peter K. Hawley

Personal details
- Born: Vito Anthony Marcantonio; December 10, 1902 New York City, U.S.
- Died: August 9, 1954 (aged 51) New York City, U.S.
- Party: Republican (before 1937); American Labor (after 1937)
- Other political affiliations: Farmer–Labor (1920); Progressive (1924); Progressive (1948–1954)
- Spouse: Miriam A. Sanders (m. 1925)
- Education: New York University School of Law (LL.B.)

Vito Anthony Marcantonio (December 10, 1902 – August 9, 1954) was an American lawyer and politician who represented East Harlem in New York City for seven terms in the United States House of Representatives.

For most of his political career, he was a member of the American Labor Party, believing that neither major American political party supported the interests of the working class. For two years prior to his party switching to Labor, he had been a New Deal coalition member of the progressive branch of the Republican Party, like his mentor and ally Fiorello La Guardia. Marcantonio was ideologically a socialist, and a supporter of political causes and positions which he deemed in the interests of the working class, poor, immigrants, labor unions, and civil rights.

Marcantonio's constituency in Congress included the smaller neighborhoods of Italian Harlem and Spanish Harlem and was home to many ethnic Italians, Jews, African Americans, and Puerto Ricans. He spoke Spanish, Italian, and English. Marcantonio advocated fiercely for the rights of African Americans, Italian American immigrants, and Puerto Rican immigrants in Harlem, as well as for unions and workers in general.

== Early life and education ==
Marcantonio was the son of an American-born father and Italian-born mother, both with origins in Picerno, in the Basilicata region of Southern Italy. He was born on December 10, 1902, in the impoverished Italian Harlem ghetto of East Harlem, New York City. He attended New York City public schools, becoming the only member of his class from East Harlem to graduate from De Witt Clinton High School in Hell's Kitchen, and eventually received his LL.B. from the New York University School of Law in 1925.

== Early career ==
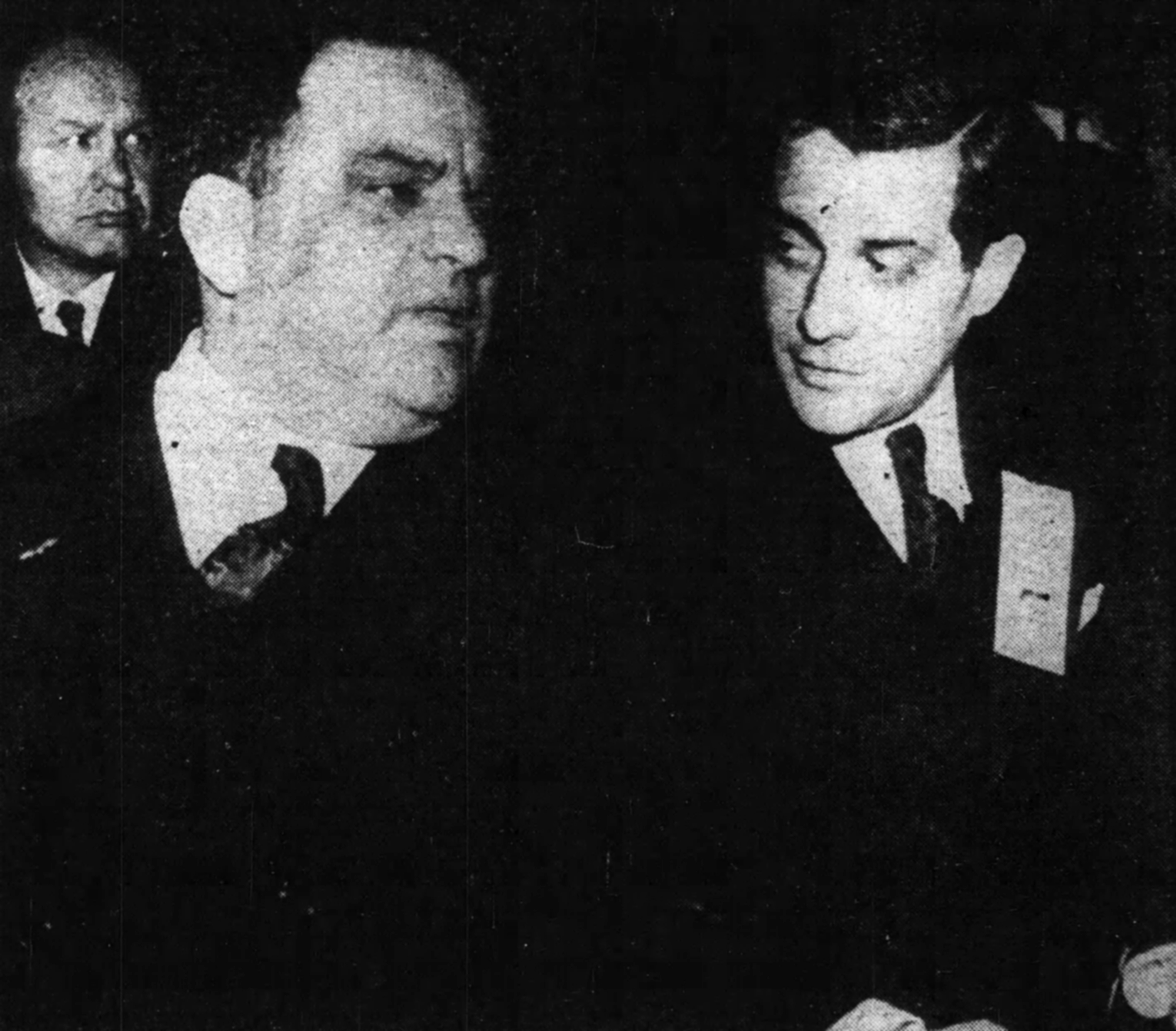
Congressman Fiorello La Guardia (left) and Marcantonio, his campaign manager, c. late 1920s

In the 1920 United States presidential election, Marcantonio campaigned for Parley P. Christensen, the candidate of the Farmer-Labor Party. In 1924, he became campaign manager for the congressional campaign of Fiorello La Guardia, then a Progressive-Socialist. Together, LaGuardia and Marcantonio also campaigned for U.S. Senator Robert M. La Follette for president in that year's presidential election. Marcantonio also became secretary of the Tenants League, which fought high rents and evictions.

After passing the New York bar examination in 1925, Marcantonio began practicing law, first for Foster, La Guardia, and Cutler. He clerked at the law firm of Swinburne Hale, Walter Nelles, and Isaac Shorr, known for its representation of politically radical individuals and organizations. There, he worked with labor lawyer Joseph R. Brodsky, who "significantly contributed to his left orientation" toward Marxism. Marcantonio managed La Guardia's successful congressional re-election campaigns in 1926 to 1932. He worked as an assistant United States attorney from 1930 to 1931. He was an important figure in the La Guardia's successful campaign for mayor of New York City in 1933, and was regarded to be La Guardia's political heir apparent.

== U.S. House of Representatives ==
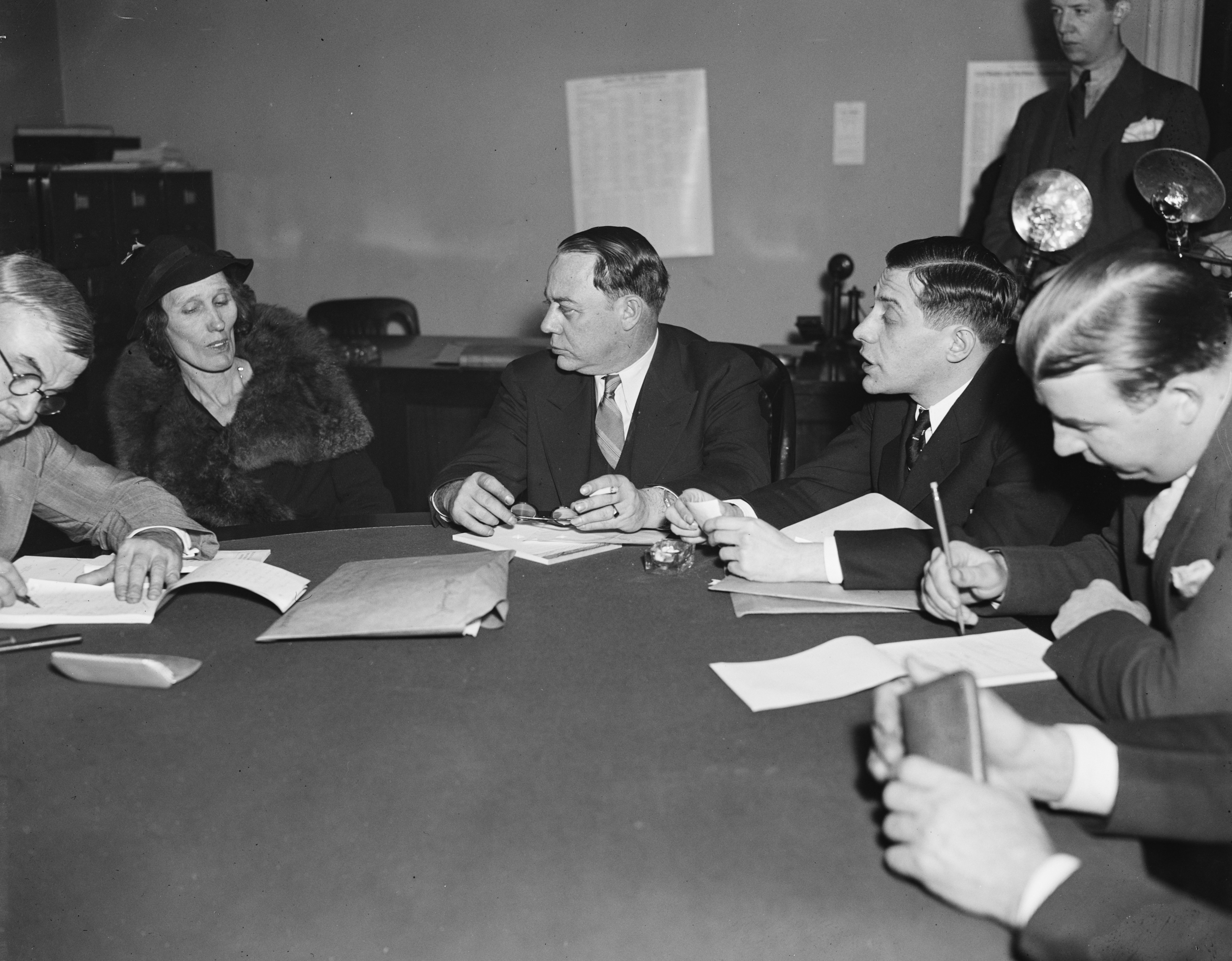
Mrs. Charles Jones of Gauley Bridge, West Virginia (left), testifies on silicosis deaths before the House Labor Committee, January 20, 1936. Marcantonio (right) instigated the investigation.

Marcantonio was first elected to the United States House of Representatives from New York in 1934 as a Republican. He received a warm write-up in the New Masses in the November 1936 issue. He served in the House from 1935 until 1937 but was defeated in 1936 for re-election. Marcantonio's district was centered in his native East Harlem, New York City, which had many residents and immigrants of Italian and Puerto Rican origin. Fluent in Spanish as well as Italian, he was considered an ally of the Puerto Rican and Italian-American communities, and an advocate for the rights of the workers, immigrants, and the poor.

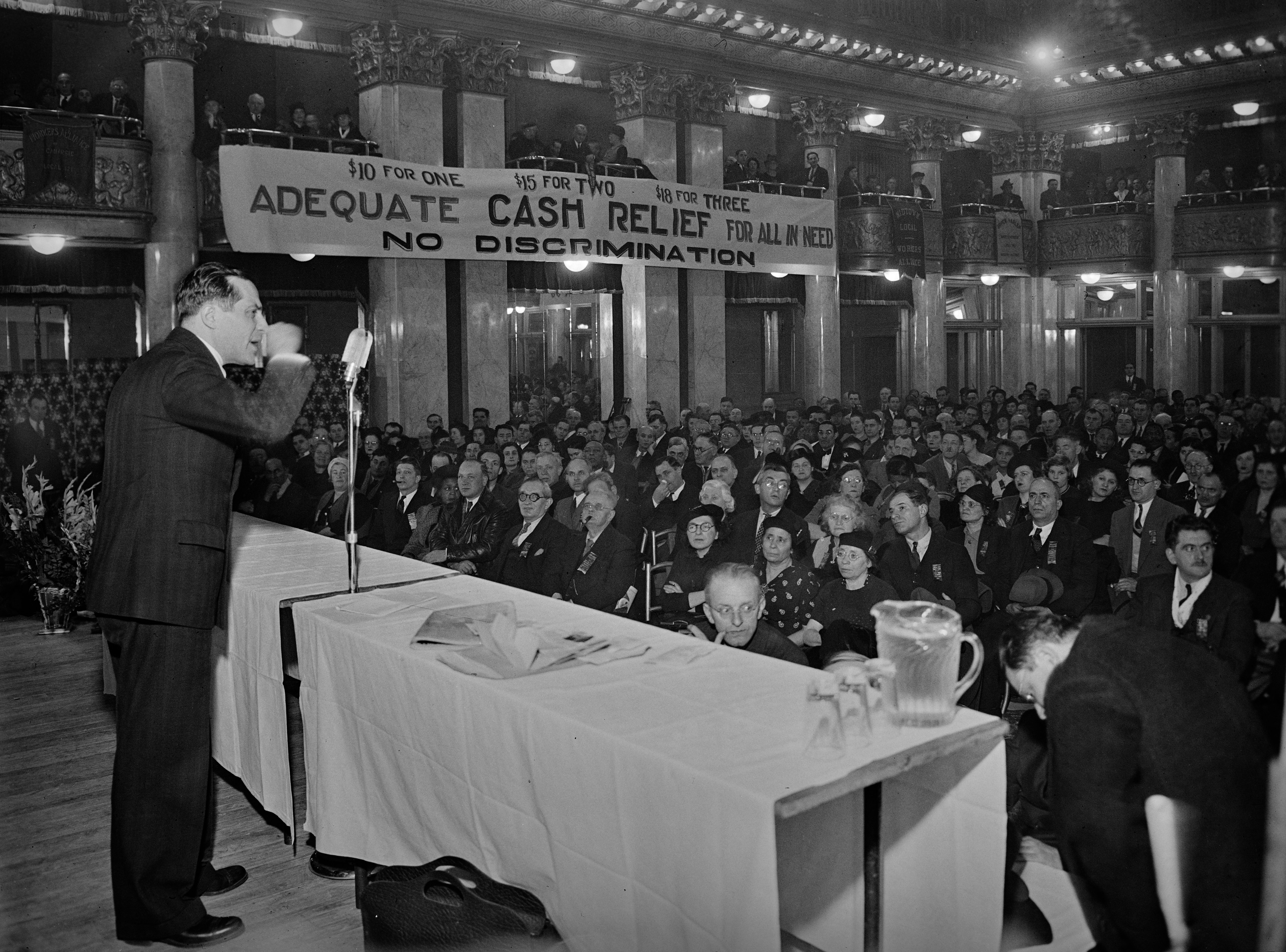
Marcantonio denounces WPA budget cuts at a Workers Alliance convention, January 13, 1940

Marcantonio was arguably one of the most left-wing members of Congress, He was investigated by the FBI in the 1940s and 1950s because of his extensive affiliation with members of the Communist Party USA and known Communist front groups. He strongly supported the New Deal of President Franklin D. Roosevelt, a Democrat.

In 1936, Marcantonio lost re-election. However, he won his seat back in the 1938 election while running under the American Labor Party nomination. He was subsequently re-elected to six further terms, with his second stint in the House lasting from 1939 to 1951 (being reelected in the elections of 1940, 1942, 1944, 1946, and 1948). He was so popular in that district that he cross-filed in the cross-filing primaries between Democratic and Republican primaries, and won the nominations of both parties. He also gained the endorsement of the ALP, in an example of electoral fusion. Aside from Marcantonio, the only other ALP congressman was Leo Isacson, who served in Congress from 1948 to 1949, after winning a special election, but was defeated in the next general election.

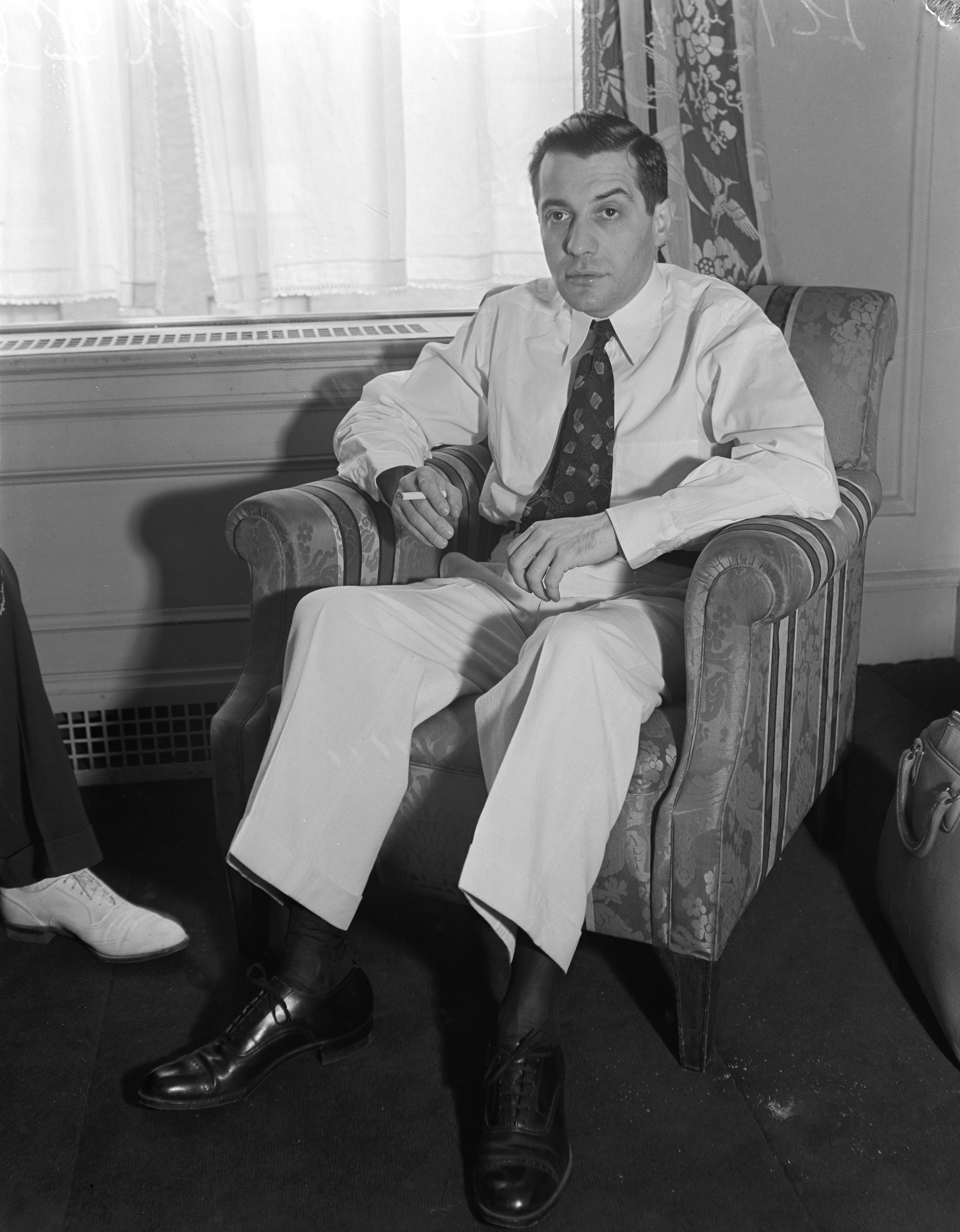
Marcantonio on a visit to Los Angeles c. 1930s

Marcantonio stood as an ally to causes important to Puerto Rican and Italian communities and common workers, and was also a strong advocate of Harlem's African-American communities and fought vehemently for black civil rights decades before the civil rights movement of the 1950s–1960s. He perennially supported civil rights legislation.

Marcantonio strongly opposed Congressman Martin Dies Jr. and his House Un-American Activities Committee, which was created in 1937 to investigate activities considered un-American and subversive as part of the Red Scare.

Marcantonio was elected chairman of the New York County American Labor Party in 1939, serving in that position for several years as a leader of the party's left wing alongside City Councilman Eugene P. Connolly, secretary of the party in the county.

Marcantonio (center) greets labor leaders planning an "Italian-American Unity Rally" at Madison Square Garden, September 2, 1943

In the early years of World War II, Marcantonio viewed the war as being fueled by competing imperialist desires by the Allies of World War II and Axis powers, and opposed a United States entry into the conflict. In 1940, he helped form the American Peace Mobilization (APM), a group whose aim was to keep the U.S. from participating in the war. Before the signing of the Molotov–Ribbentrop Pact in Moscow August 23, 1939, the APM's precursor organization, the Comintern-directed American League for Peace and Democracy, had been anti-Nazi. Marcantonio served as the APM's vice-chair. He appeared in a newsreel in 1940 denouncing "the imperialist war", a line taken by Joseph Stalin and his supporters in the Soviet Union (USSR) until Operation Barbarossa. The Pact lasted until the Germans broke it by invading the Soviet Union on June 22, 1941. In 1942, Marcantonio worked to expand the U.S. military commitment to a second front in Europe against the Nazi German expansion, which became Operation Torch. The USSR ordered Communist parties throughout the world to promote the idea to help it defeat Nazism. Marcantonio was also a vice president of the International Workers Order, a fraternal benefit society unofficially affiliated with the Communist Party.

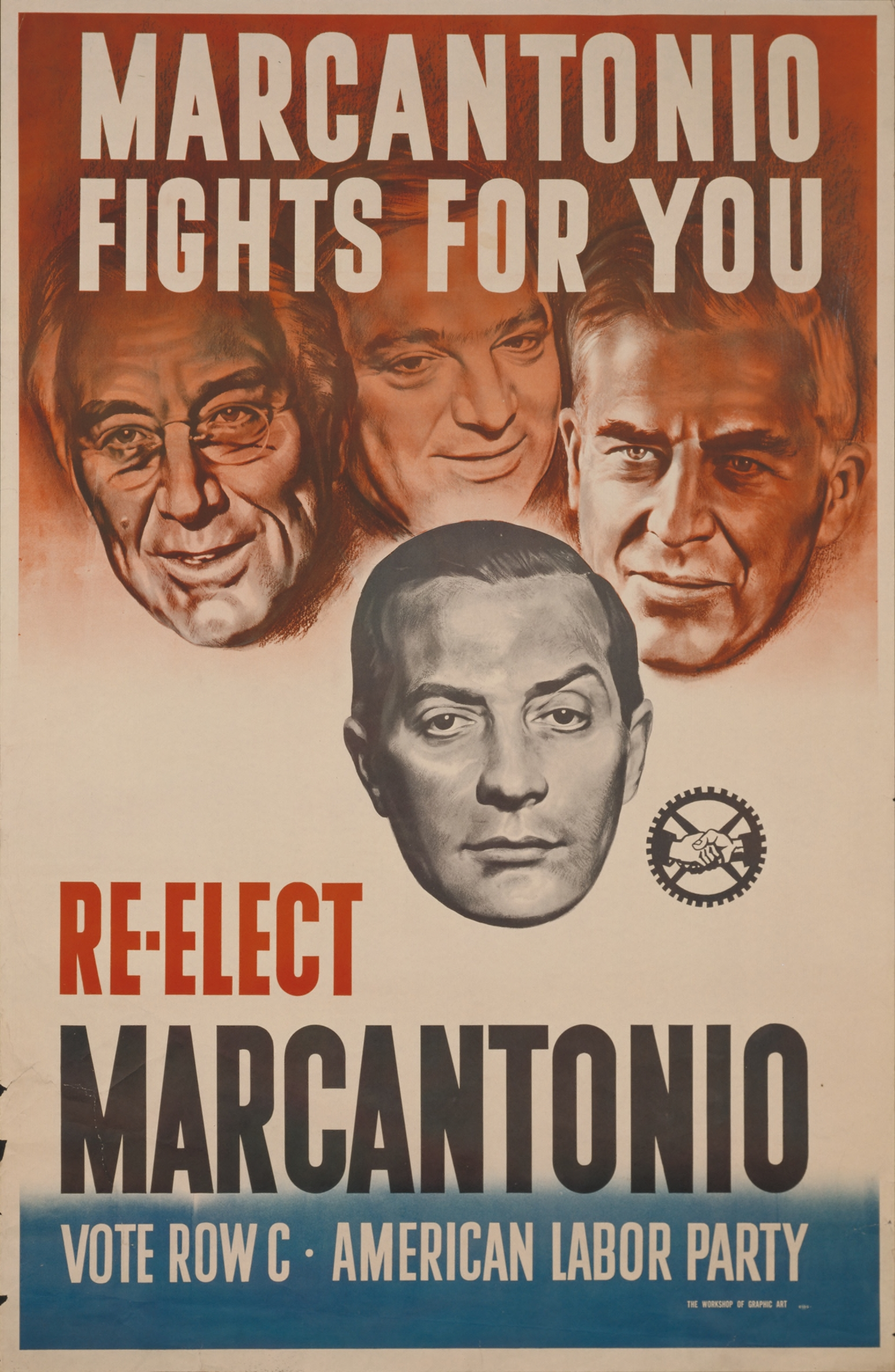
American Labor Party campaign poster featuring Marcantonio as a candidate for reelection to Congress, 1948. Above him the faces of Franklin D. Roosevelt, Fiorello La Guardia, and Henry A. Wallace look on.

There was a strong effort to unseat Marcantonio from Congress in 1946, including a smear campaign by media outlets. However, Marcantonio won re-election by a margin of 5,500. On election day, a Republican election captain named Joseph Scottoriggio, who was supporting Marcantonio's opponent, was severely beaten and died days later. New York City mobster Mike Coppola is believed to have been responsible.

In 1947, when the U.S. Congress passed legislation to provide financial aid to fight communism in Turkey and Greece, such as during the Greek Civil War, Marcantonio was the only congressman to not applaud the action, symbolizing his disagreement with the Truman Doctrine. In 1950, Marcantonio opposed American involvement in the Korean War. He argued that North Korea had been the victim of an unprovoked attack by South Korea. He cited articles by I. F. Stone, a radical journalist.

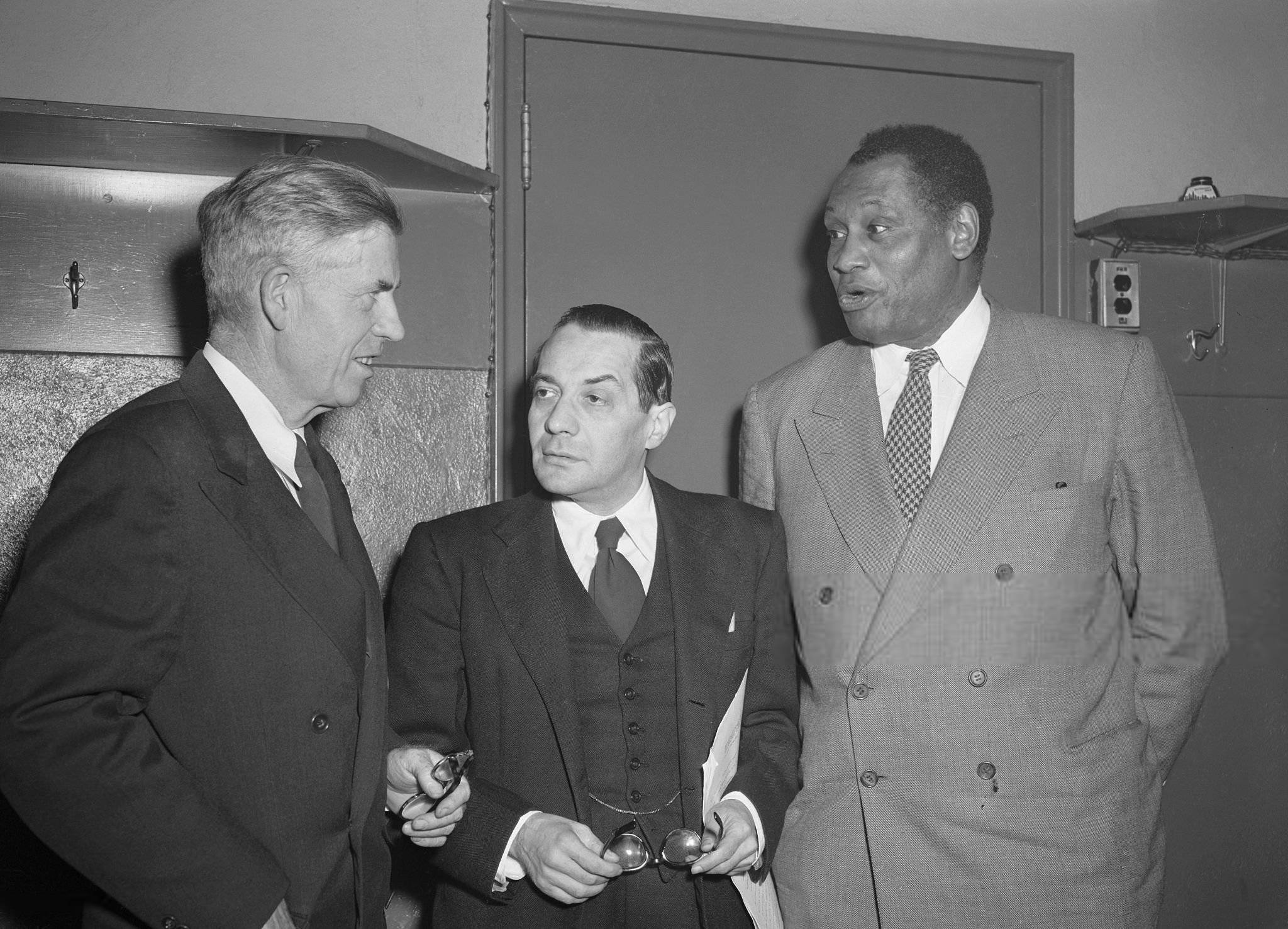
Henry Wallace and Paul Robeson flank Marcantonio just before an American Labor Party rally at Madison Square Garden, 1949

Marcantonio opposed the 1947 creation of the Central Intelligence Agency in 1947, arguing that the agency would "under the guise of research and study" conduct espionage trade unions and businesses in order to assert the will of the military upon them.

On November 25, 1947, the day after the House voted for indictment of the Hollywood Ten for contempt of Congress, Representative Walter Judd attacked Marcantonio by likening the ALP to the China Democratic League in China at that time. He said: "The history of the Democratic League is astonishingly like that of the American Labor Party to which the gentleman belongs. It was originally a coalition of labor groups, liberals and Communists. Then the genuine liberals discovered that it and they were being used as fronts or tools of the Communists, and, as the gentleman from New York is well aware, they broke off and established the Liberal Party."

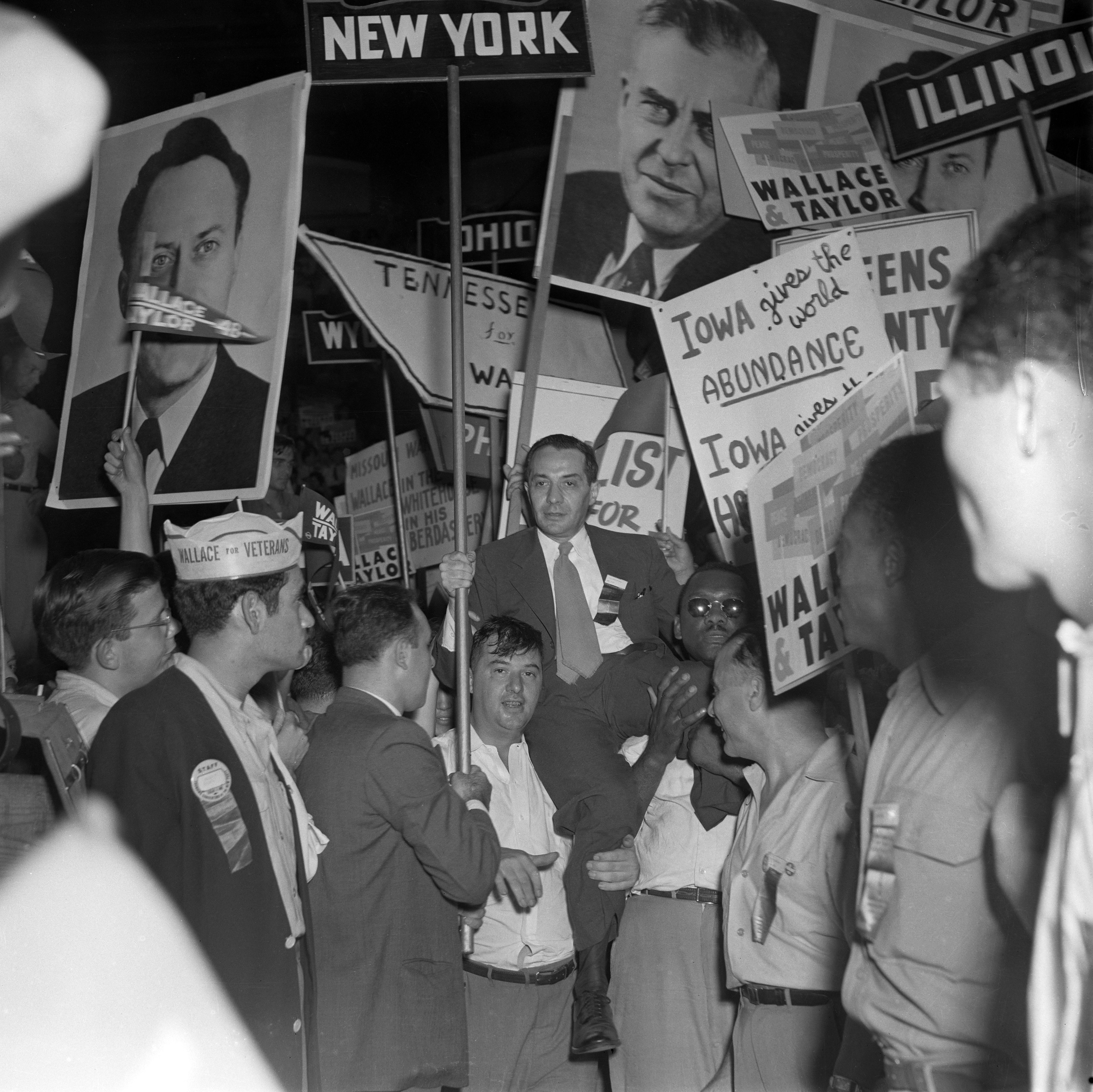
Marcantonio is carried on the shoulders of delegates to the 1948 Progressive National Convention, July 1948

In 1948, Marcantonio was an avid supporter of former Vice President Henry A. Wallace, who ran for President on the Progressive Party ticket. A campaign film by Carl Marzani shows Marcantonio's district and his efforts on its behalf. Marcantonio became state chairman of the ALP in January, and was re-elected in November. His re-election that year came despite an intense opposition (motivated by opposition to his anti-McCarthyism).

In 1949, Marcantonio ran for Mayor of New York City on the ALP ticket but was defeated.

In his last term in Congress, Marcantonio opposed U.S. involvement in the Korean War.

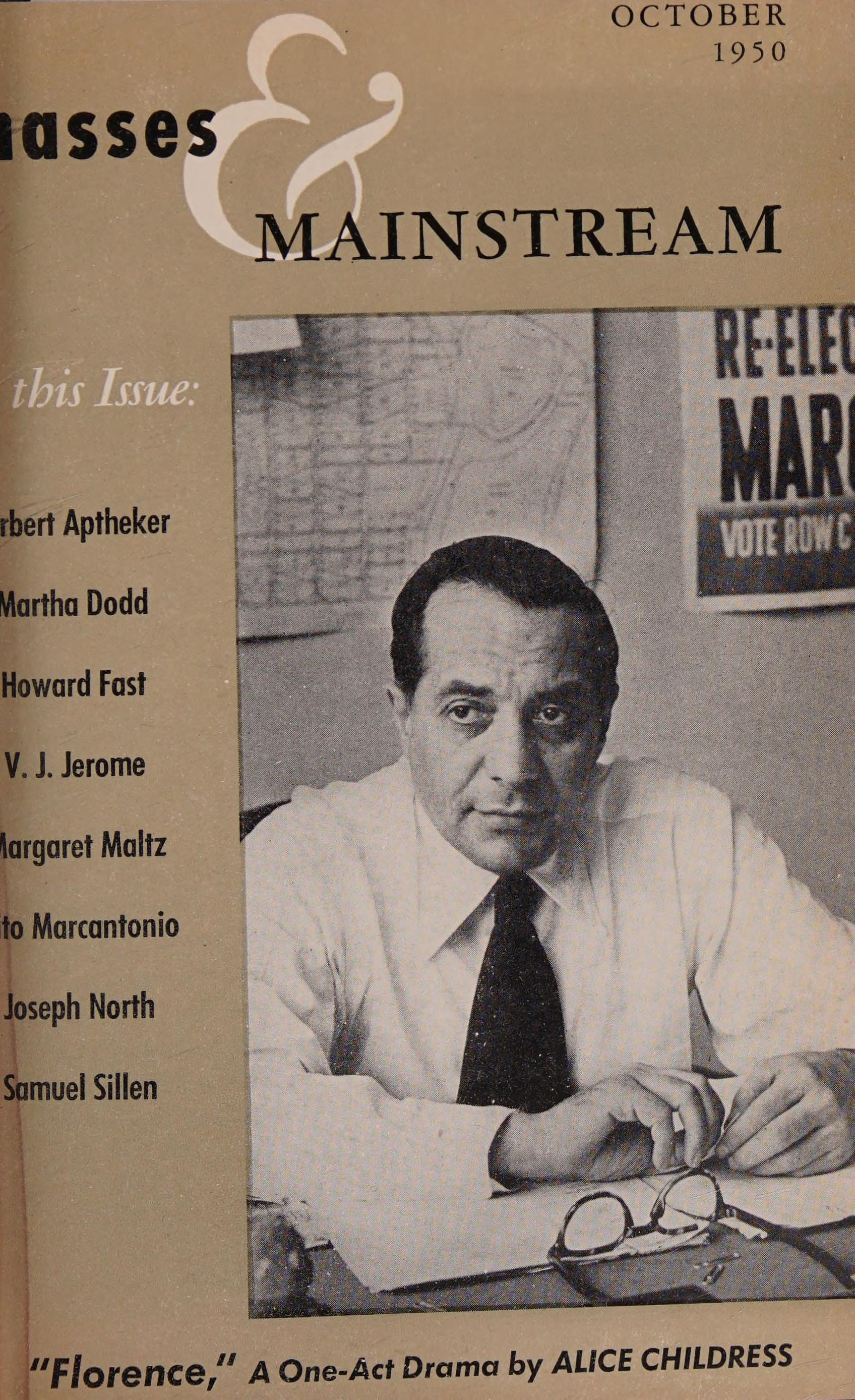
Marcantonio on the cover of Masses & Mainstream, October 1950

In 1950, the Democratic, Republican, and Liberal parties (through electoral fusion) backed a single candidate against Marcantonio, who was in turn endorsed by all of the city's major newspapers. Since Marcantonio had been able to win reelection in 1948 due to the Democrats and Republicans splitting the vote, Republican leader Thomas J. Curran and Democratic leader Ferdinand Pecora worked together to find a compromise candidate. Jonathan Brewster Bingham, John Ellis, James J. Lanzetta, Thomas Francis Murphy, and Wendell Willkie's wife Edith Willkie were considered, but James G. Donovan was ultimately selected.

During the campaign, Marcantonio attacked Donovan as a "Sutton Place Dixiecrat". He was defeated by Donovan in the 1950 election, receiving only 40% of the vote. The Liberals opposed Donovan in later elections. The passage of the Wilson Pakula Act in 1947 also played some part in Marcantonio's defeat. The law prevented candidates from running in the primaries of parties with which they were not affiliated. It was widely perceived as being directed against Marcantonio. As the sole representative of his party for most of his years in Congress, Marcantonio never held a committee chairmanship. After his defeat in 1950 and the withdrawal of the Communist Party support for the ALP, the party soon fell apart.

== Later life and death ==
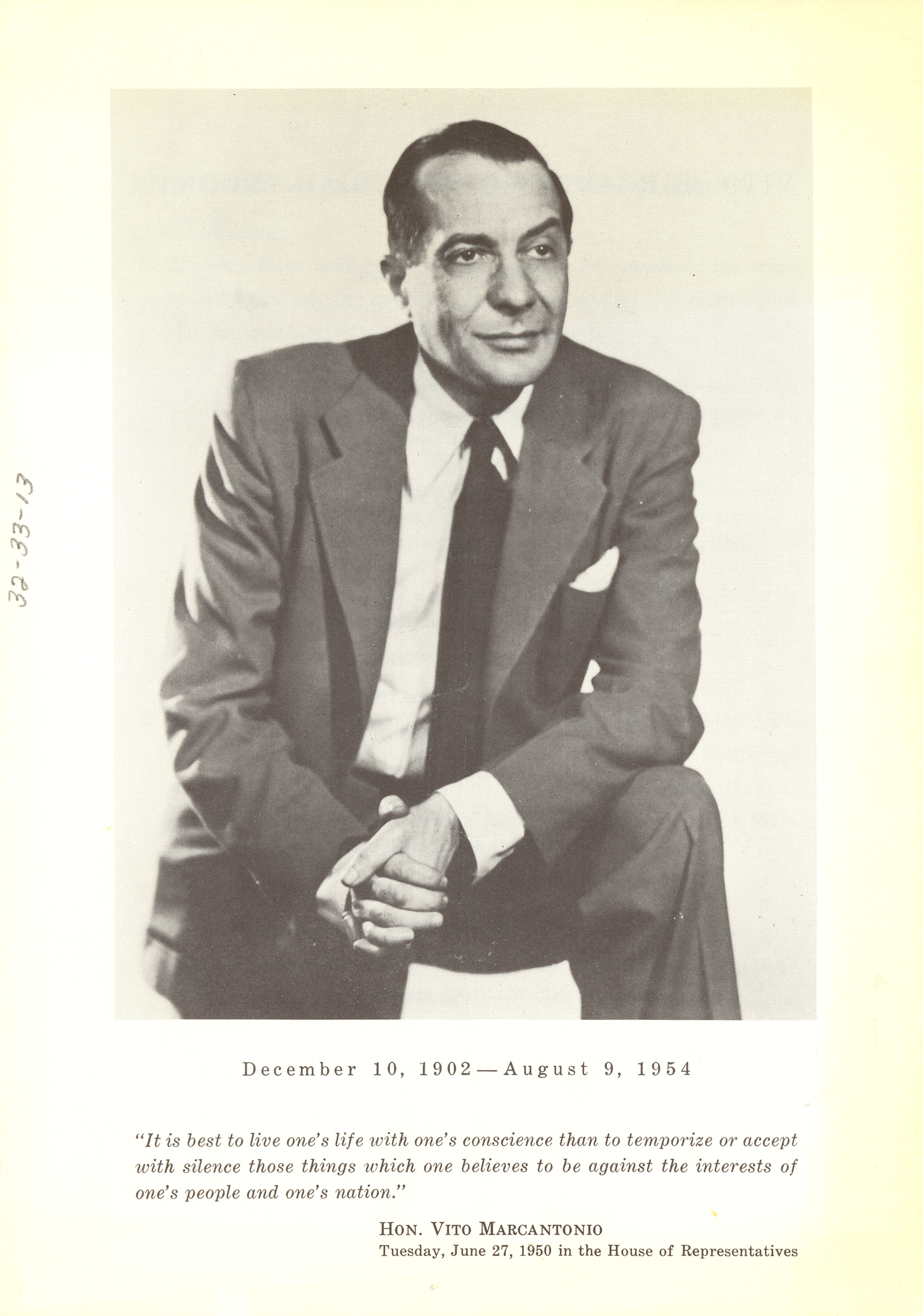
Memorial program, December 7, 1954

After his defeat in mayoral and congressional elections, Marcantonio continued to practice law. It was his law practice, maintained while in Congress, that had generated the money by which he substantially self-financed his political campaigns. At first, he practiced in Washington, D.C., but he soon returned to New York City.

In the 1952 presidential election, Marcantonio supported the Progressive Party ticket of Vincent Hallinan for president and Charlotta Bass for vice president. Bass (an African-American woman) was the first woman of color to be nominated for vice president. Marcantonio attended the party's 1952 nominating convention in Chicago. Soon afterward, in personal correspondence, he hailed W.E.B. Du Bois's keynote address to the convention, writing that he fully concurred with assertions made in the speech about black political representation. In supporting the party's 1952 nominees, he characterized a vote for the third-party ticket as highly valuable, remarking,

A vote for the Progressive Party in 1952... is a vote as valuable as that cast for the Liberty Party in 1840 against slavery, and for the Free Soil Party in 1848 and 1852 against extension of slavery. It is a vote similar to the one that made up the one million votes for Eugene V. Debs in 1920, which in turn led to the four million votes for LaFollette in 1924 and for victory for [Franklin] Roosevelt in 1932. Great causes were never won by sacrificing a real fight and substituting for it the seeming lesser evil.

In his address to the party's 1952 presidential nominating convention, Marcantonio remarked,

With belief in our fathers, and faith in our people, we here at this Convention constitute the people's opposition to the juggernaut of war, oppression and reaction, and we today, the political lineal descendants of the Free Soilers of over 100 years ago, raise our banner on which are inscribed the words: "free speech and free and equal men living in a world of peace." I say we are not wasting time; we are not fighting in vain. For as we battle in 1952, to that extent will we earn the right to be the hard core of the great political party that will follow in the realignment which will inexorably ensue from the disintegration of the Democratic Party.

Marcantonio resigned as state chairman of the ALP soon after the 1953 mayoral election, citing an "inherent division" that prevented it from acting as an independent political force. He left the party altogether, and launched a campaign for his former congressional seat, initially as an independent, pledging as a candidate,

I shall continue to strive as an independent for the things for which I have striven so hard. I shall continue to do so as an independent endeavoring for the political realignment which is inevitable. It is as inevitable as the failure of the Republican and Democrat foreign policy and the economy that is based upon it.

He ultimately became the candidate of a newly formed third party, the Good Neighbor Party. However, he died before the general election was held, suffering a fatal heart attack on August 9, 1954 while traveling up subway stairs on Broadway by City Hall Park in Lower Manhattan. As a devout Catholic, he was given conditional absolution and extreme unction, the last sacrament of the Catholic Church. He was nevertheless refused a Catholic funeral, with the Archdiocese of New York claiming he was not practicing and had not been reconciled to the Church at the time of his death. His service at a funeral home was attended by more than 20,000 people.

== Political ideology ==
Marcantonio was inspired politically by his Catholic faith.

=== Views on communism and criticism of the Red Scare ===
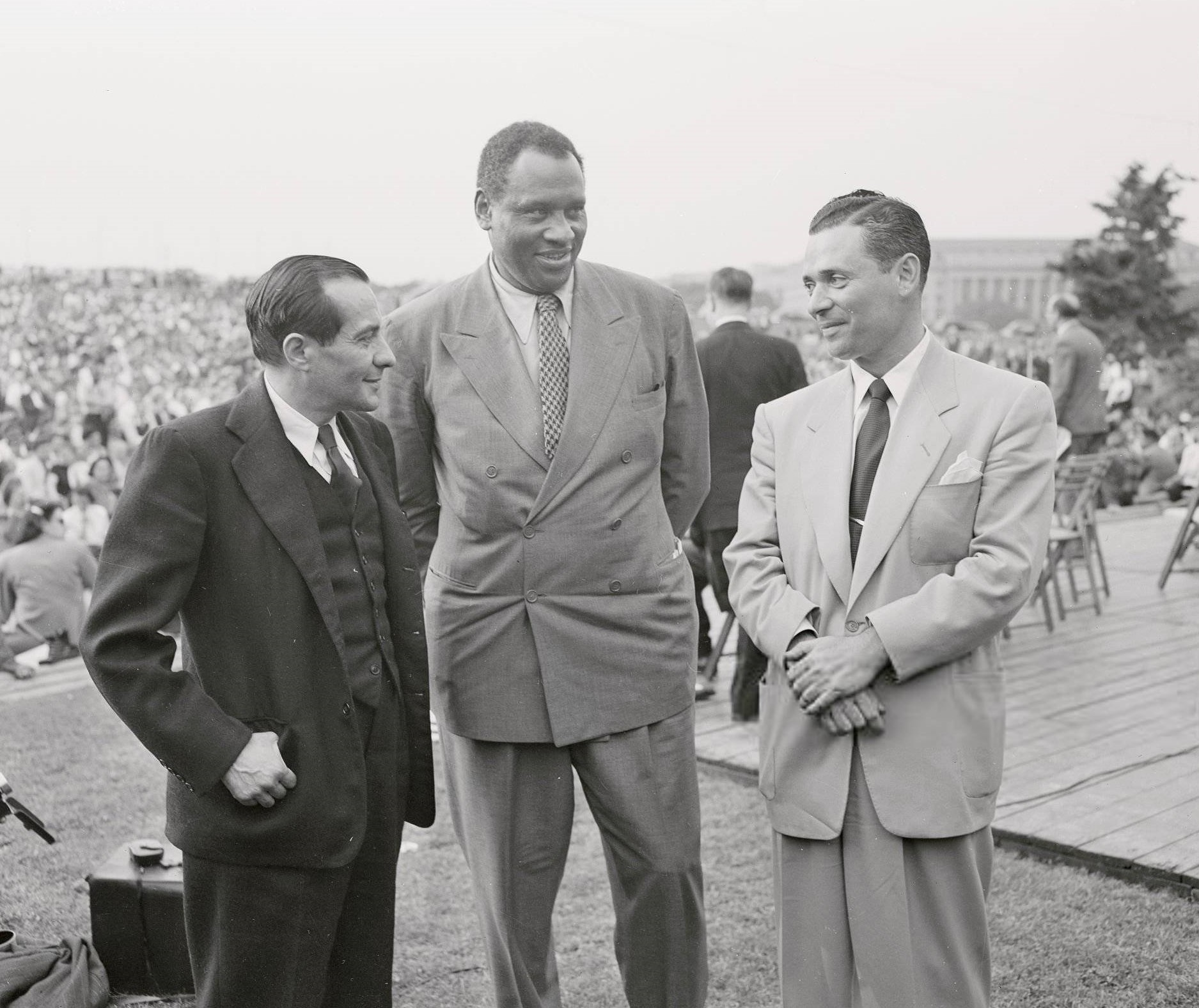
Marcantonio (left) with Paul Robeson and Leo Isacson at an event in Washington, D.C. protesting the Mundt Bill, June 1, 1948

Marcantonio, who was arguably one of the most left-wing members of Congress, said that party loyalty was less important than voting with his conscience. He was sympathetic to the Socialist and Communist parties, and to labor unions. He was investigated by the FBI in the 1940s and 1950s because of his extensive affiliation with members of the Communist Party and known Communist front groups.

When accused in his early congressional tenure of secretly supporting the United States Communist Party he remarked,

I disagree with the Communists. I emphatically do not agree with them, but they have a perfect right to speak out and to advocate communism. I maintain that the moment we deprive those with whom we extremely disagree of their right to freedom of speech, the next thing that will happen is that our own right of freedom of speech will be taken away from us.

An opponent of the House Un-American Activities Committee, in 1940 Marcantonio accused its participants of using anti-communism to distract public attention away from an anti-worker agenda, remarking,

If communism is destroyed, I do not know what some of you will do. It has become the most convenient method by which you wrap yourselves in the American flag in order to cover up some of the greasy stains on the legislative toga. You can vote against the unemployed, you can vote against the W.P.A. workers, and you can emasculate the Bill of Rights of the Constitution of the United States; you can try to destroy the National Labor Relations Law, the Magna Carta of American labor; you can vote against the farmer; and you can do all that with a great deal of impunity, because after you have done so you do not have to explain your vote.

=== Civil rights ===
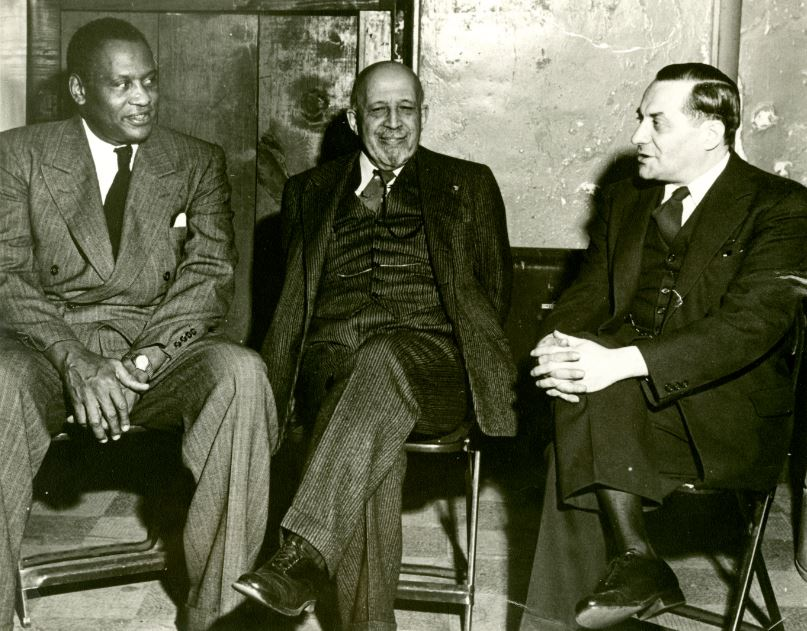
Marcantonio (right) with W. E. B. Du Bois (center) and Paul Robeson, 1951

In 2010, historian Thaddeus Russell described Marcantonio as "one of the greatest champions of black civil rights during the 1930s and 1940s." He sponsored bills to prohibit the poll tax, used by the Southern United States to disenfranchise poor voters, and to make lynching a federal crime.

Historian G. J. Meyer noted,

In the House, Marcantonio distinguished himself as the major leader for civil rights legislation by sponsoring anti-lynching and anti-poll tax bills as well as the annual fight for the Fair Employment Practices Commission's appropriation.

Marcantonio partnered with Congressman Leo Isacson to champion the cause of equality in the United States Armed Forces.

=== Economic policy ===
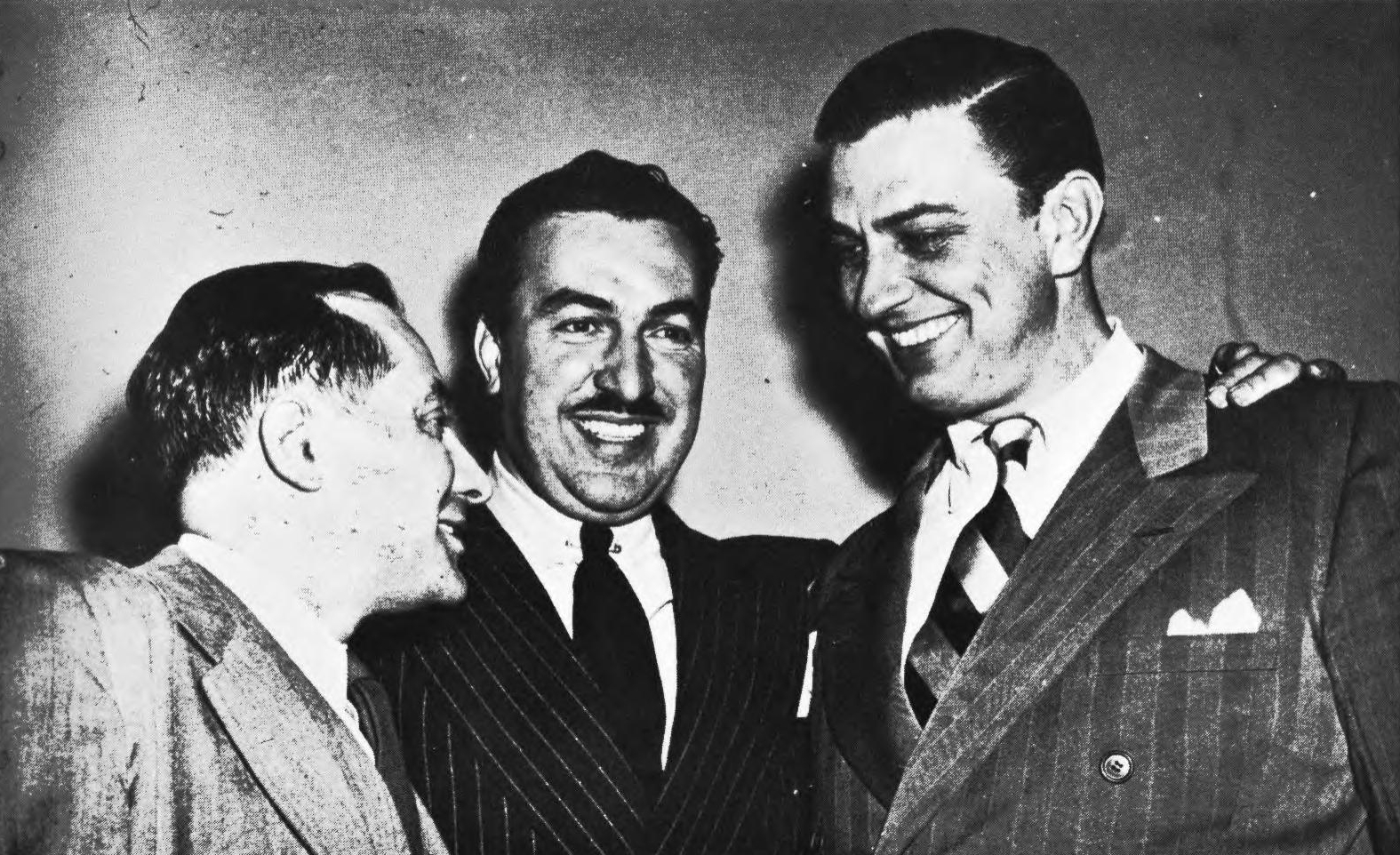
Marcantonio (left), Adam Clayton Powell Jr. (center) and Franklin D. Roosevelt Jr., three congressmen unsuccessful in their attempt to save the Fair Employment Practice Committee, February 23, 1950

Marcantonio supported the New Deal. While speaking on the subject of unemployment, Marcantonio remarked in Congress, "the unemployed are victims of an unjust economic and social system which has failed."

=== Military policy ===
In the early stages of World War II, Marcantonio opposed American entry, arguing that the war was actually an imperialist effort fueled by a desire by the conflicting powers to expand their economic exploitation of other peoples, remarking,

A war between two axes, the Wall Street-Downing Street Axis versus the Rome-Tokyo-Berlin Axis, contending for empire and for exploitation of more and more people.

In 1940, he was involved in forming the American Peace Mobilization to oppose American entry into the war. He also opposed U.S. involvement in the Korean War.

=== Freedom of expression ===
In 1941, as an attorney Marcantonio represented Dale Zysman, a high school coach and board member of the New York City Teachers Union also known as Jack Hardy, a communist writer for International Publishers, in a New York Board of Education hearing. Marcantonio asked for a ten-day stay because the Board had failed to present "an itemized bill of particulars", which stay the Board denied. Zysman walked out.

=== Puerto Rico ===
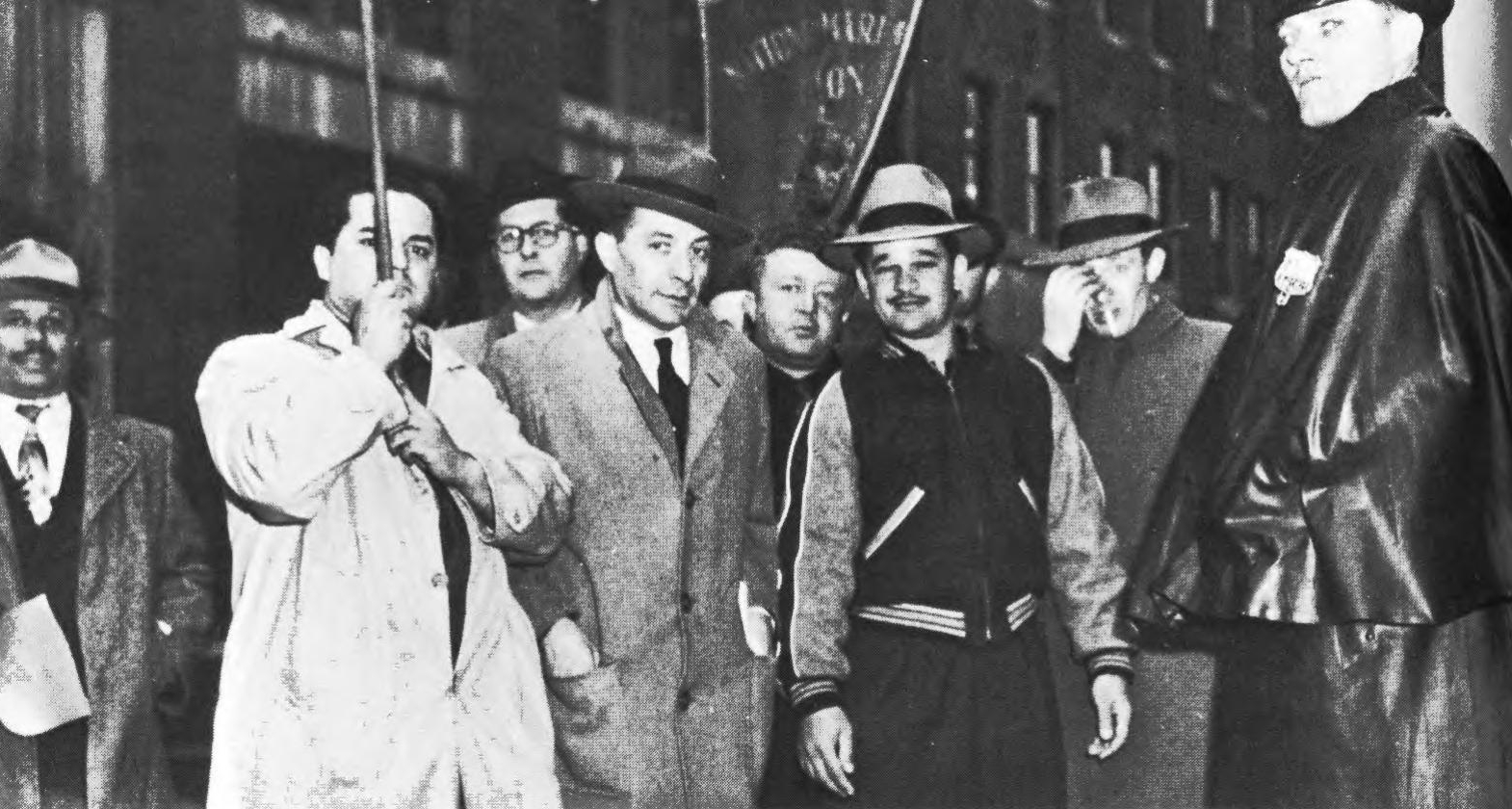
Marcantonio with striking Puerto Rican workers, undated

Marcantonio served as a strong voice in Congress for concerns relating to the territory of Puerto Rico, which lacked congressional representation. Historian G. J. Meyer noted,

He served as de facto congressperson for Puerto Rico, insuring that it was not excluded from appropriations bills. He also submitted five bills calling for the independence of Puerto Rico (which he called "the greatest victim of United States imperialism") with an indemnity for the damage done to the island by the United States business interests which had replaced tens of thousands of small farms with sugar plantations.

In 1939, Marcantonio criticized the prosecution and conviction of Puerto Rican Nationalist Party president Pedro Albizu Campos on charges of sedition and other crimes against the United States.

In 1946, Marcantonio introduced legislation to restore Spanish as the language of instruction in Puerto Rico's schools, asking President Harry S. Truman to sign the bill "in the name of the children of Puerto Rico who are being tortured by the prevailing system…to fight cultural chauvinism and to correct past errors." President Truman signed the bill. In 1948, schools were able to return to teaching in the Spanish language, but English was required in schools as a second language.

== Personal life ==
Marcantonio was a lifelong Catholic, who, in 1939 at the National Conference of the ILD, described himself as "a Roman Catholic who has not deserted the faith of his fathers." He married Miriam A. Sanders in 1925.

== Legacy ==
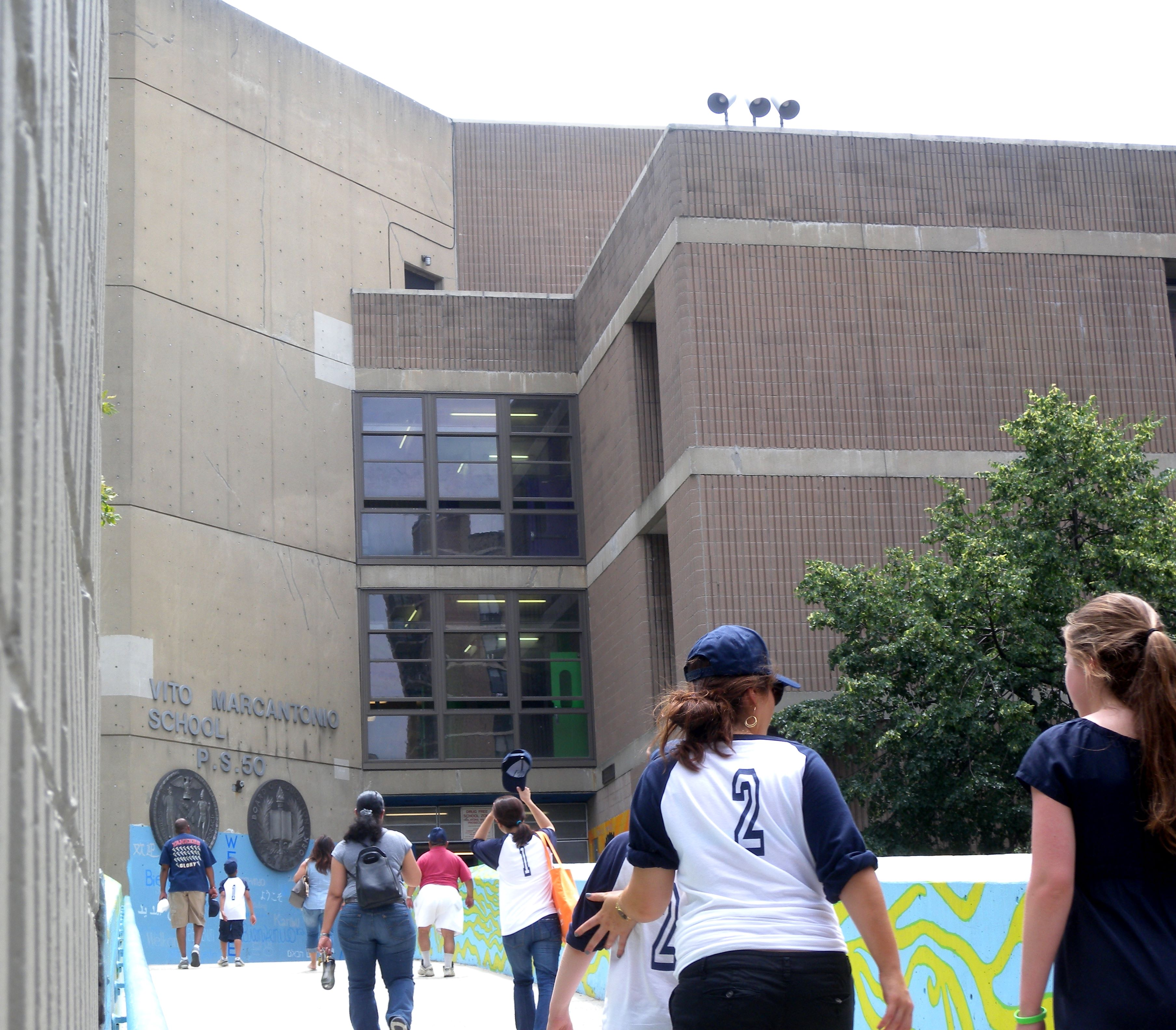
Public School 50 Vito Marcantonio in East Harlem, 2010

Marcantonio's collection of speeches, I Vote My Conscience (1956), edited by Annette Rubinstein, influenced the next generation of young radicals. His defense of workers rights, his mastery of parliamentary procedure, his ability to relate to the workers in his district while also engaging in worldwide issues, made him a hero to a certain section of the left. Rubinstein's book was reprinted in a new edition in 2002.

Tony Kushner's play The Intelligent Homosexual's Guide to Capitalism and Socialism with a Key to the Scriptures has a main character who is a fictional "cousin" of Vito Marcantonio.

== Works ==
Pamphlets written by Marcantonio include:

- We Accuse! (1938)
- Labor's Martyrs': Haymarket 1887, Sacco and Vanzetti 1927 (1941)
- Should America Go to War? (1941)
- Marcantonio Answers F.D.R.! (1941)
- Security with FDR (1944)

== Works cited ==
- Soyer, Daniel (2021). Left in the Center: The Liberal Party of New York and the Rise and Fall of American Social Democracy. Cornell University Press. ISBN 9781501759888. JSTOR 10.7591/j.ctv1hw3x50.2.

U.S. House of Representatives
| Preceded by James J. Lanzetta | Member of the U.S. House of Representatives from New York's 20th congressional district 1935–1937 | Succeeded by James J. Lanzetta |
| Preceded by James J. Lanzetta | Member of the U.S. House of Representatives from New York's 20th congressional district 1939–1945 | Succeeded by Sol Bloom |
| Preceded by Martin J. Kennedy | Member of the U.S. House of Representatives from New York's 18th congressional district 1945–1951 | Succeeded by James G. Donovan |
Party political offices
| Preceded by None | American Labor Nominee for Mayor of New York City; 1949 | Succeeded by Paul Ross |
