= Alfred E. Santangelo =

American lawyer and politician

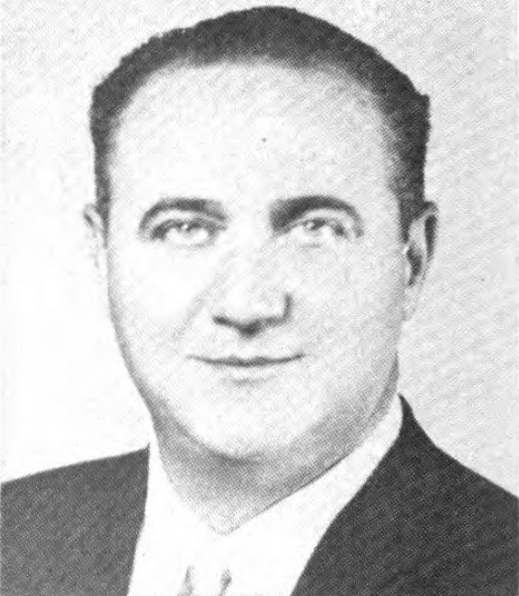

Member of the U.S. House of Representatives from New York
- In office January 3, 1957 – January 3, 1963
- Preceded by: James G. Donovan
- Succeeded by: Adam Clayton Powell Jr.
- Constituency: 18th district

Personal details
- Born: Alfred Edward Santangelo; June 4, 1912 New York
- Died: March 30, 1978 (aged 65) Orlando, Florida
- Resting place: Calvary Cemetery and Mausoleum in Woodside, Queens County, New York
- Party: Democratic

Alfred Edward Santangelo (June 4, 1912 – March 30, 1978) was an American lawyer and politician from New York. From 1957 to 1963, he served three terms in the U.S. House of Representatives.

== Life ==
Santangelo was born on June 4, 1912, in New York City. He graduated from Curtis High School, Staten Island. He graduated from City College of New York where he joined Alpha Phi Delta in 1935, and Columbia Law School in 1938.

=== Political career ===
He was a member of the New York State Senate (22nd D.) from 1947 to 1950, sitting in the 166th and 167th New York State Legislatures. In 1950, he ran for re-election, but was defeated by Republican William J. Bianchi.

Santangelo was again a member of the State Senate from 1953 to 1956, sitting in the 169th and 170th New York State Legislatures.

==== Congress ====
He was elected as a Democrat to the 85th, 86th and 87th United States Congresses, holding office from January 3, 1957, to January 3, 1963. After redistricting, due to the 1960 Census, Santangelo ran in November 1962 for re-election in New York's 24th congressional district, but was defeated by Republican Paul A. Fino.

=== Death and burial ===
He died on March 30, 1978, in Orlando, Florida and is buried in Calvary Cemetery and Mausoleum in Woodside, Queens County, New York.

== Sources ==
- United States Congress. "Alfred E. Santangelo (id: S000057)". Biographical Directory of the United States Congress.

New York State Senate
Preceded by Richard A. DiCostanzo	New York State Senate; 22nd District; 1947–1950	Succeeded by William J. Bianchi
Preceded by William J. Bianchi	New York State Senate; 22nd District; 1953–1956	Succeeded by John P. Morrissey
U.S. House of Representatives
Preceded by James G. Donovan	Member of the U.S. House of Representatives from New York's 18th congressional district 1957–1963	Succeeded by Adam Clayton Powell Jr.
