= James G. Donovan =

American politician

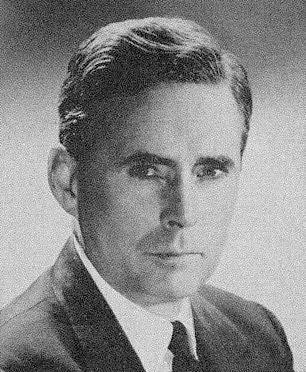

Member of the U.S. House of Representatives from New York's 18th district
- In office January 3, 1951 – January 3, 1957
- Preceded by: Vito Marcantonio
- Succeeded by: Alfred E. Santangelo

Member of the New York State Senate from the 16th district
- In office January 1, 1943 – December 31, 1944
- Preceded by: Thomas G. Brennan
- Succeeded by: William Rosenblatt

Undersheriff of New York County
- In office 1934–1941

Personal details
- Born: James George Donovan; December 15, 1898 Clinton, Massachusetts, US
- Died: April 6, 1987 (aged 88) New York City, US
- Resting place: Woodlawn Cemetery
- Party: Democratic
- Education: Harvard University; Columbia Law School
- Occupation: Lawyer; politician

Military service
- Branch/service: United States Navy
- Battles/wars: World War I

James George Donovan (December 15, 1898 – April 6, 1987) was an American lawyer and politician from New York, serving three terms in the U.S. House of Representatives from 1951 to 1957.

== Biography ==
Donovan was born on December 15, 1898, in Clinton, Massachusetts. He attended the Massachusetts Institute of Technology from 1916 to 1917. He served in the United States Navy during World War I. He graduated from Harvard University in 1922. He graduated from Columbia Law School in 1924. Active in politics as a Tammany Hall Democrat, he was Undersheriff of New York County from 1934 to 1941.

=== Political career ===
He was a member of the New York State Senate (16th D.) in 1943 and 1944.

=== Congress ===
In an effort to unseat American Labor Party congressman Vito Marcantonio, in 1950, he ran for Congress on both the Democratic and Republican party ballot lines. He was elected to the 82nd Congress, and won reelection to the 83rd and 84th United States Congresses, holding office from January 3, 1951, to January 3, 1957. In 1956, he ran unsuccessfully for reelection as a Republican after having been denied renomination by Tammany Hall, and was defeated by Alfred E. Santangelo.

=== Later career and death ===
After leaving Congress, in 1957 Donovan was New York State Director of the Federal Housing Administration. He then resumed practicing law, and maintained an office in New York City until retiring in 1965.

He died on April 6, 1987, in New York City. He was buried at Woodlawn Cemetery in the Bronx.

== Sources ==
- United States Congress. "James G. Donovan (id: D000421)". Biographical Directory of the United States Congress.

New York State Senate
Preceded by Thomas G. Brennan	New York State Senate; 16th District; 1943–1944	Succeeded by William Rosenblatt
U.S. House of Representatives
Preceded by Vito Marcantonio	Member of the U.S. House of Representatives from New York's 18th congressional district 1951–1957	Succeeded by Alfred E. Santangelo
