= Isaac Shorr =

American immigration lawyer

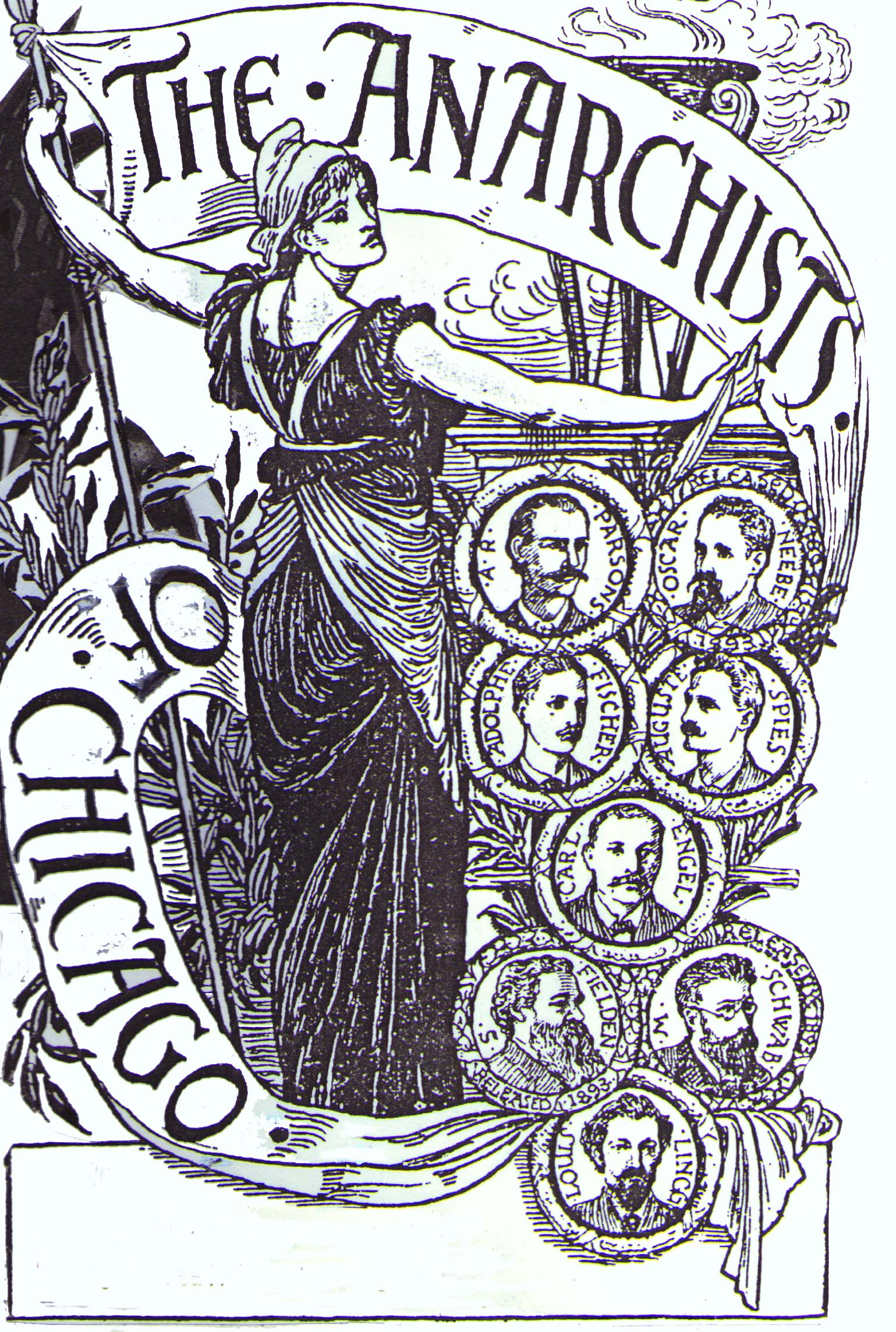
Engraving by Walter Crane of executed "Anarchists of Chicago" after the Haymarket affair (1886), an event that affected Shorr and many in his generation

Isaac Shorr (ca. 1882–1964) was a 20th-century American immigration and naturalization lawyer and philosophical anarchist who worked with other important, radical lawyers in the 1920s–1940s and whose legal partners included: Swinburne Hale, Walter Nelles, Joseph R. Brodsky, and Carol Weiss King.

== Background ==
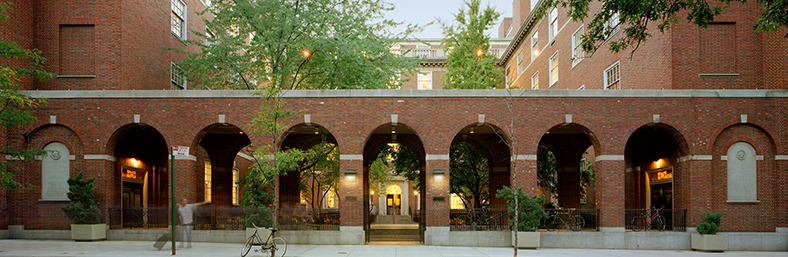
New York University School of Law's Vanderbilt Hall, where Shorr studied

Isaac Shorr was born about 1882 in Russia (at that time, the Russian Empire). In 1904, his family emigrated to the United States. In 1913, he graduated from New York University School of Law after studying at night and working by day as a cigarmaker. In 1915, he was admitted to the New York bar.

== Career ==
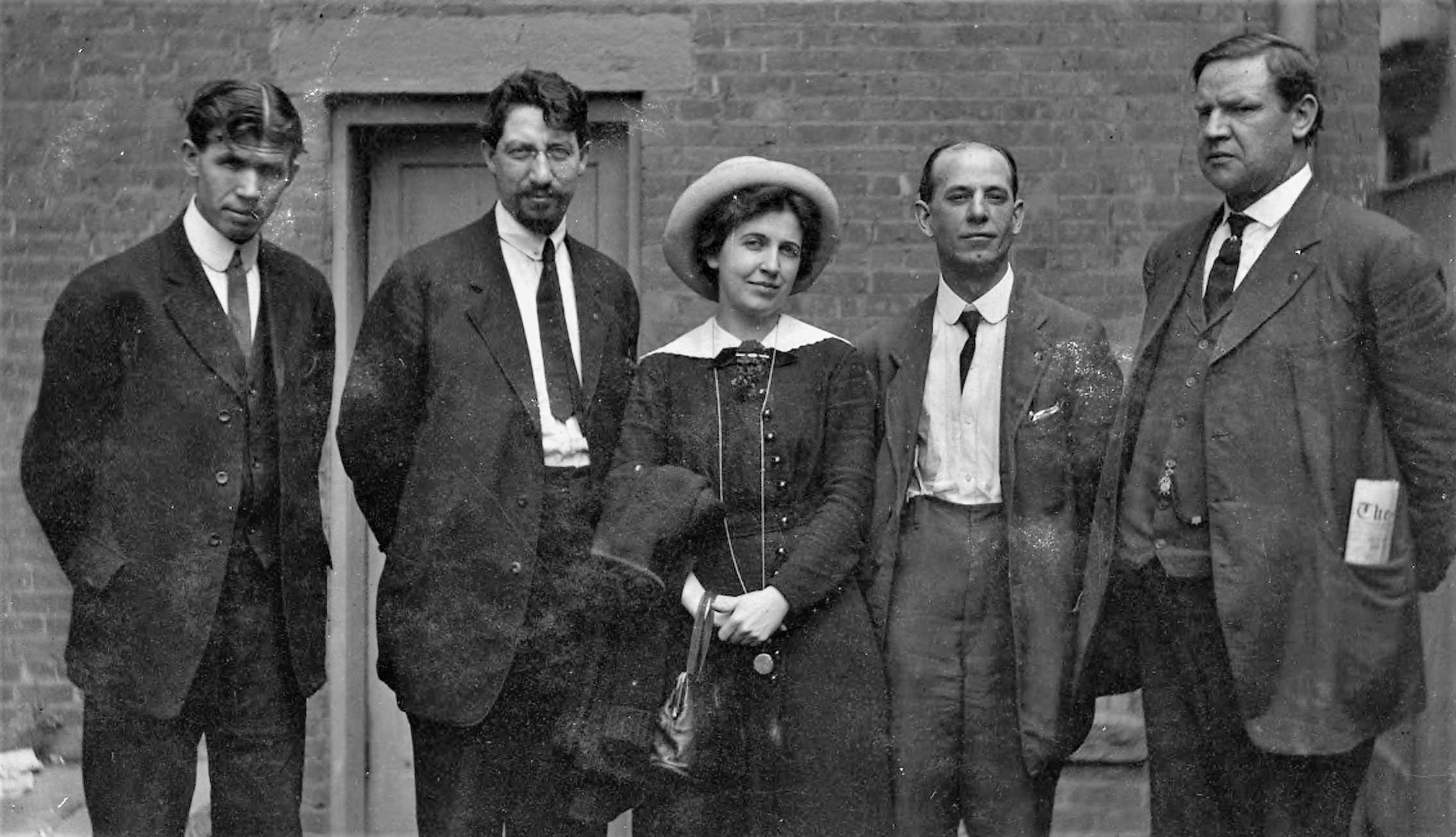
1913 photo of Paterson silk strike leaders Patrick Quinlan, Carlo Tresca, Elizabeth Gurley Flynn, Adolph Lessig, and Bill Haywood–Tresca was well known to Shorr and his law partners

During World War I, Shorr was a partner of Hale, Nelles, and Shorr, which "defended radicals." In 1920, Hale wrote to Tom Mooney, "We are in a hot bed of repression here, with only a very few lawyers who are willing and able to handle the situation, and who are hopelessly overworked." His partners were Swinburne Hale and Walter Nelles. Carlo Tresca, a prominent Italian anarchist, was well acquainted with them. Shorr and Nelles served as counsel to the American Civil Liberties Union (ACLU). The firm support legal investigations published in the 67-page Report upon the Illegal Practices of the United States Department of Justice by the National Popular Government League (NGPL); Swinburne Hale did a majority of the work on the report.

In 1920, Shorr testified before Congress that he was representing more than 60 people involved in deportation during the Palmer Raids. In fact, during the Palmer Raids, the U.S. Government noted:

Mr. Shorr is well known to the department because of his activities as attorney for these people. He many times has appeared as attorney for salients who have never seen him until the hearing and disclaimed any knowledge of his retainer. Mr. Shorr is one of the most active leaders of these people in the United States, and at the present time his office is the address at which persons in this country receive incendiary correspondence from persons deported on the Buford.

Joseph R. Brodsky and Carol Weiss King worked with this firm, as did Vito Marcantonio (whose mentor was Brodsky).

In 1924, Shorr and Nelles appealed United States ex rel. Tisi v. Tod (1924) and United States ex rel. Mensevich v. Tod before the U.S. Supreme Court.

By 1924, Shorr was a member of "Shorr, Brodsky, and King" (also called "Brodsky, King & Shorr," called a "loose" partnership). The other two partners were:

- Joseph R. Brodsky, chief counsel of the International Labor Defense (ILD), legal arm of the Communist Party of the USA (then the Workers Party of America, best known for his work on the legal defense team of the Scottsboro Boys
- Carol Weiss King, the youngest, who was just starting her career as immigration and civil rights lawyer, best known for her defense of alleged Communists Harry Bridges, Gerhart Eisler, and J. Peters

Brodsky helped found the ILD with King's help; King founded the International Juridical Association (IJA) with Brodsky's help.

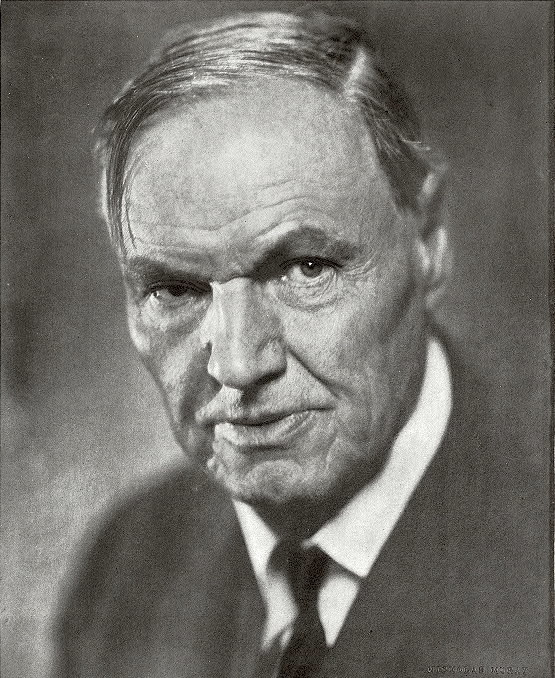
Clarence Darrow circa 1925, whom Shorr helped defend two Italian anti-fascists in 1927

In 1927, Shorr associated with Clarence Darrow and Arthur Garfield Hays to help defend the anti‐Fascists Calogero Greco and Donato Carillo for the alleged murder of the Fascist Joseph Carisi (Giuseppe Carisi) in the Bronx. On December 9, 1927, the trial began, and the full defense team included Darrow, Hays, Shorr, and King. They won an acquittal.

In 1934, the American Committee for Protection of Foreign Born (ACPFB) retained Shorr and King defended Domenico Sallitti (also known as Domenic Sallitti, an "alien anarchist") in the Ferrero-Sallitti Case in San Francisco. Sallitti's friend Valerio Isca organized their defense, created a Ferrero-Sallittii Defense Conference, and enlisted Rose Pesotta of the ILGWU to help raise bail. Supporters likened their case to that of Sacco and Vanzetti.

== Personal and death ==
Shorr married Bessie Goldenburg; they had two daughters.

He was a "ponderous, philosophical anarchist."

Shorr died aged 82 on April 23, 1964.

Shorr's grandson Gene Weingarten is a Washington Post journalist who has won two Pulitzer Prizes for feature writing.

== See also ==
- Palmer Raids
- Swinburne Hale
- Walter Nelles
- Joseph R. Brodsky
- International Labor Defense
- Carol Weiss King
- International Juridical Association
- Clarence Darrow
- Arthur Garfield Hays
