= Walter Nelles =

American lawyer and legal scholar and activist

Walter Nelles (April 21, 1883 – April 1, 1937) was an American lawyer and law professor. Nelles is best remembered as the co-founder and first chief legal counsel of the National Civil Liberties Bureau and its successor, the American Civil Liberties Union. In this connection, Nelles achieved public notice for his legal work on behalf of pacifists charged with violating the Espionage Act during World War I and in other politically charged civil rights and constitutional law cases in later years.

== Background ==
Walter Nelles was born April 21, 1883, in Leavenworth, Kansas, the son of George Thomas Nelles, a civil engineer. Nelles attended the prestigious Phillips Exeter Academy in Exeter, New Hampshire, in preparation for an Ivy League collegiate education. Upon graduation from Exeter, Nelles enrolled in Harvard University, from which he graduated in 1905 with a Bachelor's degree.

After graduation, Nelles taught as an instructor at the University of Wisconsin from the fall of 1905 to the spring of 1907. Nelles then left Madison to return to Harvard, receiving a Master's degree in 1908 before moving on Harvard Law School. He graduated from Harvard Law with an LL.B. in 1911. During the period of his graduate education, Nelles also taught as an instructor at Lowell Institute and Radcliffe College.

== Career ==
After passing the bar examination, Nelles entered private legal practice.

=== Law practice ===
During World War I, Nelles was a partner in the law firm of Hale, Nelles & Shorr.

Nelles defended Communist Party co-founder Benjamin Gitlow for half a decade. In 1920, Nelles and Murray C. Bernay served of counsel to defend Gitlow in People vs. Gitlow on behalf of the National Civil Liberties Bureau (soon renamed the American Civil Liberties Union or ACLU), then Nelles and Charles Recht on appeal. From 1923 to 1925 on behalf of the ACLU, Nelles and a young Walter Pollak argued Gitlow v. New York before the United States Supreme Court against a conviction for "advocacy of criminal anarchy." The court upheld Gitlow's conviction but recognized that the Due Process Clause of the Fourteenth Amendment incorporated, which protected fundamental provisions of the Bill of Rights, including the freedom of speech. (New York State Governor Al Smith commuted Gitlow's sentence.)

Throughout the 1920s, Nelles participated in a loose partnership of left-wing attorneys, including Joseph R. Brodsky, Swinburne Hale, Carol Weiss King, and Isaac Shorr. The firm support legal investigations published in the 67-page Report upon the Illegal Practices of the United States Department of Justice by the National Popular Government League (NGPL); Swinburne Hale did a majority of the work on the report.

In 1920, Nelles served on the defense team of the five Socialist members of the New York State Assembly who were denied the right to assume the seats to which they had been elected by the Republican Speaker of the House Thaddeus C. Sweet, working in concert with members of both the Republican and Democratic Parties.

The liberal Nelles also sought to mediate sectarian fighting among American radicals, sitting with Roger Baldwin and others on a special committee established in August 1922 to investigate charges levied by Abraham Cahan and The Jewish Daily Forward that the Friends of Soviet Russia (FSR) organization (for which he served as attorney) was engaged in the misappropriation of funds raised for the relief of famine in Soviet Russia. The committee ultimately exonerated the FSR of these charges, but Nelles declined to sign the final report because he was appointed as a law partner as counsel for that organization, a circumstance that created a potential conflict of interest.

In 1924, Nelles and Shorr appealed United States ex rel. Tisi v. Tod (1924) and United States ex rel. Mensevich v. Tod before the U.S. Supreme Court.

=== American Civil Liberties Union ===
Shorr and Nelles served as counsel to the American Civil Liberties Union (ACLU).

Holding pacifist beliefs himself, following the entry of the United States into World War I in April 1917 Nelles was persuaded by his old college classmate Roger Baldwin to leave his practice to become house counsel for the fledgling National Civil Liberties Bureau (NCLB) of the American Union Against Militarism that Baldwin had helped launch. This organization, based in New York City, would eventually emerge as the American Civil Liberties Union.

The Civil Liberties Bureau in its first years dealt primarily with cases involving conscientious objectors and political opponents of the war who faced charges under the so-called Espionage Act. Among those high-profile cases which Nelles handled included the trial of the American Socialist Society and its Rand School of Social Science and the trial of Max Eastman and his publication, The Masses.

The offices of the National Civil Liberties Bureau were raided by the Department of Justice on August 30, 1918, by agents who seized all of Nelles' files. The raid was based upon invalid search warrants.

Nelles and Baldwin were joined in the main office of the National Civil Liberties Bureau by Albert DeSilver, a lawyer who left private practice to work full-time on the defense of civil liberties in the courts. The troika guided the activities of the NCLB and the successor ACLU in its earliest years. Roger Baldwin later fondly recalled their partnership:

We made a team which was never after equalled in the American Civil Liberties Union. DeSilver contributed the quick unerring judgment, with a gay and easy approach to tough problems; Nelles, the reflective opinions of a studious lawyer sometimes aroused by hot indignations; and I, the techniques of the social case worker, an organizer and a publicity man for such limited publicity as was open to us.

The three men "loved each other," Lucille B. Milner, secretary of the NCLB remembered. The team was abruptly shattered when DeSilver was killed in a fall from a railroad car in 1924, dying at the age of 36. Nelles later memorialized his fallen colleague by writing his biography, published by W.W. Norton & Co. in 1940.

=== Academic career ===
Nelles later served on the faculty of Yale Law School where he often taught courses on the history of labor injunctions.

== Personal life and death ==
Nelles was a social democrat and a member of the League for Industrial Democracy during the 1920s. At the time of his death he was regarded by friends as a liberal rather than a socialist.

Walter Nelles died at the age of 53 on April 1, 1937, in New Haven, Connecticut, following a brief illness.

== Works ==
=== Books and pamphlets ===
- Espionage Act Cases, with Certain Others on Related Points: New Law in Making as to Criminal Utterance in War-time (1918)
- Seeing Red: Civil Liberty and Law in the Period Following the War (1920)
- A Liberal in Wartime: The Education of Albert DeSilver (1940)

=== Articles ===
- "Contempt by Publication in the United States," Part One: Columbia Law Review, vol. 28, no. 4 (April 1928), pp. 401–431; Part Two: vol. 28, no. 5 (May 1928) pp. 525–562. With Carol Weiss King. —Reissued as a pamphlet by the ACLU.
- "A Strike and its Legal Consequences: An Examination of the Receivership Precedent for the Labor Injunction," Yale Law Journal, vol. v. 40, no. 4 (February 1931), pp. 507–554.
- "The Summary Power to Punish for Contempt," Columbia Law Review, vol. 31, no. 6 (June 1931), pp. 956–974.
- "The First American Labor Case," Yale Law Journal,vol. 41, no. 2 (December 1931), pp. 165–200.
- "Commonwealth v. Hunt," Columbia Law Review,vol. 32, no. 7 (November 1932), pp. 1128–1169.
- "Towards Legal Understanding," Columbia Law Review, Part One: vol. 34, no. 5 (May 1934), pp. 862–889; Part Two: vol. 34, no. 6 (June 1934), pp. 1041–1075.

== See also ==
- American Civil Liberties Union
- Roger Baldwin
- Swinburne Hale
- Isaac Shorr
- Carol Weiss King
- Joseph R. Brodsky

== External sources ==
- Norman L. Meyers, "Walter Nelles," Yale Law Journal, vol. 46, no. 8 (June 1937), pp. 1279–1281.
