= Louis Weinstock =

American trade unionist and Communist Party leader

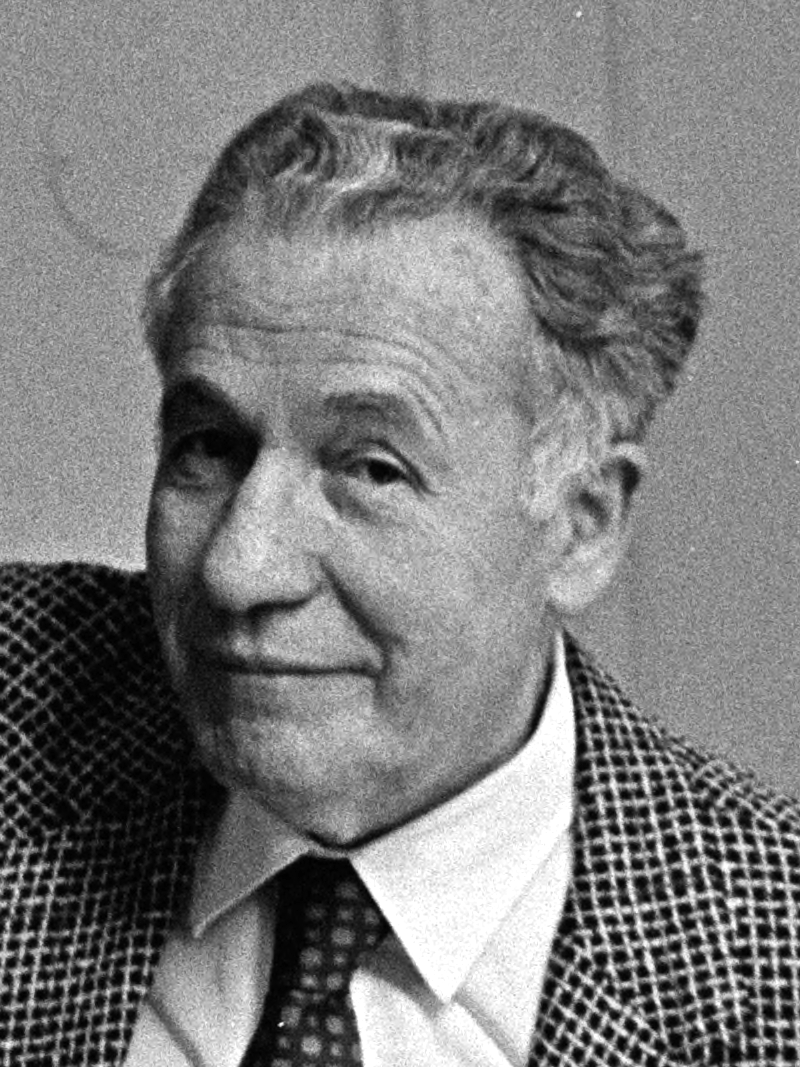
- Weinstock in 1972
- Born: May 14, 1903 (age 123); Tokaj, Austria-Hungary
- Died: November 26, 1994 (aged 91); Redlands, California, U.S.
- Occupation: Trade unionist
- Organizations: Brotherhood of Painters and Decorators of America; American Federation of Labor
- Known for: Smith Act Trials
- Political party: Communist Party USA

Louis Weinstock (May 14, 1903 – November 26, 1994) was a Hungarian-American trade unionist and leading functionary in the Communist Party USA.

== Background ==
Louis Weinstock was born on near Tokaj, Hungary on May 14, 1903, into a Jewish family.

== Career ==
Weinstock, newly-elected secretary-treasurer of Painters, District Council 9, about to deliver his inaugural address at the union's headquarters, 290 Seventh Ave., July 3, 1940

Weinstock emigrated to the United States in 1924, settling in New York City and working as a painter until he lost his job in the Great Depression and became involved in union organizing. In 1932, he became head of the AFL Trade Union Committee for Unemployment Insurance and Relief. In this position, he helped convince the AFL to support unemployment compensation for its members.

In 1936, Weinstock was elected secretary-treasurer of District Council 9 (representing New York City) of the Brotherhood of Painters and Decorators of America. Over the next 11 years he served as either secretary-treasurer or president, during which his leftist politics angered union leadership. On June 29, 1940, he was re-elected on a pro-Communist, anti-war "Rank and File" slate. In July 1946, he became a member of the Communist Party national board. He later served as the business manager of the Daily Worker. In 1951, Mátyás Rákosi told Joseph Starobin that Weinstock was an FBI informant but American leaders in the Party did not believe the accusation.

== Investigations ==
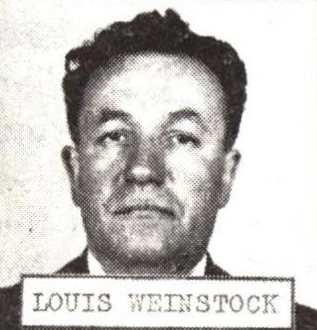
Weinstock's FBI mugshot, 1951

Weinstock was indicted under the Smith Act on June 20, 1950, along with twenty other leaders in the Party. Following his arrest, a group of 40 trade union leaders formed the Trade Union Committee to Defend Louis Weinstock to support his legal defense. On February 3, 1953, he was found guilty of violating the Smith Act and sentenced to three years in prison. While in prison, he became friends with fellow inmate Dashiell Hammett and he later attended Hammett's funeral in 1961. In August 1959, Weinstock was subpoenaed to testify in front of the House Un-American Activities Committee with 10 other teachers from the Faculty of Social Science, as part of the Committee's investigation into Communist teachers.

== Death ==
Weinstock died of heart failure in Redlands, California on November 26, 1994.
