= Oliver Larkin =

Oliver Larkin may refer to:

- Oliver W. Larkin, an American art historian
- Oliver Larkin (politician), an American politician
