= Morris Katz =

Polish-American painter (1932–2010)

- Born: Moshe Katz; 5 March 1932; Galicia, Poland
- Died: 12 November 2010 (aged 78); Bronx, New York
- Other name: Moshe Katz
- Occupation: Painter
- Known for: Painting US Presidents, Fastest Toilet Paper Painter, Finishing a painting in a record 30 seconds

Morris Katz (born Moshe Katz on March 5, 1932 – November 12, 2010) was a Polish-American painter. He holds two Guinness World Records as the world's fastest painter and most prolific artist. He was known as the "King of Schlock Art" and the "King of Toilet Paper Art" due to his unique painting technique using a palette knife and toilet tissue instead of a paintbrush.

On October 1, 1985, Morris broke Pablo Picasso's record as the world’s most prolific artist at the Art Students League in New York City. As a Holocaust survivor, Morris showed his gratitude to the United States by undertaking his longest and most cherished project, the President Collection. Using his Instant Art method, Morris spent six years painting each US president in the “Old Master” style, averaging 200 hours per portrait. Each portrait includes the US flag with the exact number of stars per state for each president. The collection was popular worldwide. He sold millions of postcards to collectors. In 1965, Morris was commissioned by the Vatican to paint a portrait of Pope Paul VI, which sold 3 million copies worldwide.

== Early life ==
Katz was born in Galicia, Poland in 1932 and studied under Dr. Hans Fokler of the Munich Academy at age 13. During the Holocaust, he endured Nazi concentration camps and lost most of his family. After World War II, he lived in a displaced persons camp where he earned a diploma in carpentry, and later said that toilet paper was his "diploma in art".

In 1949, Morris moved to the United States and worked as a carpenter while pursuing his art. He began using a palette knife instead of brushes while working on his unpublished Dictionary of Color in 1956 and later experimented with rags before turning to toilet tissue, using almost 10,000 rolls per year for his paintings.

By February 2007, Morris had painted over 280,000 paintings. He was also a painter, comedian, and television personality, hosting and producing over 600 TV shows using his Instant Art Method.

== Instant Art ==
On May 9, 1988, Katz set a new Guinness World Record by painting a 12- by 16-inch canvas of a child in just 30 seconds. He called his method “Instant Art” due to the speed at which he completed his paintings.

In 1987, Katz completed 103 paintings in 12 hours at an event benefiting the Boy Scouts of America, selling 55 pieces on the spot. He was listed as a human oddity in Ripley's Believe It Or Not for his ability to paint full works of art in less than five minutes.

A 2003 review of one of his serious paintings stated that "normally this artist's works are notable only for their carefree and speedy execution, but this painting is a welcome exception."

== Death ==
An obituary described him as creating “instant art” and entertaining generations of guests in the old Borscht Belt hotels. Katz died on November 12, 2010, at the age of 78 after suffering a stroke.
