= Swinburne Hale =

American poet

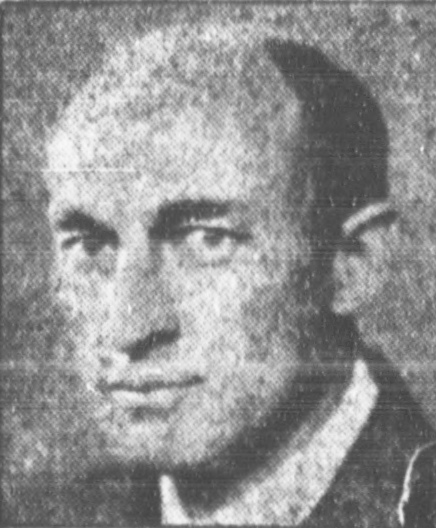
Swinburne Hale (circa 1921)

Swinburne Hale (April 5, 1884 – July 3, 1937) was an American lawyer, poet, and socialist, best remembered as one of the leading civil rights attorneys of the 1920s. Hale was a Harvard College classmate of Roger Nash Baldwin and law partner of Walter Nelles and Isaac Shorr and was active in the establishment and early work of the American Civil Liberties Union (ACLU). Hale also played a role in the progressive politics of the early 1920s as a leading member of the Committee of Forty-Eight and a spokesman for the fledgling Farmer-Labor Party.

== Background ==
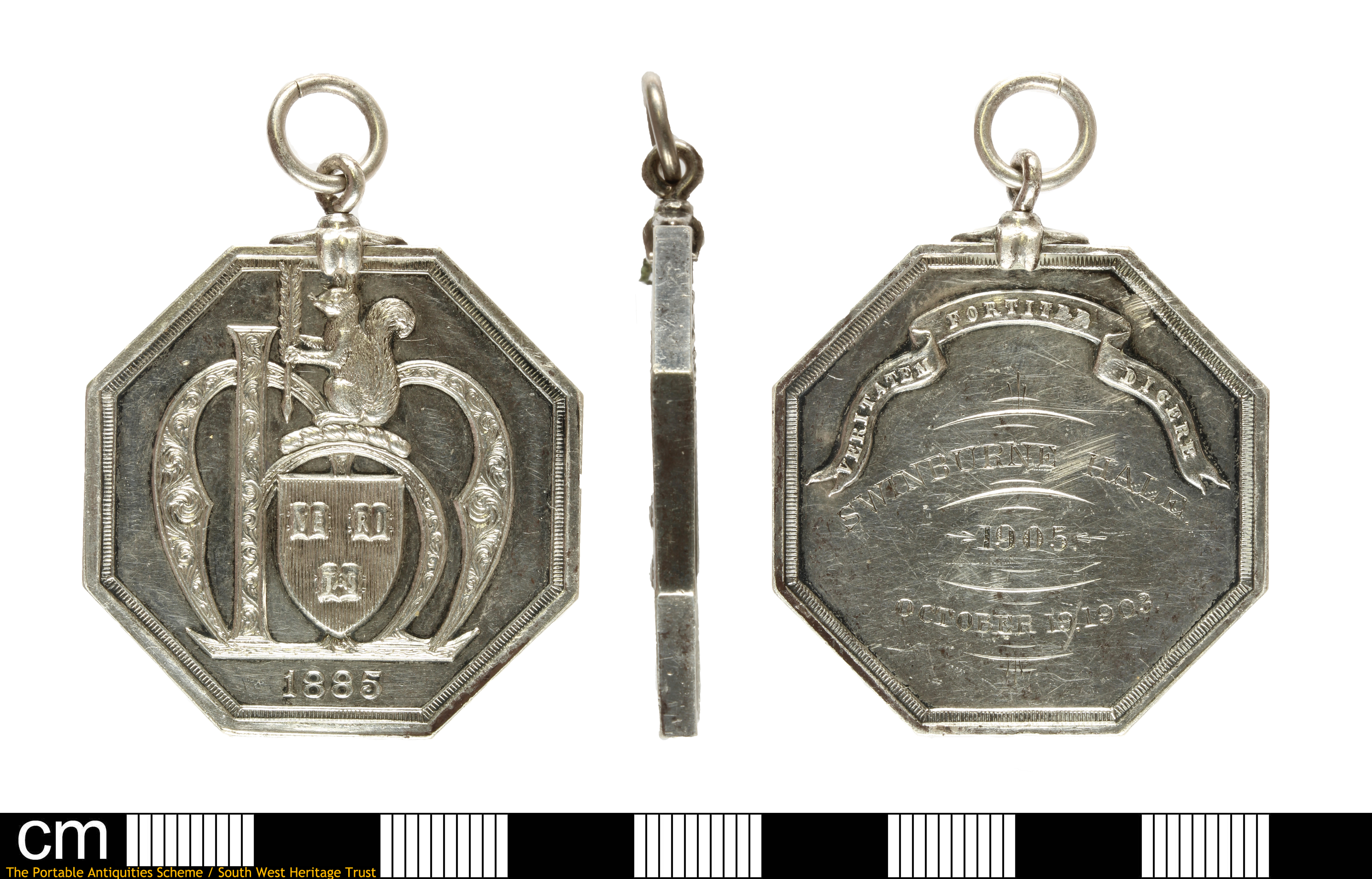
Harvard Monthly medal awarded to Hale in 1905

Swinburne Hale was born on April 5, 1884, in Ithaca, New York, one of four children of Latin scholar William Gardner Hale, head of the Latin Department at the University of Chicago. His mother Harriett Knowles Swinburne was college-educated and active in the women's suffrage movement. In 1905, Hale received his Bachelor of Arts from Harvard University, where he lived in Grays Hall during freshman year. In 1908, he received an LLB from Harvard Law School.

== Career ==
Hale moved to Greenwich Village in New York City, where he came to know many writers and artists while practicing as a lawyer. By 1912, he was already an outspoken advocate for women's suffrage.

Hale was a member of the law firm of Hale, Nelles, and Shorr, which "defended radicals." His partners were Isaac Shorr and Walter Nelles. Carlo Tresca, a prominent Italian anarchist, was well acquainted with them.

=== Publishing ===
In 1917, Hale helped publish a magazine called New France that focused on American reconstruction France after World War I.

=== World War I ===
In 1918, Hale became a captain in the Intelligence Division of General Staff of the United States Army.

=== Law and politics ===
After World War I, Hale "became more closely identified with Socialist activities," although his partner Walter Nelles described him as "not a Socialist but interested in socialism."

In 1919, Hale became a member of the Committee of 48, a progress party for social reform that went on to support Robert M. La Follette as presidential candidate for a Progressive Party in 1924. He also served as counsel for communists taken to Ellis Island for deportation as a result of the Palmer Raids that comprised the First Red Scare.

Hales was very active in 1920:

- He joined Alfred Bettman, former Special Assistant United States Attorney General in charge of sedition, in testifying before the Rules Committee of the United States House of Representatives.
- In July, he was active during a convention of the Committee of 48.
- In the fall, he served as publicist for the newly formed Farmer-Labor Party (FLP). In his efforts on behalf of the FLP, Hale was careful to delineate the differences between his fledgling organization and the rival Socialist Party of America (SPA), noting that while the SPA included only "simon-pure socialists," the FLP made a broader appeal, targeting not only wage-workers but also farmers, small business proprietors, and professionals.
- He wrote to Tom Mooney, "We are in a hot bed of repression here, with only a very few lawyers who are willing and able to handle the situation, and who are hopelessly overworked."

== Personal life and death ==
Walter Nelles was a personal friend of Hale's.

Hale married three times. In 1910, he married Beatrice Forbes-Robertson; they divorced in 1920. They had three daughters. In 1921, he married Marie Tudor Garland Green, a disinherited heiress. Between 1922 and 1924 while living mostly in Taos, New Mexico, Hale had an affair with artist Greta R. Hercz, and married her in November 1924, though it is unclear if he was still married at the time. The wedding was officiated by judge Frank W. Parker, and was reported in The Santa Fe New Mexican.

In 1925, Hale bought a coal yard in Westport, Connecticut, to remake into a studio with apartments as an artists and writers colony. Also in 1925, Hale suffered a nervous breakdown.

Swinburne Hale died age 53 on July 3, 1937, in a sanitarium in Westport, Connecticut.

== Legacy ==
His papers are housed at the New York Public Library in New York City, where they occupy 8 archival boxes and 1 oversized folder. The papers cover 1908-1924 with "primarily of personal correspondence" and "do not reflect his activities as a lawyer or his socialist sympathies."

== Works ==
Poetry:

- The Demon's Notebook: Verse and Perverse. New York: N.L. Brown, 1923

Law-Politics:

- Do We Need More Sedition Laws? : Testimony of Alfred Bettman and Swinburne Hale before the Committee on Rules of the House of Representatives. New York: American Civil Liberties Union, n.d. [1920].
- "Reds, Deportations, and Palmerism," in Alexander Trachtenberg and Benjamin Glassberg (eds.), The American Labor Year Book, 1921-1922. New York: Rand School of Social Science, n.d. [1921]; pp. 34–39.
