= Labor Defender =

1926–1937 US magazine

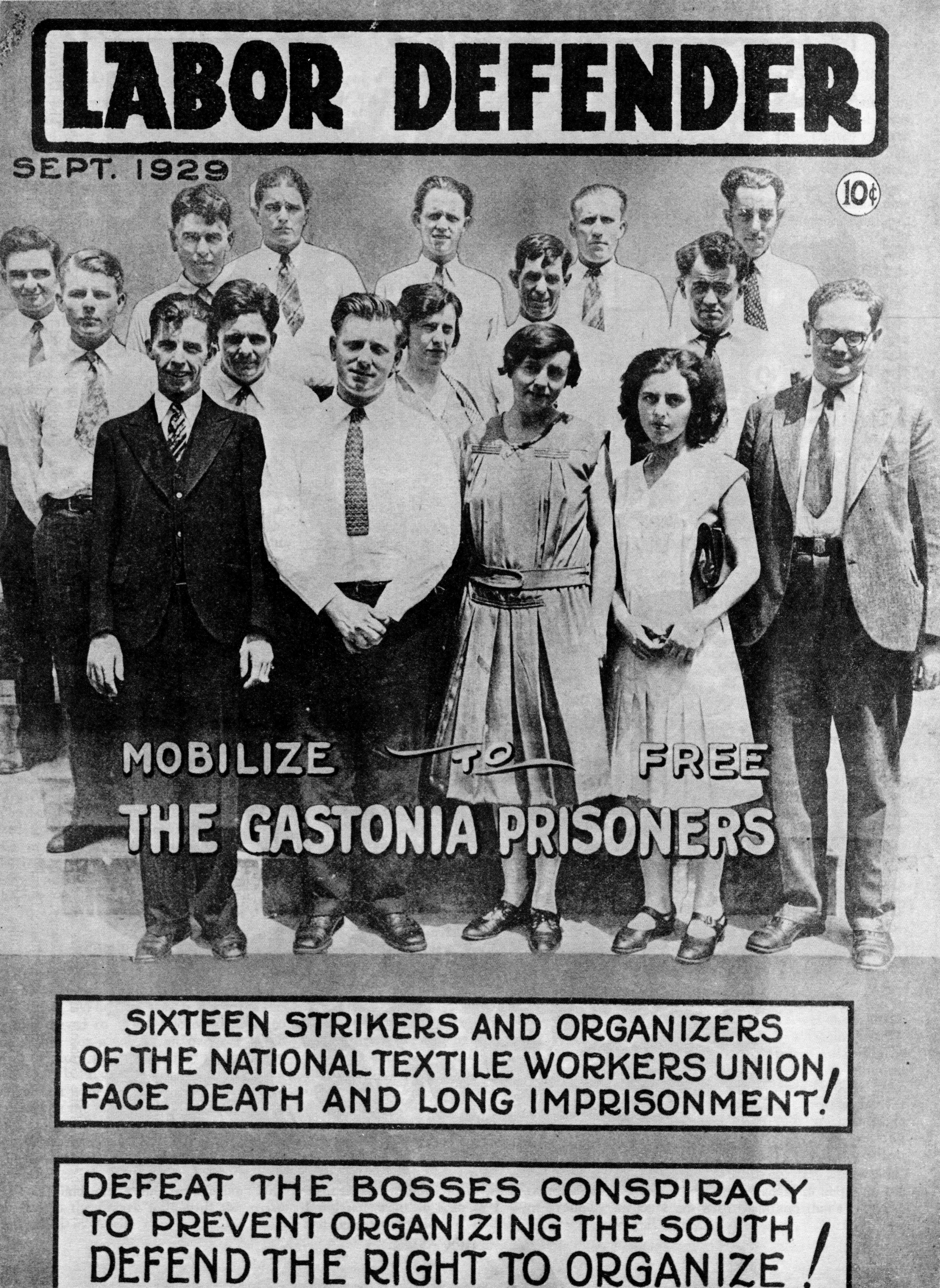
- Labor Defender (September 1929): workers imprisoned for Loray Mill strike
- Categories: Communist
- Frequency: Monthly
- Publisher: International Labor Defense
- Paid circulation: 5,500
- Unpaid circulation: 16,500 (bundle sales)
- Total circulation: 22,000 (1928)
- Founder: International Labor Defense
- Founded: January 1926
- First issue: January 1926
- Final issue Number: December 1937; Volume 13, No. 11
- Country: United States of America
- Based in: New York City
- Language: English

Labor Defender (1926–1937) was a magazine published by the International Labor Defense (ILD), itself a legal advocacy organization established in 1925 as the American section of the Comintern's International Red Aid network and thus as support to the Communist Party (which in 1926 was legally the Workers Party of America).

== History ==
In January 1926, the ILD began publishing Labor Defender, as a monthly, profusely illustrated magazine with a low cover price of 10 cents. Magazine circulation boomed. It rose from some 1,500 paid subscriptions and 8,500 copies in bulk bundle sales in 1927, to some 5,500 paid subscriptions with a bundle sale of 16,500 by mid-1928. This mid-1928 circulation figure was said by Assistant Secretary Marty Abern to be "greater than the combined circulation of The Daily Worker, Labor Unity, and The Communist combined."

== Outlook ==
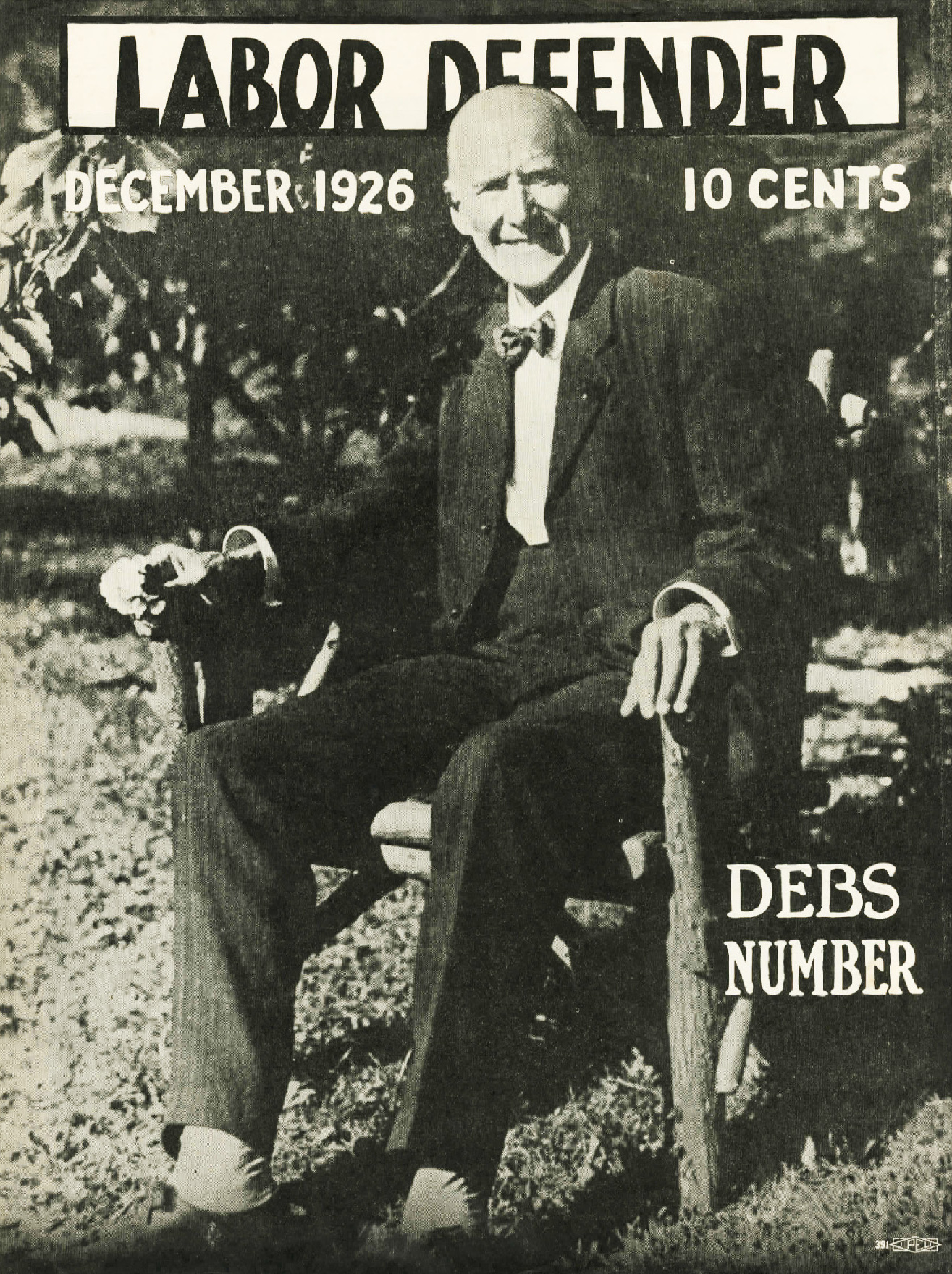
Eugene Debs
December 1926

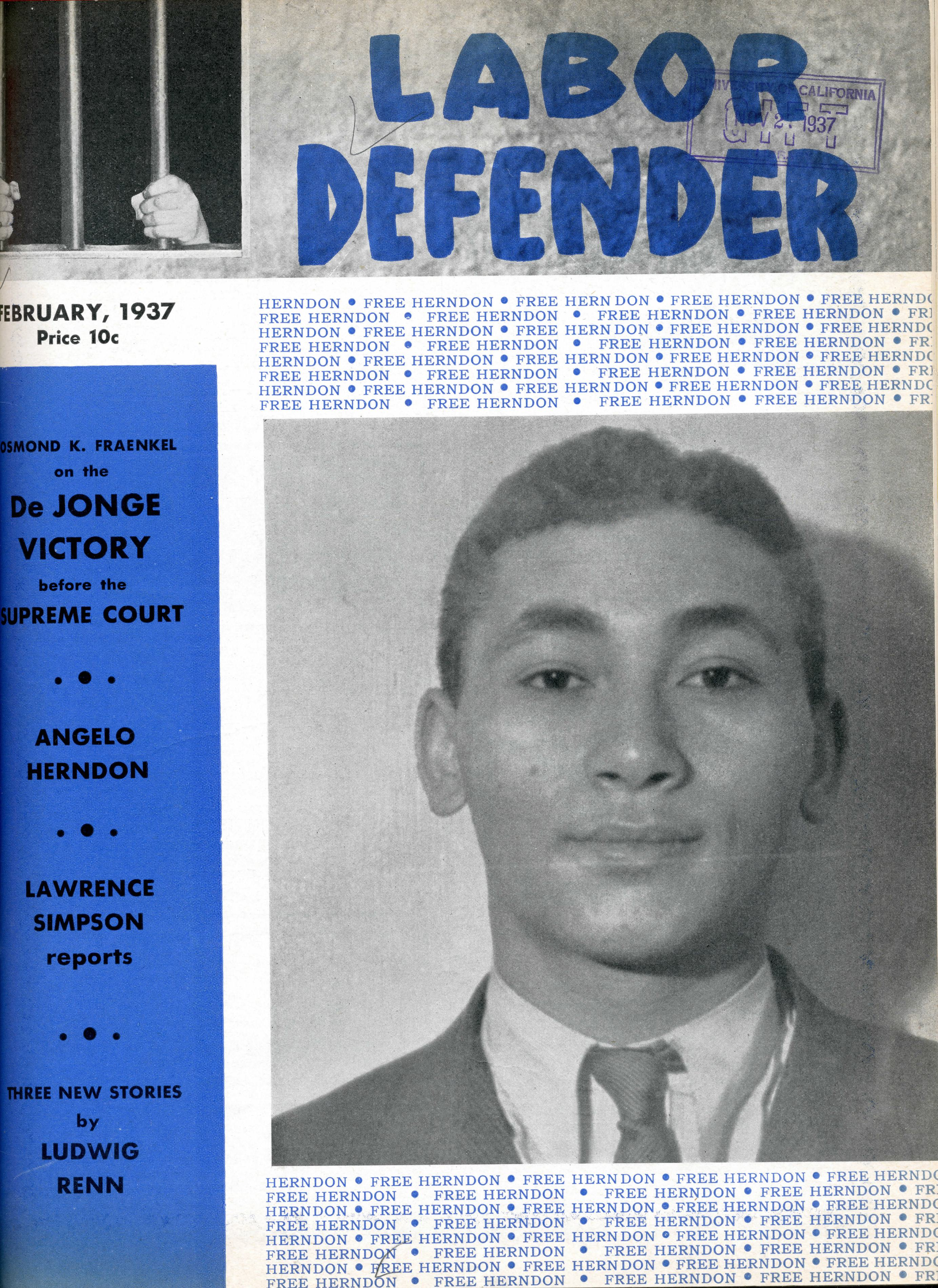
Angelo Herndon
February 1937

Labor Defender depicted a black-and-white world of heroic trade unionists and dastardly factory owners, of oppressed African Americans struggling for freedom against the Ku Klux Klan and the use of state terror to stifle and divide and destroy all opposition. Writers included prominent Communists such as trade union leader William Z. Foster, cartoonist Robert Minor, and Benjamin Gitlow, a former political prisoner in New York., as well as non-party voices like novelist Upton Sinclair, former Wobbly Ralph Chaplin, Socialist Party leader Eugene V. Debs, and Gavin Arthur, grandson of U.S. President Chester A. Arthur. Between April 1936 and December 1937, Sasha Small, Gavin Arthur, and communist poet Langston Hughes served as editors.

The magazine made a constant plea for additional funds for jailed labor activists across the country. A regular column called "Voices from Prison" highlighted the plight of those behind bars and reinforced the message that good work was being done on the behalf of the so-called "class war prisoners" of America.

== Masthead ==
The magazine's masthead included:

=== 1926 ===
January–August 1926

- Editor: T. J. O' Flaherty
- Business: George Maurer
- National Officers: Andrew T. McNamara (chairman), Edward C. Wentworth (Vice Chairman), James P. Cannon (Executive Secretary)

September–December 1926

- Editor: Max Shachtman
- Business: George Maurer
- National Officers: Andrew T. McNamara (chairman), Edward C. Wentworth (Vice Chairman), James P. Cannon (Executive Secretary)

=== 1927 ===
- Editor: Max Shachtman
- Business: George Maurer
- National Officers: Elizabeth Gurley Flynn (chairman), Edward C. Wentworth (Vice Chairman), James P. Cannon (Executive Secretary)

=== 1928 ===
January–November 1928

- Editor: Max Shachtman
- Business: George Maurer
- National Officers: Elizabeth Gurley Flynn (chairman), Edward C. Wentworth (Vice Chairman), James P. Cannon (Executive Secretary)

December 1928

- Editor: Karl Reeve
- Business: George Maurer
- National Officers: Elizabeth Gurley Flynn (chairman), Norman Tallentire (Assistant Secretary), Alfred Wagenknecht (Executive Secretary)

=== 1929 ===
January–April 1929

- Editor: Karl Reeve
- Business: George Maurer
- National Officers: Elizabeth Gurley Flynn (chairman), Norman T. Tallentire (Assistant Secretary), Alfred Wagenknecht (Executive Secretary)

May–June 1929

- Editor: Karl Reeve
- Business: Walt Carmon
- National Officers: Elizabeth Gurley Flynn (chairman), Edward G. Wentworth (Vice Chairman), Juliet Poyntz (Executive Secretary), Carl Kacker (Assistant Secretary)

July–August 1929

- Editor: Karl Reeve
- Business: Walt Carmon
- National Officers: Elizabeth Gurley Flynn (chairman), Edward G. Wentworth (Vice Chairman), Alfred Wagenknecht (Executive Secretary)

September–December 1929

- Editor: J. Louis Engdahl
- National Officers: Elizabeth Gurley Flynn (chairman), Edward G. Wentworth (Vice Chairman), J. Louis Engdahl (Executive Secretary)

=== 1930 ===
January–February 1930

- Editor: J. Louis Engdahl
- National Officers: Elizabeth Gurley Flynn (chairman), Edward G. Wentworth (Vice Chairman), J. Louis Engdahl (Executive Secretary)

March–June 1930

- Editor: J. Louis Engdahl
- Associate Editor: Sol Auerbach
- National Officers: J. Louis Engdahl (General Secretary), George Maurer (Assistant Secretary), A. Jakira (Organizational Secretary)

July–December 1930

- Editor: J. Louis Engdahl
- Associate Editor: Sol Auerbach
- National Officers: J. Louis Engdahl (General Secretary), Sam Darcy (Assistant Secretary), A. Jakira (Organizational Secretary)

=== 1931 ===
- Managing Editor: Sender Garlin
- Editors: William L. Patterson, Sasha Small
- Associate Editor: Sol Auerbach

=== 1932 ===
January–September 1932

- Editors: J. Louis Engdahl, Sender Garlin, Joseph North

October–December 1932

- Editors: J. Louis Engdahl, Joseph North
- Associate Editors: Louis Colman, Sasha Small

=== 1933 ===
- Editors: William L. Patterson, Joseph North
- Associate Editors: Louis Colman, Sasha Small

=== 1934 ===
January 1934

- Managing Editor: Sender Garlin
- Editors: William L. Patterson, Sasha Small

February–December 1934

- Managing Editor: Sender Garlin
- Editors: William L. Patterson, Sasha Small
- Associate Editor: Louis Colman

=== 1935 ===
January–June 1935

- Managing Editor: Nichola Wirth
- Editors: William L. Patterson, Sasha Small
- Associate Editor: Louis Colman
- Art Editor: Limbach

July–December 1935

- Editors: William L. Patterson, Sasha Small
- Associate Editor: Louis Colman

=== 1936 ===
January–March 1936

- Editors: William L. Patterson, Sasha Small
- Associate Editor: Louis Colman

April–May 1936

- Editor: Sasha Small
- Pacific Coast Editor: Chester A. Arthur Jr.
- Editorial Board: Nathan Asch, Louis Colman, Anna Damon, Joseph Freeman, Jerre Mangione, Robert Minor, Maurice Rosenfield, Walter Wilson
- Contributing Editors: Jack Conroy, Langston Hughes, John Howard Lawson, Waldo Frank

June–December 1936

- Editor: Sasha Small
- Pacific Coast Editor: Chester A. Arthur Jr.
- Editorial Board: Nathan Asch, Louis Colman, Anna Damon, Joseph Freeman, Jerre Mangione, Robert Minor, Maurice Rosenfield, Walter Wilson
- Contributing Editors: Jack Conroy, Langston Hughes, John Howard Lawson, Waldo Frank

=== 1937 ===
January–September 1937

- Editor: Sasha Small
- Pacific Coast Editor: Chester A. Arthur Jr.
- Editorial Board: Nathan Asch, Louis Colman, Anna Damon, Joseph Freeman, Jerre Mangione, Robert Minor, Maurice Rosenfield, Walter Wilson
- Contributing Editors: Jack Conroy, Langston Hughes, John Howard Lawson, Waldo Frank

October–December 1937

- Editor: Sasha Small
- Pacific Coast Editor: Chester A. Arthur
- Editorial Board: Nathan Asch, Louis Colman, Anna Damon, Joseph Freeman, Jerre Mangione, Robert Minor, Maurice Rosenfield, Walter Wilson
- Contributing Editors: Jack Conroy, Langston Hughes, John Howard Lawson, Waldo Frank

== Pamphlet series ==
The magazine also published occasional pamphlets:

- Under Arrest! Worker's Self-Defense in the Courts (1928)
- Smash the Frame up Against the Anthracite Miners—Free Boniat, Mendola and Moleski by B. F. Gebert (1928)
- Sedition to Protest and Organize Against War Hunger Unemployment by J. L. Engdahl (1930)
- The Story of the Imperial Valley by Frank Spector (introduction by John Dos Passos) (1931)
- Tampa's Reign of Terror by Anita Brenner and S. S. Windthrop (1933)
- Night Riders in Gallup by Louis Colman (1935)
- You Cannot Kill the Working-Class by Angelo Herndon (1936)

== See also ==
- New Masses magazine
- Daily Worker newspaper
- The Masses
- The Liberator
- International Labor Defense
- International Red Aid
- Workers Party of America
- Comintern

== External sources ==
- "Labor Defender: Journal of the International Labor Defense". International Labor Defense.
- WorldCat
