= Harry Freeman (journalist) =

- Born: 1906
- Died: January 7, 1978 (aged 71–72)
- Citizenship: American
- Education: Cornell University
- Occupations: Editor, journalist, author
- Years active: 1926-1976
- Employer: TASS
- Predecessor: Kenneth Durant
- Spouse: Vera Schaap
- Relatives: Joseph Freeman
- Awards: Soviet Order of Friendship

Harry Freeman (1906 – January 7, 1978) was a 20th-Century American journalist, best known for serving in the New York bureau of TASS. The magazine editor Joseph Freeman was his brother.

== Background ==
Freeman's family came from Piratin near Lviv, part of the Poltava district in Ukraine, then part of the Russian Empire. His parents, Stella and Isaac Freeman, were Jewish and lived in the Pale of Settlement as per anti-semitic laws of the Tsarist regime. His parents worked as shopkeepers.

Freeman graduated from Cornell University with a degree in history.

== Career ==
In his 1952 memoir, Whittaker Chambers called Freeman "the best mind that I was to meet among the American Communist intellectuals." Freeman brought Chambers to work at the Daily Worker newspaper: both had recently joined the Communist Party (then using the name the Workers Party of America), Freeman was "writing foreign news." Chambers met his wife when he was covering the 1926 Passaic Strike with Freeman. Freeman and Chambers signed a petition with colleagues (including Sender Garlin, Vern Smith, and John Loomis Sherman) that asked the Central Committee of the Communist Party to have Louis Engdahl removed as editor. Later, Freeman took over the copy desk, while Chambers succeeded him on foreign news (later in turn succeeded by James S. Allen). In 1929, he succeeded his brother at TASS and lived with his wife Vera Schaap (wife of Al Schaap, a Young Communist League founder) and his brother Joseph in an apartment on Henry Street in Brooklyn Heights, rented from Eugene Lyons (formerly with TASS, by then with United Press correspondent in Moscow). Chambers recalled Freeman's guests included Sender Garlin, Abe Magill, James S. Allen, Joseph North (of the Daily Worker and New Masses), Anna Rochester, Grace Hutchins, Nadya Pavlov, and Kenneth Durant. When Freeman moved to TASS, Garlin took over on the Daily Worker's copy desk.

During the 1929 factionalism in the Party, Freeman was a Lovestoneite (follower of Jay Lovestone.)

Freeman also worked at the Brooklyn Daily Eagle newspaper and the New Masses magazine (where his brother Joseph had succeeded as editor-in-chief not long after Chambers entered the Soviet Underground). He also contributed to Pravda. He was also a United Nations correspondent and from 1946 to 1948 served as vice president of the Foreign Press Association.

== McCarthyism ==
Freeman appeared before the Senate Internal Security Subcommittee on February 21, 1956, on the scope of Russian intelligence operations in America. He invoked the Fifth Amendment when declining to answer many questions. He did say that he had never spied against the U.S. and had no association with the Communist Party since August 1941. His testimony was the first of many Americans at TASS, coming in response to a claim by defector Yuri Rastvorov in 1954.

== Later years and death ==
In 1976, Freeman received the Order of Friendship award from the Soviet Union.

Freeman died at age 72 on January 7, 1978 (Saturday).

== See also ==
- Joseph Freeman, brother
- Whittaker Chambers, comrade and colleague
- Kenneth Durant, TASS mentor
- TASS, employer
- Communist Party, affiliation
- Order of Friendship, award
