= Joseph Freeman (writer) =

American writer and magazine editor (1897–1965)

- Born: October 7, 1897; Piratin, Ukraine, Russian Empire
- Died: August 8, 1965 (aged 68); New York City
- Citizenship: American
- Education: Columbia University
- Occupations: Editor, journalist, author
- Years active: 1920–1961
- Employer(s): The Liberator, New Masses, Partisan Review
- Known for: Co-founding editor of Partisan Review
- Spouses: Ione Robinson (first), Charmion von Wiegand (second)
- Parent(s): Stella Freeman, Isaac Freeman
- Relatives: Harry Freeman (journalist)

Joseph Freeman (1897–1965) was an American writer and magazine editor. He is best remembered as an editor of New Masses, a literary and artistic magazine closely associated with the Communist Party USA, and as a founding editor of the magazine Partisan Review.

== Background ==
Joseph Freeman was born October 7, 1897, in the village of Piratin, part of the Poltava Governorate in Ukraine, which was then part of the Russian Empire. Freeman's parents, Stella and Isaac Freeman, were of ethnic Jewish extraction, forced to live in the Pale of Settlement by the anti-semitic laws of the Tsarist regime. At the behest of his grandfather, Freeman spoke Yiddish as a small boy. His parents worked as shopkeepers.

In his memoirs, Freeman recalled a traumatic boyhood incident which had followed shortly after a pogrom of the Jewish population of a neighboring town:

Less than a week later a bearded peasant came into my mother's store drunk. He asked for tobacco in a voice that frightened me, and my mother handed him a package.

"I'm not going to pay you," he said. "You filthy Jews get too much money."

"Then you can't have the tobacco."

The peasant took a clasp knife from his pocket. He opened the long blade and brandished it at my mother.

"I'll kill you," he growled.

Then he walked over to me and brandished the knife over my head.

"We'll have a nice little pogrom. We'll kill all the goddam Jews in this goddam town."

I was terrified and clung to my mother's skirt. She held me tightly to her and I saw the tears run down her cheeks. The door creaked. I saw it open. Our clerk came in. He seized the drunk by the collar and threw him into the street. The man rolled head down into the sewer-ditch. A policeman came running, dragged the peasant to his feet and lugged him into a carriage ... I felt sorry for the peasant, and felt guilty because I felt sorry.

Along with hundreds of thousands of others fleeing ethnic violence in Russia, the Freemans emigrated to the United States in 1904. Joseph was naturalized as a US citizen in 1920. In the new world, the Freemans managed to achieve a middle class existence in Brooklyn, New York, with Isaac Freeman earning a living in America as a real estate dealer.

Freeman joined the Socialist Party of America in 1914, when he was 17 years old. He worked as a telegraph clerk, a waiter, and a retail clerk during his college years.

Freeman attended Columbia University in New York City, from which he graduated with a Bachelor's degree in 1919.

== Career ==
Following graduation from Columbia, Freeman went to work on the editorial staff of a book project initiated by Harper's Magazine entitled Illustrated History of the World War. He also worked on the editorial staff of Women's Wear in 1919 and 1920.

Freeman went abroad in 1920 to take a position on the staff of the Paris edition of the Chicago Tribune, later moving to London to work for the paper from that location.

In 1922, Freeman returned to New York City, where he soon landed a staff position on Garment News, the New York-based publication of the Amalgamated Clothing Workers Union. He became an editorial staff member of the left-wing artistic magazine The Liberator in 1922, and was promoted to Associate Editor of the publication in 1923.

In the early 1920s, Freeman joined the Workers Party of America, forerunner of the Communist Party USA. He was subsequently active in various mass organizations of the party, including the American Committee for Protection of Foreign Born and the All-America Anti-Imperialist League.

In 1924, Freeman became the publicity director of the American Civil Liberties Union (ACLU). In 1926, he was a co-founder and a founding editor of New Masses magazine. From 1926 to 1927, he was the magazine's correspondent in Moscow. In 1929, he was the magazine's editor in Mexico.

Freeman's brother, Harry Freeman, introduced Whittaker Chambers to the Daily Worker newspaper. Chambers socialized with the Freeman brothers and their circle, which Chambers said included representatives of TASS. Freeman worked for TASS in the late 1920s, followed by his brother Harry in 1929. From 1931 to 1933, Joseph became editor again at New Masses, during the period when Chambers joined the Soviet Underground (1932). The Freeman's social circle included Harry's wife Vera Schaap (wife of Al Schaap, a Young Communist League founder), Sender Garlin, Abe Magill, James S. Allen, Joseph North (of The Daily Worker and New Masses), Anna Rochester, Grace Hutchins, Nadya Pavlov, and Kenneth Durant.

Freeman was a founding editor of Partisan Review in 1934, a publication which touted itself as "A Bi-Monthly of Revolutionary Literature Published by the John Reed Club of New York." The magazine was launched with the understanding that it would concentrate primarily on literary and cultural themes, thereby leaving New Masses to pursue a heavier portion of political themes.

In 1936–1937, Freeman served again as editor of New Masses.

In 1939, he left the Communist Party. About that time, he worked as a freelance writer for publications including The Nation, Fortune, and Life,

In 1940, Freeman returned to the ACLU for a second stint as its publicity director, working in that capacity until 1942. He then moved into radio, working on the editorial staff of a news program called Information Please.

From 1948 until 1961, Freeman worked in the private sector in the field of public relations, employed by the firms of Edward L. Bernays (1948–1952) and Executive Research, Inc. (1952–1961).

== Personal life and death ==
In 1929, while working for TASS in Mexico, Freeman met and married Ione Robinson, an American painter who modeled for and studied under Diego Rivera. They divorced in 1931.

Freeman married American journalist, abstract painter, and art critic, Charmion von Wiegand, in 1932 or 1934, in New York.

Joseph Freeman died on August 8, 1965. He was 67 years old.

== Legacy ==
Some of Freeman's papers, consisting of 4 linear feet of material, are housed in the Rare Book and Manuscript Library of Columbia University in New York City. His correspondence and other of his papers (81.4 linear feet) are in the Hoover Institution Archives at Stanford University. See the Joseph Freeman Papers, 1904–1966 Master negative microfilm of New Masses, the magazine with which Freeman was most closely associated, is held by the New York Public Library.

== Works ==
In 1936, Freeman published his memoirs, An American Testament: A Narrative of Rebels and Romantics.

- Dollar Diplomacy: A Study in American Imperialism. Co-author with Scott Nearing. New York: Vanguard Press, 1925.
- Voices of October: Art and Literature in Soviet Russia. Co-editor, with Joshua Kunitz and Louis Lozowick. New York: Vanguard Press, 1930.
- The Soviet Worker: An Account of the Economic, Social and Cultural Status of Labor in the USSR. New York: International Publishers, 1932.
- The Background of German Fascism. New York: Workers Library Publishers, 1933.
- Proletarian Literature in the United States: An Anthology. Co-editor with Granville Hicks. New York: International Publishers, 1936.
- An American Testament: A Narrative of Rebels and Romantics. New York: Farrar and Rinehart, 1936.
- Never Call Retreat. New York: Farrar and Rinehart, 1943.
- The Long Pursuit. New York: Farrar and Rinehart, 1947.
