= Harry Eisman =

Soviet writer (1913–1979)

Harry Eduardovich Eisman
- Гарри Эдуардович Айзман
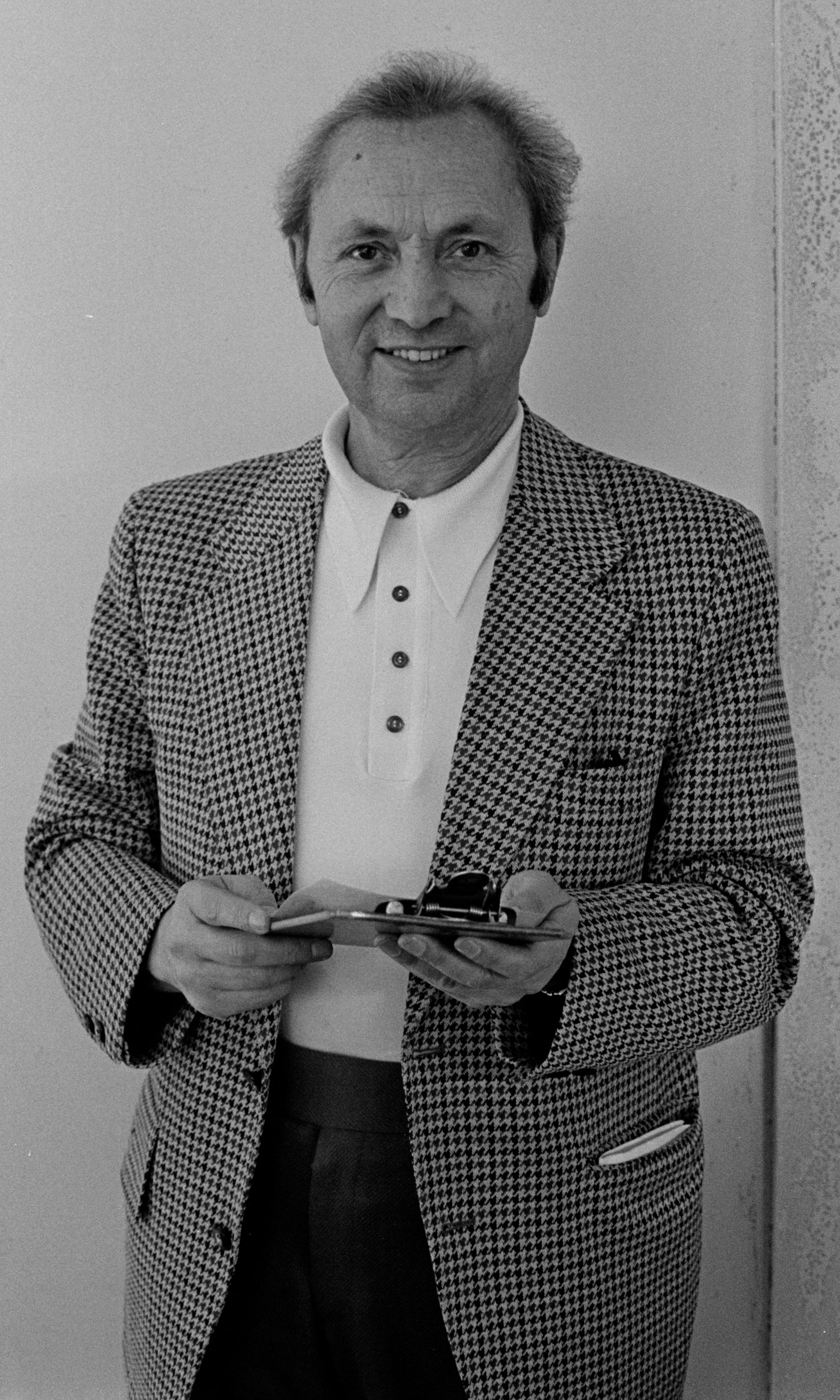
- Eisman in 1973
- Born: December 1913; Kishinev, Bessarabia Governorate, Russian Empire
- Died: May 6, 1979 (aged 65); Moscow, Soviet Union
- Citizenship: Soviet Union
- Awards: Орден Красной Звезды — 1945 Медаль «За боевые заслуги» — 1944 Медаль «За победу над Германией в Великой Отечественной войне 1941—1945 гг.»

Harry Eduardovich Eisman (December 1913 – May 6, 1979) was an American and Soviet activist, journalist and war hero. He first rose to prominence as a young Communist in the Bronx during the late 1920s; after two spells in New York reformatories, he fled to the Soviet Union in 1930, where he finished his education worked as a journalist. He later joined the Red Army and fought on the Eastern Front, including at the Battle of Stalingrad.

== Early life and time in New York ==
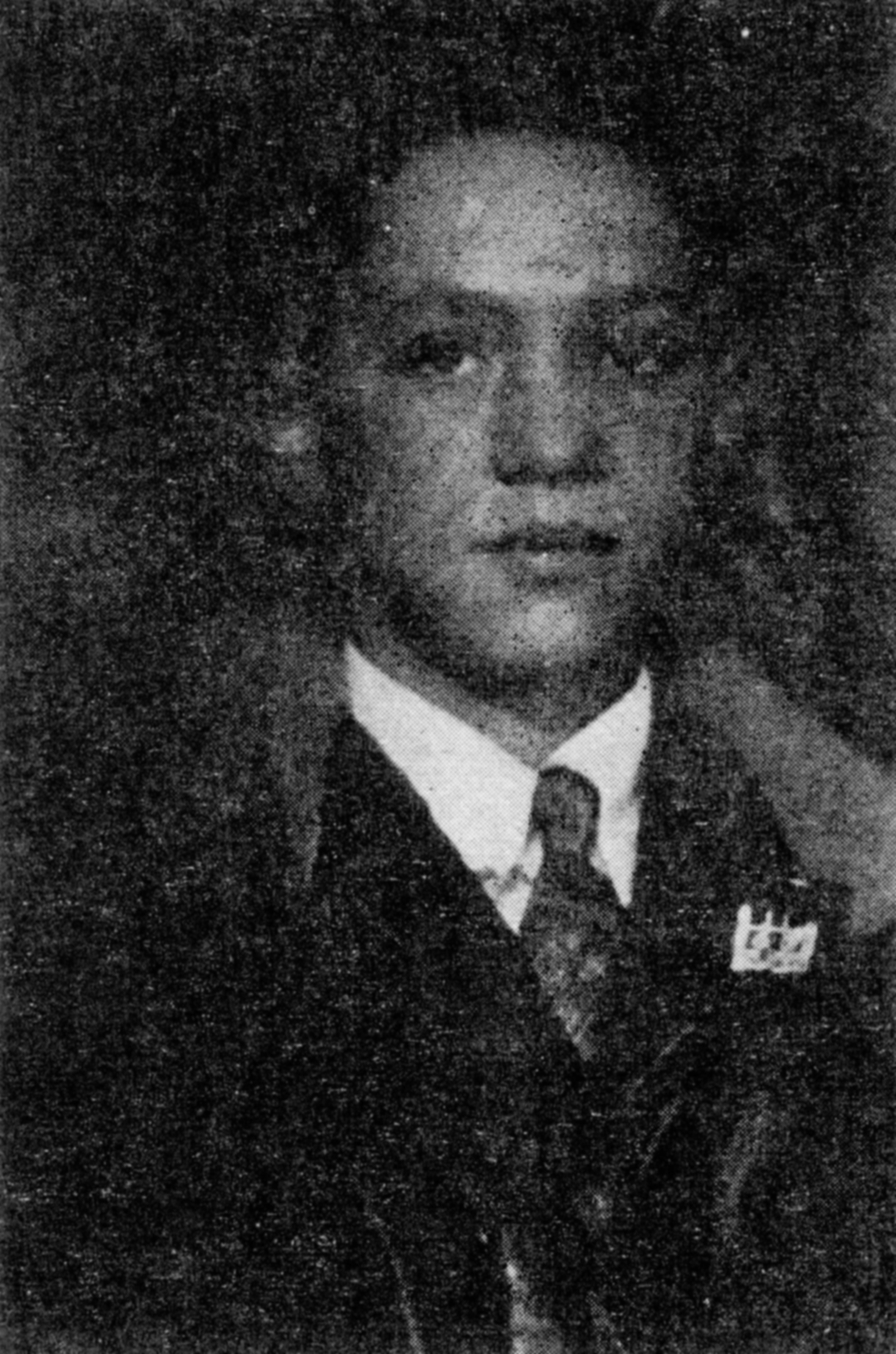
Eisman c. 1928

Eisman was born into a Jewish family in Chișinău, Moldova (then Kishinev, in the Bessarabia Governorate of the Russian Empire) in December 1913. After being orphaned at the age of seven, Eisman emigrated to New York City to live with his oldest brother Alexander and their three sisters when he was nine.

Eisman rose to prominence as an adolescent in New York after becoming involved in the activities of the children's organization of the Communist Party, the Young Pioneers of America (YPA). Eisman and his sister Eda first joined a YPA group in Brownsville, Brooklyn and later joined a troop in the Bronx. He was expelled from his school, PS 61, for leading a group of children who named themselves "The Lenin Unit" and distributed Communist pamphlets among New York schoolchildren. The Congressional Inquiry led by New York Congressman Hamilton Fish III identified Eisman as the leader of an "agitation" that had reached an estimated 3,500 youths with Communist propaganda.

Eisman grew in prominence, and began writing articles for the Communist children's pamphlet Young Comrade and the adult Communist newspaper, the Daily Worker. He gave speeches at various local Communist events in New York City. In July 1928 he spoke at an event to launch Rebecca Grecht's Workers' Party campaign for New York's third State Assembly District.

Eisman was a vocal critic of Racial segregation in the United States. In April 1929 after thirteen-year-old African American Henry Clarke was murdered in New York after winning a race at a school athletic meeting, Eisman attended and organized protests in Harlem and the Bronx.

=== Arrests and imprisonments ===
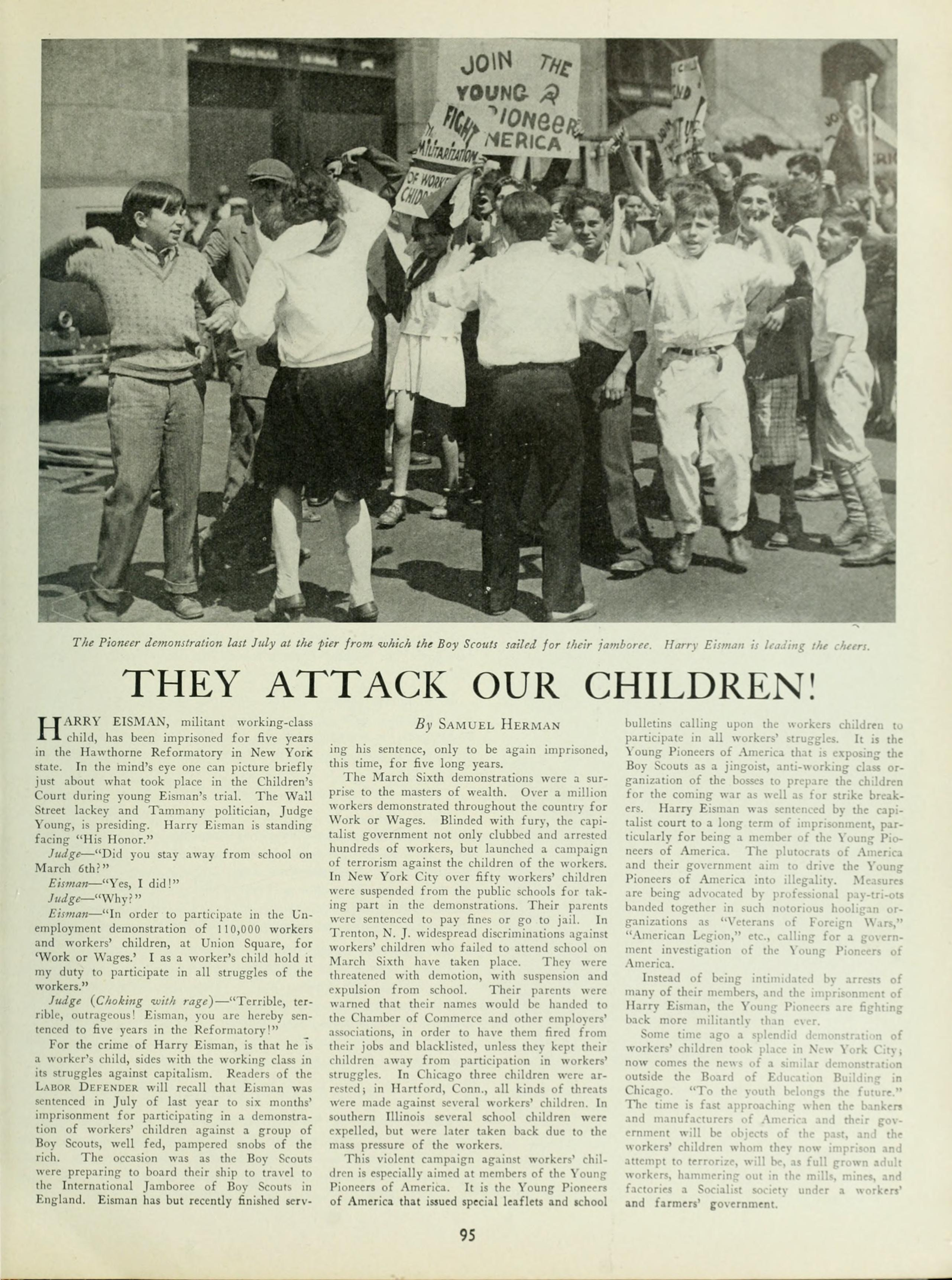
A profile of Eisman and the Young Pioneers of America by Samuel Herman for Labor Defender, May 1930

In July 1929, Eisman was arrested at a YPA demonstration against the Boy Scouts. Pioneers including Eisman delayed the departure of Cunard Line's RMS Samaria (1920) by blockading the quayside in order to inconvenience Scouts travelling to an international jamboree in Birkenhead, England. Following what historian Mischa Honeck describes as a “fully-fledged brawl,” the police managed to restore order. According to the New York Times, Eisman's resultant appearance at the Children's Court in Manhattan was his fifth in the space of twelve months. He had previously been arrested at a dressmakers' strike and on successive May Day demonstrations in 1928 and 1929. He was sentenced to a six month custodial sentence at Hawthorne reformatory school. During Eisman's spell in the reformatory, he was elected honorary president of the first meeting of the international Children's Congress in Moscow.

Eisman was released in January 1930 but was arrested again soon after taking part in the large March 6 unemployment demonstration alongside adult Communist leaders William Z. Foster, Israel Amter, and Robert Minor. This time he was sentenced to almost six years in custody, and was not scheduled to be released until his twenty-first birthday. The YPA protested against Eisman's incarceration in several American cities including New York and Chicago. Eisman's birth in Chișinău meant that he could claim Soviet citizenship. In November 1930, American authorities permitted Eisman to go to the Soviet Union on the condition that he did not return to the United States for a minimum of two years. American journalists criticised the fact that this appeared to be a coup for American Communists. The Hartford Courant suggested that the YPA were being allowed to send their "prize bad boy" to Moscow for a "post-graduate" course in "Revolution." Eisman himself told the Brooklyn Daily Eagle that his life goal was to "overthrow the capitalist yoke." When asked the Revolution he hoped to see should be violent he responded, "Well, dead men tell no tales."

== Eisman in the Soviet Union ==
=== Reception in the Soviet Union ===
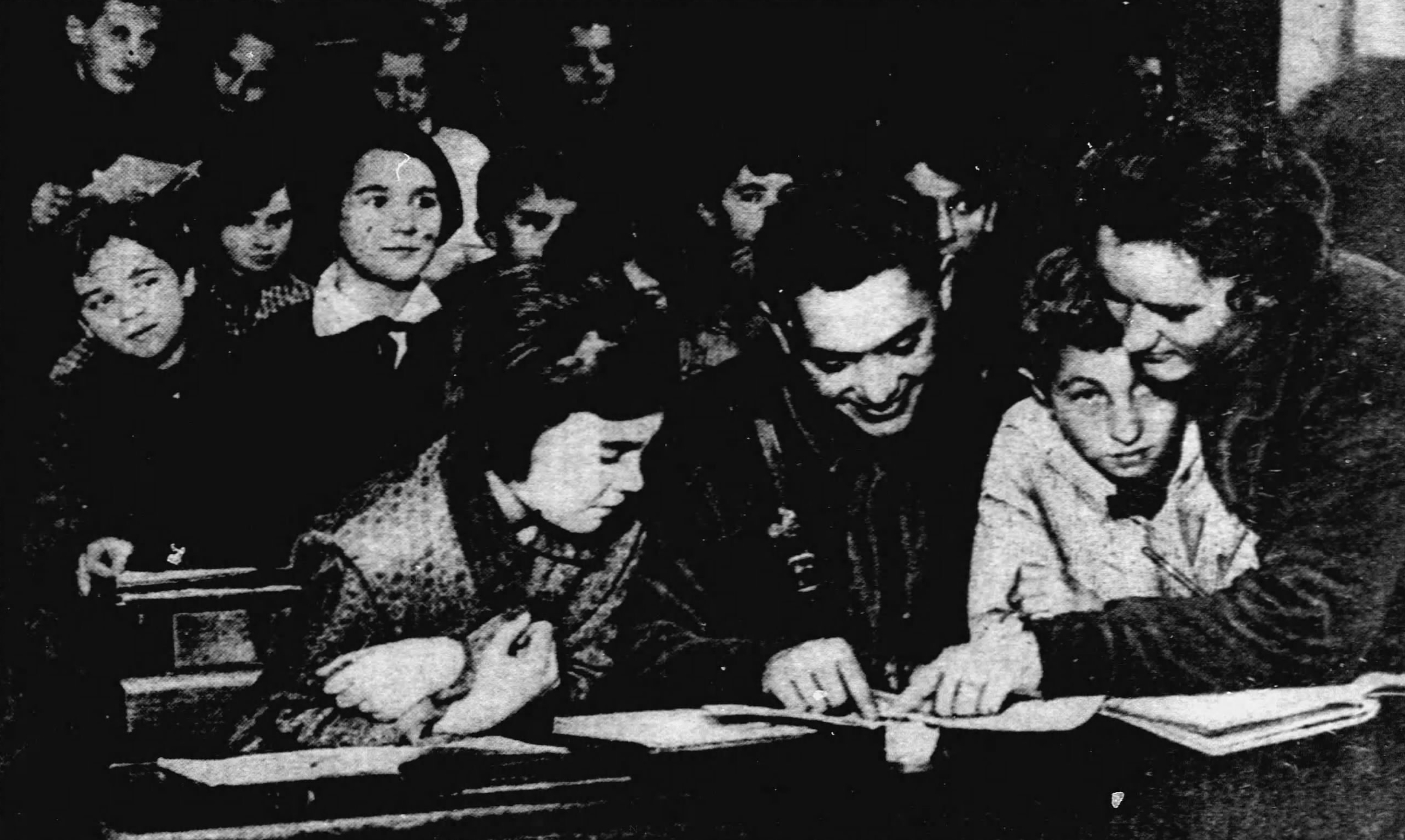
Eisman (center) with a group of schoolchildren in Moscow c. 1931

He received a warm reception and participated in multiple events for Young Pioneers and the Komsomol. Securing his release from an American reformatory was a symbolic victory for the Pioneer movement. He published an account of his early travels in the Soviet Union under the title "An American Boy in the Soviet Union." After what was essentially a nine-month victory tour he attended a trade school in Moscow. Following his education, Eisman became a journalist, worked as a Communist International employee and in the Anti-Fascist Committee. In 1932, Eisman provided one of the eulogies at the funeral of J. Louis Engdahl in Moscow. He was billed as the "deported militant leader of the working youth of New York" and his fellow eulogists included Sen Katayama, André Marty, and the future president of East Germany Wilhelm Pieck.

=== World War Two and later life ===
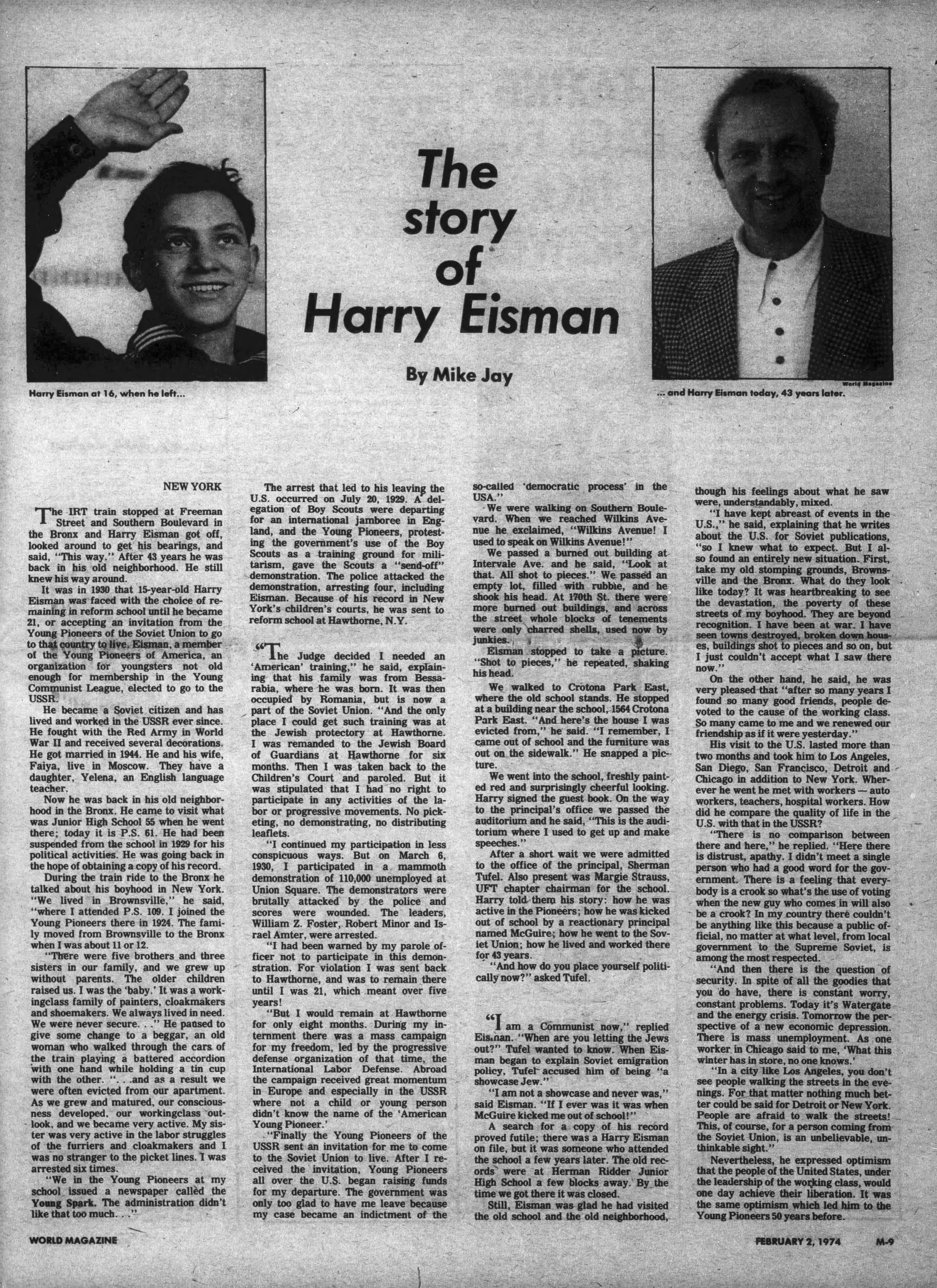
"The story of Harry Eisman," a profile of Eisman by Mike Jay for the Daily World, published February 2, 1974

Eisman joined the Red Army in 1942. As a platoon commander he saw action at the Battle of Voronezh (1942) and the Battle of Stalingrad. Later in the war, Eisman worked away from the front lines as a translator and war correspondent. As a result of his military service he was awarded the Medal "For Battle Merit" in 1943 and the Order of the Red Star in 1945.

Mary M. Leder notes in her book My Life in Stalinist Russia: An American Woman Looks Back that Eisman was deported to Siberia in the 1950s for maintaining contacts with the writer Anna Louise Strong who fell out of favour with the Soviet authorities.

After the death of Joseph Stalin, Eisman returned to Moscow and worked in the Soviet-American Friendship Society, visited Young Pioneer camps with lectures about his experience of living in the United States. He published his second book "Red Ties in the Dollar Country" in 1972 (Moscow, Molodaya Gvardiya Publishers). In 1974 Eisman visited New York City where he met his relatives, visited his old school and other places of his childhood. He died on May 6, 1979, in Moscow and was buried at the Donskoye Cemetery.

== Awards ==
- Order of the Red Star (May 18, 1945)
- Medal "For Battle Merit" (June 23, 1944)

== Works ==
- An American Boy in the Soviet Union. New York: Youth Publishers, 1934.

== See also ==
- Hubert Loste
- Joseph Beyrle
