= Young Pioneers of America =

Communist children's organization

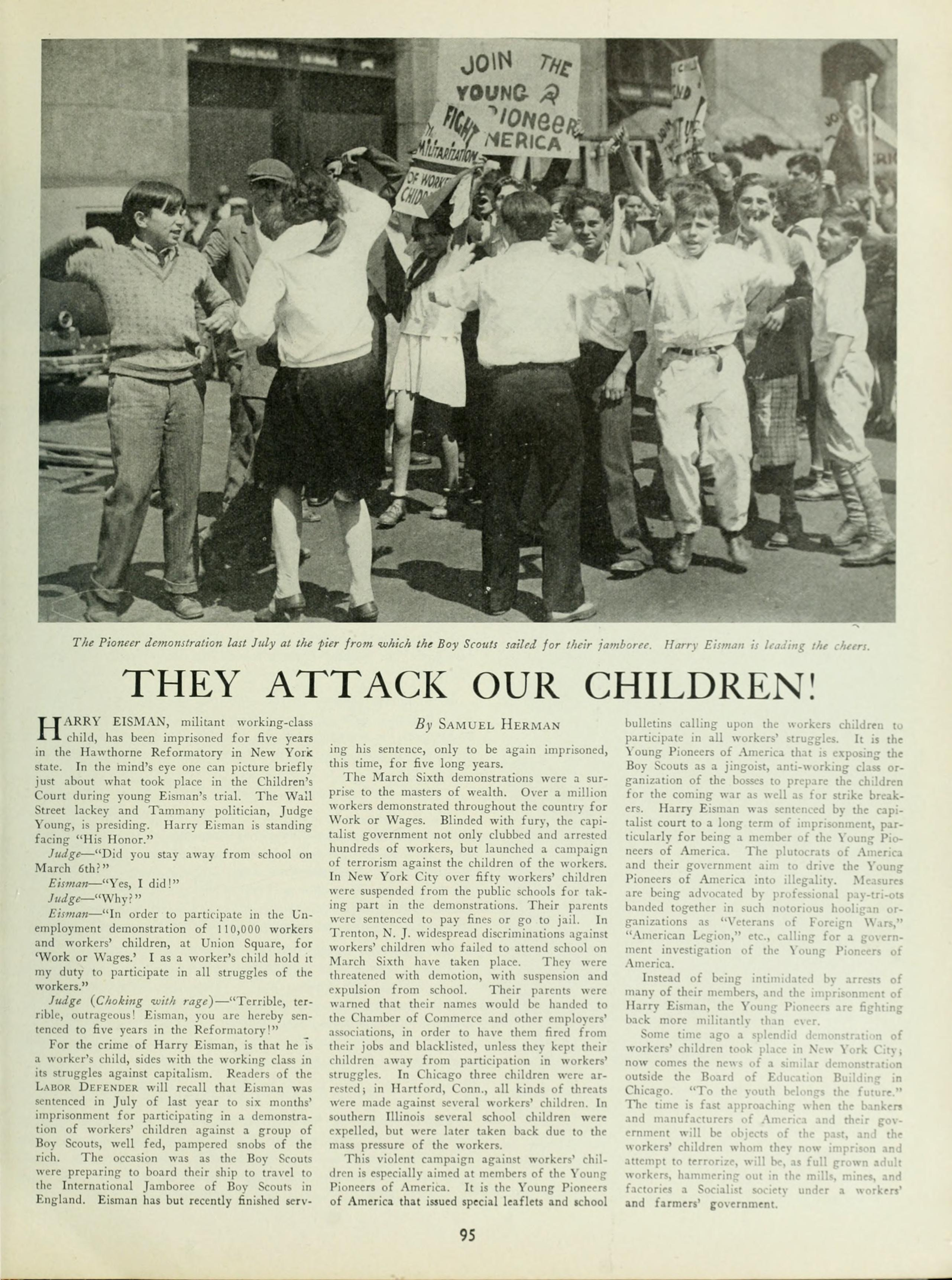
A profile of Harry Eisman and the Pioneers by Samuel Herman for Labor Defender, May 1930

The Young Pioneers of America or Young Pioneers League of America was a children's organization affiliated with the Communist Party USA, under its various names, from 1922 to 1934. It began as the Junior Section of the Young Workers League of America, and was reorganized as the YPA in 1925, when the YWL became the Young Workers (Communist) League. The organization was disbanded in 1934, with its activities taken over by the Junior Section of the International Workers Order, a CPUSA mass organization.

== Organization ==
According to the Fish committee reports, the YPA was open to youth from 8–15 years of age, after which they were expected to graduate into the Young Communist League proper. Selected YCL members were assigned to facilitate YPA activities, though ideally the children's branches were self-governing. The basic unit of organization was the local branch based centered on a neighborhood or school. Ultimately, the Party wished that all the branches would be organized around schools, in the same manner as they hoped to reorganize the party around "industrial cells" at the workplace. Higher units were organized at the city and state levels, supervised by a National Pioneer Buro. Every tier of leadership included a representative of the YCL, as well as children.

YPA troops would meet in local workers centers, labor lyceums and halls owned by Communist affiliated groups. Each local branch was sponsored by an adult organization such as the United Workers Cooperative, the Slovak Workers Society, and the Finnish or Jewish Workers Club. Despite the majority of the membership being of recent immigrant background, the YPA tried to distance itself from ethnic identification and tried to emphasize its status an organization of the generic "American proletariat". The ethnic identities of its members were rarely mentioned in its publications (with the exceptions of African American, Cuban or American Indian members) and some branch meetings were conducted in English, despite all the members being native Yiddish speakers. Nevertheless, the YPA had a strong ethnic base, largely among Eastern European Jewish Americans and Finnish Americans and in New York were most active in the Jewish neighborhoods of the Bronx and Brooklyn.

New York-based Pioneer Harry Eisman rose to prominence due to his activity in and around his school in the Bronx. He was ultimately sent to a reformatory school. After the New York YPA organized protests and demonstrations and several Pioneers had attended an international Communist youth meeting in Moscow, Eisman was permitted to travel to the Soviet Union rather than serve his sentence. Eventually he fought at the Battle of Stalingrad and was awarded the Soviet honour, the Order of the Red Star.

== Camps ==
Perhaps the most successful project of the Young Pioneers were their summer camps. These were co-sponsored by the Workers International Relief as well as other sympathetic ethnic, fraternal and labor organizations. There were 2 of these camps in 1925, but 20 by 1930 in eight states, with five in New York alone. Camps are known to have been set up in California, New Jersey, Pennsylvania, Massachusetts, Michigan, Minnesota and Wisconsin.

== Notable members ==
- Murray Bookchin
- Chandler Davis
- Solon De Leon (adult functionary)
- Harry Eisman
- Murry Weiss
- Ruth Young

== Publications ==
- Hodgson, Jack “Young Reds in the Big Apple”,2025
- Potamkin, Harry Alan. Rady, Gertrude. Morrow, D. Marya Pioneer song book, songs for workers' and farmers' children New York : New Pioneer, 1933
- Kay, Helen. We demand: a story of any boy and any girl New York City: National Committee Unemployed Councils, Young Pioneers of America, 1933 (Pamphlet no. 1 issued for the Campaign against Child Misery, Hunger and Labor.)
- Campion, Martha; Mary Morrow illustr. Who Are the Young Pioneers? New York: New Pioneer Pub. Co., 1934 Available in different formats online.

=== Periodicals ===
- Young Comrade Chicago, Junior Section of the Young Workers League of America (later Young Pioneers of America) Vol. 1 #1 Nov. 1923 - Vol. 5 #6 Nov. 1928
- Young Pioneer New York, Young Pioneers of America Vol. 6 #1 Feb. 1929 - Vol. 8 #1 Jan. 1931
- Pioneer New York: Pioneer, Vol. 1 #1 May 1931
- New Pioneer New York: Pioneer Pub. Co., Vol. 1 #2 June 1931 Vol. 10 #10 Feb. 1939
