= Ione Robinson =

American artist & writer (1910–1989)

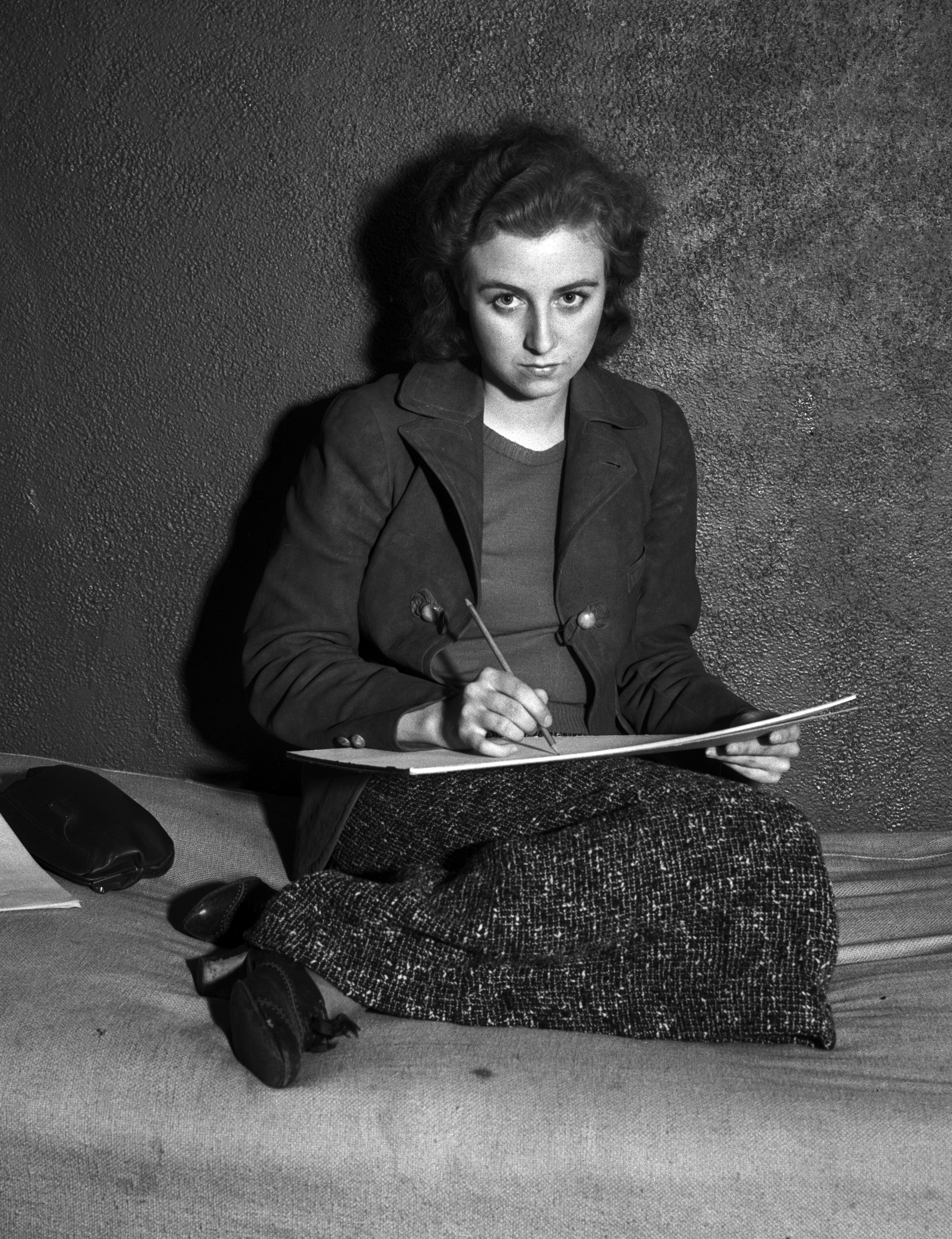
- Ione Robinson, 1929
- Born: 1910; Portland, Oregon
- Died: 1989 (aged 78–79); Paris, France

Ione Robinson (Oct 3, 1910 – Nov 1989) was an American artist, writer and socialite. She is most known for her reporting of the Mexican muralist movement, especially episodes on Diego Rivera and David Alfaro Siqueiros, in her book A Wall to Paint on (1946). In this book, she reported also her experiences from the Spanish Civil War, that she witnessed in Barcelona in 1938.

== Life and work ==
=== Education ===
Robinson was educated at Otis Art Institute, Los Angeles, from 1925 to 1926. In 1927 she participated in a Pennsylvania Academy Summer School programme. During a first visit in New York in August 1927, she decided to stay there and took a job as a private teacher in Woodstock, NY. She started to work for Frankl Galleries, a seller of design furniture, shortly after this. Later, she assisted to Rockwell Kent in producing woodcuts. She characterized Kent's work in this time with the following words: «I don't like Rockwell's cold, hard lines and forms in his paintings; nevertheless, this same technique in his black and white drawings has power.» She was introduced to Elena Krylenko and Max Eastman, friends of Leon Trotsky. From this moment to the time she settled permanently in France in the 1940s, she succeeded in widening her sphere in affluent circles of New York and New England.

=== The muralist scene 1929–1932 ===
In 1928, Robinson visited Paris for the first time, then Florence and Naples in 1929. Back in Croton at the Eastmans, she met George Biddle, who offered to introduce her to Diego Rivera for a work placement. In 1929 too, she had a first opportunity to exhibit drawings in the Weyhe Gallery in New York City. Soon after this, she traveled to Mexico City, where she was welcomed by the son and daughter of José Vasconcelos Calderón, a former mexican education minister, who had initiated, among others, the muralist movement in 1921 by releasing statal commissions especially in school buildings. With her letter of recommendation by Biddle, Robinson finally met Rivera, who invited her to participate working in his Epopeya mural. The work included scaling sketches and tracing them to the wall, then tracing the drawings onto sections of paper for later transfer onto the fresh plaster. She also participated in restoring damaged riverian frescoes in the SEP. The work was done by Robinson and Ramón Alva Guadarrama, with additional helpers. The same year Robinson posed to Rivera for the allegory of Continence for his Health ministry frescoes. During her stay she was housed by the photographer Tina Modotti. Her acquaintances in a very short time came to include many members of the muralist and literati scene, but also Sergei Eisenstein and finally the journalist Joe Freeman, the TASS representative in Mexico at the time, whom she married in the end of 1929. They divorced in 1931 due to differences of the mindsets of the two, Freeman being a stalwart communist with Jewish orthodox background, Robinson, on the other hand, a fellow-traveller of liberal middle-class provenance.

Back in New York in 1930, Robinson came in contact with José Clemente Orozco, who may have connected her with Alma Reed, the owner of Delphic Studios, where she had the opportunity to show some of her Mexican drawings. Orozco also drove Robinson's attention to Spain, at the time when the monarchy was about to fall.

A John Simon Guggenheim fellowship enabled Robinson to spend another ten months in Mexico, from spring 1931 to early 1932. For a short time, she assisted Victor Arnautoff in executing parts of Riveras's National palace mural, while Rivera himself worked in California. This caused great ill-feelings, for Rivera seemed to blame Robinson for his expulsion from the Mexican Communist Party in 1929, in which Joe Freeman was apparently involved. Frida Kahlo, Rivera's wife since 1929, got notice of her working on the National palace project, and Robinson had to leave it. During her sojourn, she met Jean Charlot, one of the early pioneers of muralism in Mexico, who later reported his experiences in his book The Mexican Mural Renaissance, 1920–1925. Another acquaintance was the artist from Utah, Paul Higgins (or Pablo O'Higgins, who often claimed to be born in San Francisco), who played an important role in mediating between US-American newcomers and the muralists in Mexico, especially Rivera, in the 1930s. In «the village Tlalpam», Robinson taught in an Open Air School, together with the Japanese painter Kitagawa. Robinson deepened her knowledge mainly of mexican colonial art travelling to various places and studying the collection of the Academia de San Carlos.

=== WPA, New York, Barcelona 1931–1938 ===
Another unhappy marriage with John Dallet, a descendant from a rich southern plantation owner family, in 1933, allowed Robinson to lead a relatively carefree life for the following years. In that same year, she lost her mother and a brother in a car accident. Her daughter Anne Dallet, born in 1935, whom she had to leave in the custody of the Dallet family after her separation from her husband, triggered her to writing down her experiences of 1927 to 1939, published in 1946.

In 1936 Robinson was included in a non-relief project of the WPA in the Bellevue Hospital in New York, as an assistant of several younger painters including Emilio Luis Amero Mimiaga, Antonio Pujol Jiménez and Luis Arenal Bastar. From this, an own mural project resulted: the representation of peasants sowing and harvesting. A second project was offered to her in the prison at Welfare Island, which she refused. The project in the hospital was finally dismissed. In 1938, she tried to arrange a mural project for Luis Quintanilla at Columbia University.

Again in France, Robinson decided to visit Barcelona and witness the situation of the Spanish Republic. Passing through London, she had the opportunity to talk to Winston Churchill who recommended to her that instead of being bombed in Barcelona she should wait in London and be bombed there. She should "take the first boat home and urge the people of my country not to be spectators of events that were happening in Europe". Nevertheless Robinson traveled to Barcelona where she could visit "refugios" (children's homes) and keep records of their inhabitants. By intermediation of Luis Quintanilla she met members of the government and commanders of the Republican Army, including general Bibiano Fernández Osorio y Tafall who became a close friend of Robinson and led her to the Ebro front where normally no "tourists" were allowed. In Spain she met David Alfaro Siqueiros who, like Antonio Pujol, was a stalwart communist, had joined the Republican Army and had been appointed a colonel, considering his experience as a soldier in the Mexican Revolution in the 1910s. Siqueiros, whom she first met in Mexico in 1929, had been a regular passerby of hers in New York in 1936.

Before returning to the American continent Robinson accepted an invitation of Alfred and Dorothy Oeschner, American journalists living in Berlin. She left a rare description of the Goering barracks in Wedding, and of a talk to the director of the structure about the ways in which German promoted murals in comparison to the WPA. Robinson displayed her Spanish works several times in the United States and in Mexico, with the primary aim to gain backing for the Republic.

=== France ===
From the 1940s, Robinson spent much time in France and worked as an illustrator for magazines like Vogue. From a further marriage or liaison she had a son Michael Robinson. Her daughter Anne Ione Brady (Dallet) had a son named C.J. Dallet (died 2017).

== Artistic works ==
Sources:

- The family, 1931, painting.
- La jeune fille, 1932, painting.
- Antoine no.1, 1937, painting.
- Watching Enemy Planes, Barcelona, [1938], pencil on paper.
- After Bombardment, [1938], pencil on paper.
- [Mother and Baby] In a refugio, Barcelona, [1938], pencil on paper.
- [Mother and Child] In a refugio, Barcelona, [1938], pencil on paper.
- [Two Children] In a refugio, Barcelona, [1938], pencil on paper.
- Boy and Girl, Barcelona, [1938], pencil on paper.
- Genocide orphan, 1938.
- Child with Bread, 1938, painting.
- Girl with Grass, 1938, painting.
- Young Republican [Boy], 1938, painting.
- Young Republican [Girl], 1938, painting.
- Little Girl in the refugio at Barcelona, 1938, photograph.
- Republican Boy, Barcelona, 1938, photograph.
- [Man in the] Concentration Camp, Argelés, [1939], pencil on paper.
- [Man and Boy in the] Concentration Camp, Argelés, [1939], pencil on paper.
- Republican Boy with French Soldier in concentration camp, Argelés, [1939], photograph.
- Republican Children [Boy and Girl] aboard refugee ship of S.E.R.E. (Spanish Refugee Evacuation Service), [1939], photograph.
- Boy from Madrid, Escuela Mexico-España Morelia, Mexico, [1939], photograph.
- Spanish Children, Escuela Mexico-España Morelia, Mexico, [1939], photograph.
- Little Girl on bed in dormitory (with Republican bed spreads), Escuela, [1939], photograph.
- Orphan Girl, Escuela, [1939], photograph.
- Firenze, 1944, pencil on paper.
- London Boy, "Bombardment", 1945, pencil on paper.

== Exhibitions and awards ==
- LACMA, Los Angeles, 1929
- Marie Harriman Gallery, New York, 1931
- Delphic Studios, New York, 1931
- Guggenheim Fellowship, 1931
- Julian Levy Gallery, New York, 1938
- University of Mexico, Mexico City, 1938
- PAFA annual students exhibitions, 1939, 1941
- Bonestell Gallery, [Los Angeles], 1940
- Bellas Artes, Mexico, D.F., 1944

== Publications by Ione Robinson ==
- André Siegfried, translated by Doris Hemming, H. H. Hemming, Illustrations by Ione Robinson, Impressions of South America, New York Harcourt 1933.
- A Wall to Paint on, New York, E.P. Dutton and Co., 1946.
- Stunden mit Wols, Wien 1947.
- Talking to Giacommetti, Vogue, Nov. 1, 1948.
- Wols à bâtons rompus, Oeil 1959.

== Publications on Ione Robinson ==
- Teresa del Conde, Pintora sin muros ni barreras, La Jornada, March 17th, 1998.
- Jonathan Skinner, Christopher J. B. Dallett, La retirada : the Spanish republican diaspora, 1938–1939 : the paintings, drawings, and photographs of Ione Robinson, New York 2002
- La diáspora española recordada en fotos, El Litoral [Santa Fé, Argentina], Nov. 17th, 2002
- Andrew Hemingway, Artists on the Left. American Artists and the Communist Movement 1926–1956, Yale University Press, New Haven and London 2002, p. 27.
- Ione Robinson : arte pola liberdade: fotografías e debuxos 1938-1939: Casa da Parra, Santiago de Compostela : Xunta de Galicia, [2007].
- Stephanie J. Smith, The Painter and the Communist: Gender, Culture, and the Fleeting Marriage of Ione Robinson and Joseph Freeman, 1929–1932, Journal of Women's History, Johns Hopkins University Press, Volume 31, Number 3, Fall 2019, pp. 12–34.
- Francie Cate-Arries, Ione Robinson and the Art of Bearing Witness. Picturing Trauma in the Ruins of War, in: Nancy Berthier, Vicente Sánchez-Biosca (Ed.), Retóricas del miedo. Imágenes de la Guerra Civil Española, Madrid 2012.
- Román Gubern, Paul Hammond, Luis Buñuel, The Red Years 1929-1939, Wisconsin, University of Wisconsin Press, 2012, p. 312.

== Archives ==
- Ione Robinson, Artist file : miscellaneous uncataloged material (1 folder), Museum of Modern Art, New York.
- Ione Robinson 1910–, Manuscript, Cleveland Museum of Art.
- Ione Robinson : artist file : study photographs and reproductions of works of art with accompanying documentation 1920–2000, Frick Art Reference Library of The Frick Collection, New York.
- Ione Robinson with Carl Zigrosser, Correspondence 1058, n.d., University of Pennsylvania Libraries, Van Pelt Library, Philadelphia, PA.
