= Ruth Young (labor union official) =

American labor union official 1916-1986

- Born: Ruth Youkelson; August 30, 1916; Chicago, Illinois
- Died: February 4, 1986 (aged 69); New York, New York
- Other names: Ruth Young Jandreau
- Occupation: labor union official

Ruth Young (1916–1986) was an American labor union official. She is known for her union work in the 1940s, at a time when women were entering the workforce in significant numbers.

Young was born Ruth Youkelson on August 30, 1916 in Chicago, Illinois. Her parents were Jewish immigrants from Zhytomyr. She moved into the United Workers Cooperatives in the Bronx and, after graduating from high school, Young began earning a living as a factory worker. As a teen she was a member of the Young Pioneers of America. As a young woman she became a member of the Trade Union Unity League. Her union activism continued at the United Electrical, Radio and Machine Workers of America (UE-CIO). She became a member of the staff of the UE-CIO. In 1940 she became the Membership and Education Director of the UE District 4 and eventually served as Executive Secretary. She was the first women to serve on the executive board.

In the 1950s Young left the union, as well as the Communist Party USA.

Young was married twice; first to Irving Charles Velson, then to Leo Jandreau. She wrote an autobiographical essay in 1979 entitled My Story (Some Splinters of a Life) which is part of the Harvard Square Library.

Young died on February 4, 1986 in New York City.

== Legacy ==
Sociologist Ruth Milkman donated her collection of documents, including a copy of Young's FBI file, to the Tamiment Library and Robert F. Wagner Labor Archives of New York University.
