= Augusta Strong North =

American writer and linguist (1934–1976)

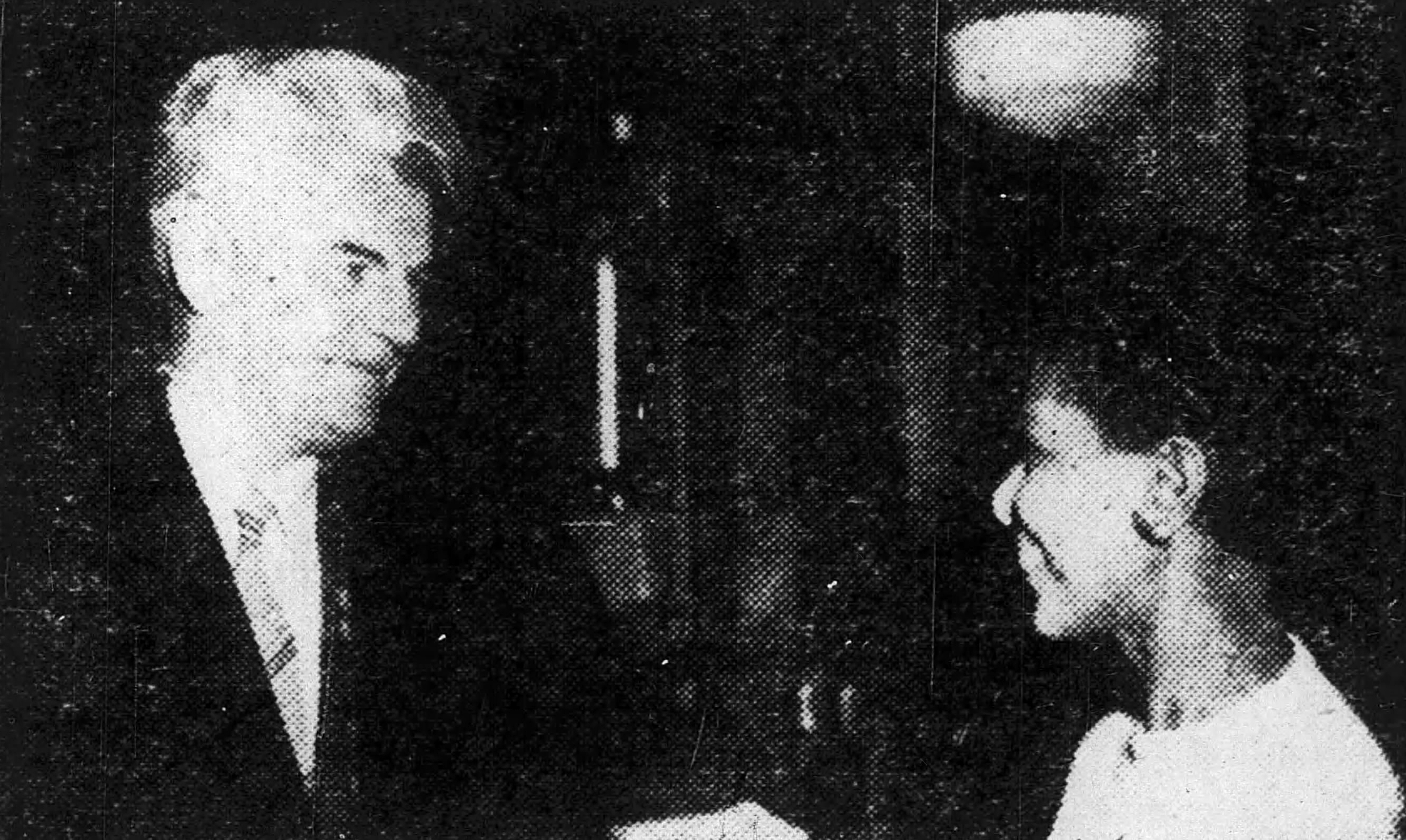
North (right) greets Eugene Dennis at the Daily Worker office following his release from prison, December 27, 1955

Augusta Strong North (1934 – September 1, 1976) was an American journalist, linguist, and educator.

North was born in 1934, in Brooklyn, and studied at Brooklyn College. A Marxist, she was a cofounder Freedomways and member of the Southern Negro Youth Congress. From 1972 to 1975, she lived in the Soviet Union, teaching at Suffern College upon her return. At the time of her death, New York University had her as a candidate for a linguistics doctorate.

North married the Communist journalist Joseph North in 1963; she had three children with him. She died from illness on September 1, 1976, at Martha's Vineyard Hospital in Oak Bluffs, Massachusetts. She was aged 41 or 42, though her obituary in The New York Times erroneously claims 61.
