= Sender Garlin =

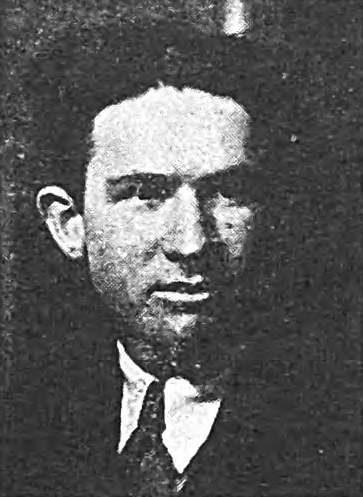
- Garlin c. 1931
- Born: April 4, 1902; Białystok, Poland
- Died: December 6, 1999 (aged 97); Boulder, Colorado, US
- Education: University of Wisconsin, New York University, New School for Social Research, Rand School of Social Science
- Employer: Daily Worker
- Organization: CPUSA
- Known for: "The Constant Reader" column
- Political party: Workers Party of America, CPUSA
- Spouse: Martha Millet Garlin
- Children: 3

Sender Garlin (April 4, 1902 – December 6, 1999) was an American journalist, pamphleteer, and writer.

== Career ==
=== Background ===
Sender Garlin was born in Białystok, Poland, on April 4, 1902. His family left the country in 1906 to escape pogroms. Among his six siblings were Tiba Willner Sam Garlen, and Charles Garlen.

In the U.S., his family lived in Burlington, Vermont, and Glens Falls, New York, where his parents ran a bakery. Garlin studied at the University of Wisconsin, New York University's Law School, Albany Law School, the New School for Social Research, and the Rand School of Social Science. One of his professors was Scott Nearing. Garlin told historian Howard Zinn:

Reading The Appeal to Reason and the writings of Upton Sinclair, Sender at thirteen or fourteen considered himself a socialist. He said: "In later years, it was Karl Marx who recreated me with his criticism of this cruel, unjust society... No one has refuted his fundamental critique."

=== New York ===
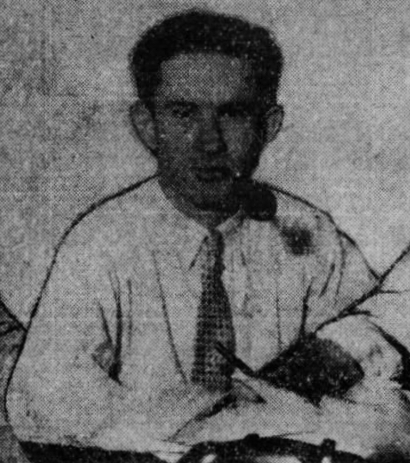
Garlin c. 1934

Garlin worked on the staff at the Daily Worker newspaper for 17 years (1927–1943) and was associate editor (1950–1952) of New World Review. He was a founding editor of Partisan Review magazine and a charter member of the American Newspaper Guild. He was also a member of the John Reed Club. University of Colorado

For the Worker, he covered the Moscow purge trials and the trial of the Scottsboro Boys and the Gastonia textile strike of 1929. He also reported on the Minneapolis General Strike of 1934.

Interviews included: Clarence Darrow, Emma Goldman, Lucy Parsons, Huey Long, Nadezhda Krupskaya, and Olga Knipper-Chekhova.

He wrote the Daily Worker's obituary cum condemnation of Walter Krivitsky in 1941.

John Fleming described him as follows:

Sender Garlin was a long-time literary apparatchik of the American Communist Party. He ended his days at a great age only quite recently as an elder statements of progressive community in Boulder, Colorado. He had a long association with The Daily Worker, for which he was for a time their man in Moscow. Later, he had a literary column in that paper called "The Constant Reader" in which he took notes of books to be praised or blamed.

As features editor for the Daily Worker, he oversaw "Woody Sez", the column penned by Woody Guthrie. Guthrie's column was "not considered strategic or basic" but did demonstrate that the CPUSA was "interested in the people."

He also worked for the Hotel and Restaurant Employees Union, managed the New York Heart Association's public affairs, and was editor of the Legal Brief of Physicians.

=== Boulder ===
In 1980, Garlin and wife Martha Millet Garlin (a poet) moved to Boulder from New York City to be near their son, Alexander Garlin. He founded the Social Issues Forum on the campus of the University of Colorado at Boulder. Through this organization, he brought Left and Liberal speakers to the campus. In 1982 he joined the university's Cultural Events Board. Speakers he helped to bring include: Howard Zinn, Michael Parenti, Angela Davis, Ann Fagan Ginger, and Milt Wolff (last commander of the Abraham Lincoln Battalion in the Spanish Civil War). He was also active in political groups, including the Committee in Solidarity with the People of El Salvador (CISPES), Left Hand Books, and the Rocky Mountain Peace Center.

=== Death ===
Garlin died at his home on December 6, 1999, at age 97. He was survived by wife Martha Millet Garlin, daughter Emily, son Alexander, granddaughter Annelise, son Victor, and granddaughters Amy and Rachel.

== Influence ==
In his 1952 memoir, Whittaker Chambers recalled that in 1925

there had once passed across the Columbia campus a high-strung, red-headed boy from an upstate college. He had slept overnight on the bare floor of a friend's room in one of the residence halls. He talked incessantly in a voice like a teletype machine; and what he talked about was the Soviet Union and Communism.

His name was Sender Garlin. I thought that Sender Garlin would probably know where to find the Communist Party. Presently I located him.

Garlin said that, in fact, there was no Communist Party. For reasons of expediency, the Communist Party which had just come up from underground, now called itself the Workers Party. He was not sure that he knew how to contact it or that he knew anyone in it. But if it turned out that he did, he would mention my name, and a man might presently come to see me."

I decided that Garlin knew exactly where to find the Communist Party and was telling me that he would put me in touch with it.

While reporting for the Bronx Home News, he introduced Chambers to Harry Freeman, younger brother of Joseph Freeman (who succeeded Chambers as editor of the New Masses magazine, while Garlin's younger sister, Tiba Willner (1906-1999), worked for many years at the New Masses as its promotional manager.).

Howard Zinn described Garlin's impact on him in the obituary he wrote.

== Works ==
- Ellis, Fred; Jacob Burck (1929). Sender Garlin (ed.). 1929 Red Cartoons, Reprinted From The Daily Worker. New York: Comprodaily Pub. Co.
- The "Real Huey P. Long (pamphlet, 1935)
- The Real Rickenbacker (pamphlet, 1943)
- The Truth About Reader's Digest (pamphlet, 1943)
- Is Dewey the Man? (pamphlet, 1944)
- Enemies of the Peace: Profile of the 'Hate-Russia' Gang (pamphlet, 1945)
- Red Tape and Barbed Wire: Close-Up of the McCarran Law In Action (pamphlet, 1952)
- William Dean Howells and the Haymarket Era (occasional paper, 1979)
- Three American Radicals (book, 1991)

== External sources ==
- Alternative Radio: Sender Garlin, "The Life and Times of Joe Hill" (audio)
- Tamiment Library - Oral History - Sender Garlin
