= Jerre Mangione =

American writer

- Born: Gerlando Mangione; 20 March 1909; Rochester, New York, U.S.
- Died: August 16, 1998 (aged 89)
- Education: Syracuse University
- Spouse: Patricia
- Parents: Gaspare Mangione (father); Josephine Polizzi (mother)
- Relatives: Chuck Mangione, Gap Mangione (nephews)

Gerlando "Jerre" Mangione (/mænˈdʒoʊni/ man-JOH-nee; March 20, 1909 – August 16, 1998) was an American writer and scholar of the "Sicilian-American experience".

== Early life and education ==
Mangione was born to Josephine (née Polizzi) and Gaspare Mangione in Rochester, New York. His parents both emigrated from Agrigento, Italy. He was one of four children. Mangione attended the East High School and wanted to be a writer. He worked as a busboy, theater extra, paperboy.

He attended Syracuse University in 1928 where he worked at The Daily Orange, did scholarly research on writer Stephen Crane. After his graduation in 1931, he was hired by Henry Luce to work at Finance desk at Time. In 1934, he started working for publisher Robert M. McBride.

In 1937, he left the publishing business to work as an Information specialist in Washington. He was also a graduate of the Federal Writers' Project, which he left in 1939.

== Career ==
Mangione joined University of Pennsylvania in 1961 to teach freshman composition program. In 1968, he became a full professor (of literature) and worked there until his retirement in 1978.

Mangione was “widely recognized by students of acculturation as a sensitive chronicler of the problems of negotiating the difficult passages between two cultures.”

He became famous upon the publication of his first book, Mount Allegro, a “classic autobiographical novel” about growing up in the Sicilian-American community of Rochester, New York. Mangione wrote Mount Allegro as a nonfiction memoir; however, his publisher, Houghton Mifflin, "insisted on publishing it as fiction because their sales department decided it would sell better with that label." Mangione consented only to changing the names of the people in the memoir, and he inserted a memorable tongue-in-cheek disclaimer: "The characters in this book are fictitious and have fictitious names. Anyone who thinks he recognizes himself in it is kindly asked to bear that in mind."

Mangione stated that one of the reasons for writing Mount Allegro was his desire to show a positive image of Sicilians in America. Up to that point he had "felt that the Sicilians in particular had been much maligned". He also maintained that the book could be seen as a sort of personal Pilgrim's Progress in his relationship to the Sicilians of Rochester: a voyage "from being a kind of confused Italian-American living in two cultures, to observing them and writing about them objectively".

He wrote in depth about the Sicilian-American experience during the internment of Italian Americans during World War II. His book Reunion in Sicily includes a story about a Sicilian-American internee who protested his innocence, to no avail, during his detainment. He was only released on parole when news came out that one of his children had been killed in a plane over Italy, so, therefore, he “couldn’t be very dangerous after all".

Two decades after the book appeared, the city of Rochester officially renamed Mangione's old neighborhood Mount Allegro, in tribute to his book.

After publication of his final book, La Storia: Five Centuries of the Italian-American Experience, Mangione was honored by the Library of Congress with an exhibition of his works and papers.

== Awards ==
Mangione won Guggenheim (1946) and Fulbright fellowships. His book The Dream and the Deal was published with research grants from the Rockefeller Foundation and the American Philosophical Society.

== Family ==
Mangione married Patricia, a painter from Seattle, in 1940. His 1965 novel Night Search is dedicated to her. Jerre's brother, Frank "Papa" Mangione (July, 1910 – August, 2001), whose life is chronicled in Jerre's work Mount Allegro (1943), is the father of musicians Chuck Mangione and Gap Mangione.

== Books ==
- Mount Allegro (1943)
- The Ship and the Flames (1948)
- Reunion in Sicily (1950)
- Night Search (1965)
- Life sentences for everybody (1966)
- Passion for Sicilians: The World Around Danilo Dolci (1968)
- America is Also Italian (1969)
- The Dream and the Deal: The Federal Writers Project, 1935-43 (1972)
- An Ethnic at Large: Memoirs of America in the 30s and 40s (1978)
- La Storia: Five Centuries of the Italian American Experience, with Ben Morreale (1992)
