= Nathan Asch =

American writer (1902–1964)

Nathan Asch (July 10, 1902 – December 23, 1964) was an American writer.

== Biography ==
Nathan Asch was born in Warsaw in 1902, the son of the Yiddish novelist Sholem Asch and his wife Mathilda Szpiro. After living in France, Germany, and Switzerland, the family settled in the United States when Asch was 13 years old. In 1923, Asch moved to Paris where he met Ernest Hemingway. His first story "The Voice of the Office", published in the June 1924 edition of The Transatlantic Review, was praised by Hemingway. Asch worked as a screenwriter in Hollywood but quit to travel around the country by bus and report on the experiences of ordinary people during the Depression. Asch criticized Hollywood from a Marxist perspective, describing it as a place of "the last manufactory of bourgeois romanticism... with no newspapers, no opinions, [and] no social consciousness". He drew on his bus trips in his book The Road: In Search of America, a book that combines literary fragments and reporting to depict American life in the 1930s.

During the Spanish Civil War, Asch collaborated with his friend Josephine Herbst on a play about the conflict called The Spanish Road but it was not produced due to Communist members of the Theatre Union who disagreed with the work's political viewpoint. Asch was associated with a circle of leftist literary critics, including Muriel Rukeyser, Stanley Burnshaw, and Mike Gold. His four novels were initially popular in Germany, through Hermynia Zür Muhlen's translations but his books could not be published after 1936 in Germany or Austria since Asch was Jewish. With his books banned in Germany, Asch supported himself by writing for the Federal Writers' Project. Asch, who had previously served in the Navy during World War I, was a technical sergeant during World War II, driving the photographer Margaret Bourke-White in a jeep. He did not publish any books after the war, but he taught writing workshops in Marin County.

In contrast to his father's works, Nathan Asch's writing was considered to be more modernist and experimental. His works focused on "the victims of modern life", such as the middle-class office workers in The Office. Similarly, Pay Day is a modernist depiction of a twelve-hour period in a Manhattan office, on the day of the execution of Sacco and Vanzetti. Comparing the two novelists, Malcolm Cowley said that Nathan Asch wrote "more lyrically...but lacked the father's simple vigor and breadth of conception". Since both men were writing at the same time, the two novelists had a complicated relationship, with Nathan Asch recalling that he "loved my father and hated him and had also been completely alienated from him." Nathan Asch wrote that he never learned to read Yiddish and could only read his father's books in translation.

== Bibliography ==
=== Books ===
- The Office (Harcourt & Brace, 1925)
- Love in Chartres (A. & C. Boni, 1927)
- Pay Day (Brewer & Warren, 1930)
- The Valley (Macmillan, 1935)
- The Road: In Search of America (Norton, 1937)

=== Stories ===
- "The Voice of the Office," Transatlantic Review, June 1924
- "Marc Kranz," Transatlantic Review, August 1924
- "Gertrude Donovan," Transatlantic Review, December 1924
- "The Bus-Boy," New Masses, May 1926
- "The Country," American Caravan, 1927
- "In the City," American Caravan 2, 1928
- "Bravery," Liberty, July 12, 1930
- "Dying in Carcassonne," Forum and Century, November 1930
- "Moses," The New Yorker, April 2, 1932
- "Mary," Contact, May 1932
- "Mr. Bromley's Tonsils," The New Yorker, April 28, 1934
- "Truth, Beauty, and Efficiency," The New Yorker, November 2, 1935
- "Route 61," The New Republic, January 15, 1936
- "Stopover," Partisan Review, March 1936
- "High Gear," Partisan Review, April 1936
- "Be Careful, Mrs. Hopkins!" Life and Letters To-Day, December 1936
- "Deep South," The New Yorker, April 10, 1937
- "Copperhead," The New Yorker, September 11, 1937
- "Heart's Desire," American Stuff, 1937
- "5 to 7," The New Yorker, May 18, 1940
- "The Works," The New Yorker, July 27, 1940
- "The Secret," Redbook, December 1940
- "A Home for Emma," The Yale Review, 1941–42
- "Late-Afternoon Sun," The New Yorker, August 8, 1942
- "Barbara," Harper's Bazaar, February 1943
- "The Lake," Virginia Quarterly Review 22.3, Summer 1946
- "Young Man on His Way," The New Yorker, June 22, 1946
- "Inland, Western Sea," The New Yorker, April 29, 1950
- "Business," American Aphrodite, 1951
- "The Game," Commentary, March 1953
- "Arthur," New Editions 1, Fall 1956
- "Women of Munich," Contact, July–August 1964
