= James S. Allen =

American historian

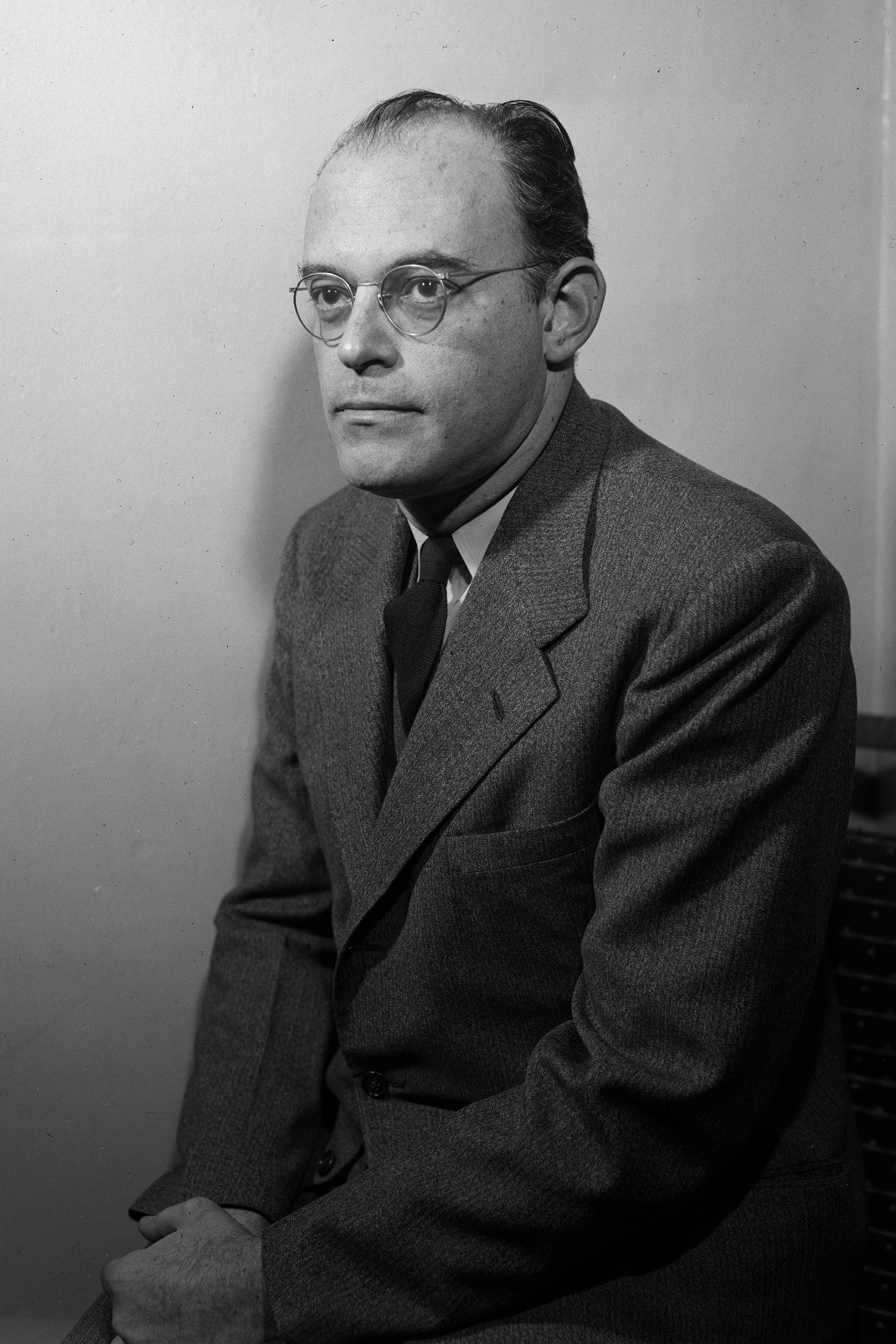
- Allen in 1946
- Born: Sol Auerbach; 1906; Philadelphia, Pennsylvania, U.S.
- Died: 1986 (aged 79–80)
- Education: University of Pennsylvania
- Years active: 1928–1986
- Employer: International Publishers
- Predecessor: Alexander Trachtenberg
- Political party: Communist Party USA
- Spouse: Isabelle Allen

James S. "Jim" Allen (born Sol Auerbach; 1906–1986) was an American Marxist historian, journalist, editor, activist, and functionary of the Communist Party USA. Allen is best remembered as the author and editor of over two dozen books and pamphlets and as one of the party's leading experts on African American history.

Allen is credited with helping to save from execution the young black men charged in the Scottsboro case by his prompt and relentless publicity of the case, which helped make their trial a cause célèbre.

== Biography ==
=== Early years ===
Sol Auerbach, later known by the pseudonym James S. Allen, was born in Philadelphia, Pennsylvania, in 1906. He was the son of ethnic Jewish parents who arrived in America from the Russian Empire the same year. Upon completion of high school, Allen enrolled at the University of Pennsylvania, where he studied philosophy.

A committed radical from his collegiate days, Auerbach traveled to the Soviet Union in 1927, as part of the first American student delegation there. Auerbach was expelled from college in 1928 for radical activities. He joined the Communist Party and began writing for the party newspaper, The Daily Worker. Auerbach succeeded Whittaker Chambers as "foreign news writer".

Auerbach was soon promoted to the editorship of Labor Defender, official organ of the International Labor Defense, the Communist Party's mass organization dedicated to civil rights and legal aid matters.

=== Party work in South ===
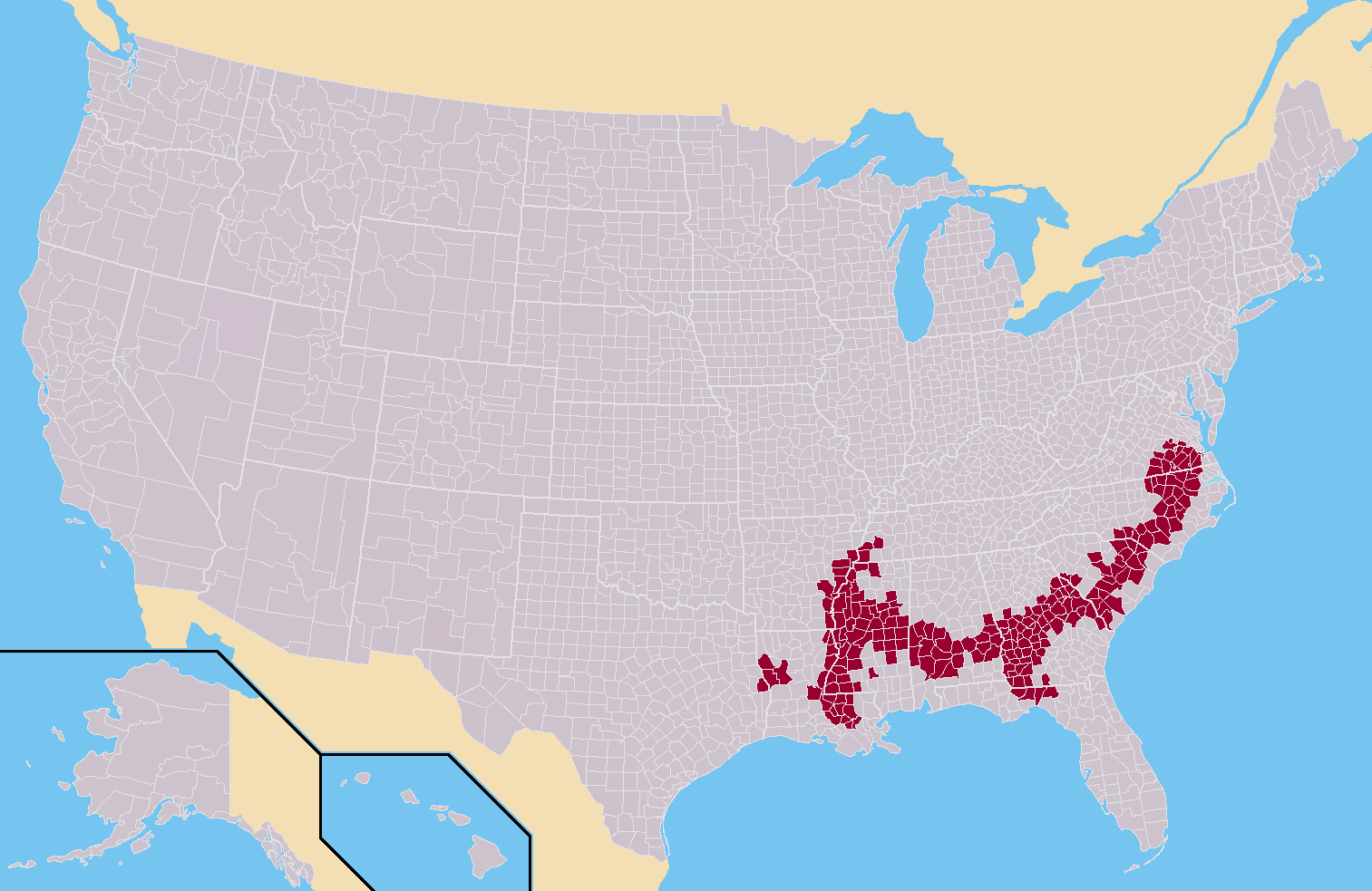
Southern counties with a population at least 40% African-American in 2000.

During his formative years in Philadelphia, Auerbach had developed a strong interest in African American life, which led to his appointment in 1930 as editor of the Communist Party's first newspaper produced south of the Mason–Dixon line, The Southern Worker. Auerbach adopted the pseudonym "James S. Allen" around that date and traveled to Chattanooga, Tennessee, with his wife, Isabelle Allen, to establish and edit the weekly paper.

Necessarily produced under clandestine conditions, The Southern Worker bore a false dateline claiming to be produced in Birmingham, Alabama, in an effort to confuse local police and the Federal Bureau of Investigation (FBI). According to Isabelle Allen, authorities never were able to identify the shop that produced the paper, partly due to the struggling printer's simultaneous production of a newspaper for the Ku Klux Klan, an ideal cover for a secret side job.

The Southern Worker was launched on August 16, 1930, with a print run of 3,000 copies. Although billed as "a paper of and for both the white and black workers and farmers," the content was heavily skewed towards coverage of the daily life and problems of the region's black population.

In this capacity Allen consistently advocated for the Communist Party's political line of the day, which included a demand for self-determination of the so-called "Black Belt" of the South, then populated by nearly half of the country's African American population.

James S. Allen was the editor of The Southern Worker, a regional newspaper of the Communist Party USA, targeted particularly to Southern blacks.

Despite breathless speculation then and later that the communist mobilizing slogan "Self-Determination for the Black Belt" was a call for national secession, Allen later claimed that "we weren't stupid". For all the brashness of the "self-determination" slogan, historian Mark Solomon believed the actual meaning of the phrase was rather more modest:

Self-determination was defined as democracy at its essence: self-government, self-organization, social and economic equality, the right of blacks to run their own lives without the relentless terror and racism that dogged their steps and made every waking day a living hell.

Allen's actual time spent in the South was limited, as he was forced to return to New York in 1931 by the pressure of life in hiding and the "monotonous" and "depressing" job of editing an underground newspaper to which Southerners were too frightened to subscribe. Allen remained a member of the Party's Southern District committee, however, and in that capacity, he played a prominent role in all of the party's major regional activities during the early 1930s: the organizing of Alabama sharecroppers, the Harlan, Kentucky miners' strike and the Scottsboro case.

=== Scottsboro case ===
The American Negro, 1932

Allen's influence in the Scottsboro case was particularly important, with Yale University historian Glenda Elizabeth Gilmore contending that "we might never have heard of the Scottsboro case if Sol Auerbach, using his Party name, James S. Allen, had not arrived in Chattanooga, Tennessee, in mid-July 1930." Allen was listening to the radio in his Chattanooga apartment in March 1931 when he heard that police in Paint Rock, Alabama, had removed nine young black men from a freight train and charged them with rape. Auerbach promptly alerted the party's International Labor Defense, which quickly became involved in the defense.

The nine defendants in the case, collectively called the "Scottsboro Boys" after the city in which they were indicted, were aged 13 to 20 and had been traveling aboard a freight train to search for work in Tennessee. They were not traveling as a group and some did not know the others until they met in jail, pulled from the train by a mob of 200 whites following false accusations of rape by two women seeking to avoid prostitution charges.

The case was publicized relentlessly by Allen in the pages of the Southern Worker and throughout the Communist Party press, with the story crossing over to mainstream press coverage. Gilmore writes, "Without the spotlight that Jim Allen quickly focused on the trials it is most likely that the 'Boys' would have been dead by fall, lost among the thousands of unknown Southern black men executed legally and illegally."

=== Emissary to Philippines ===
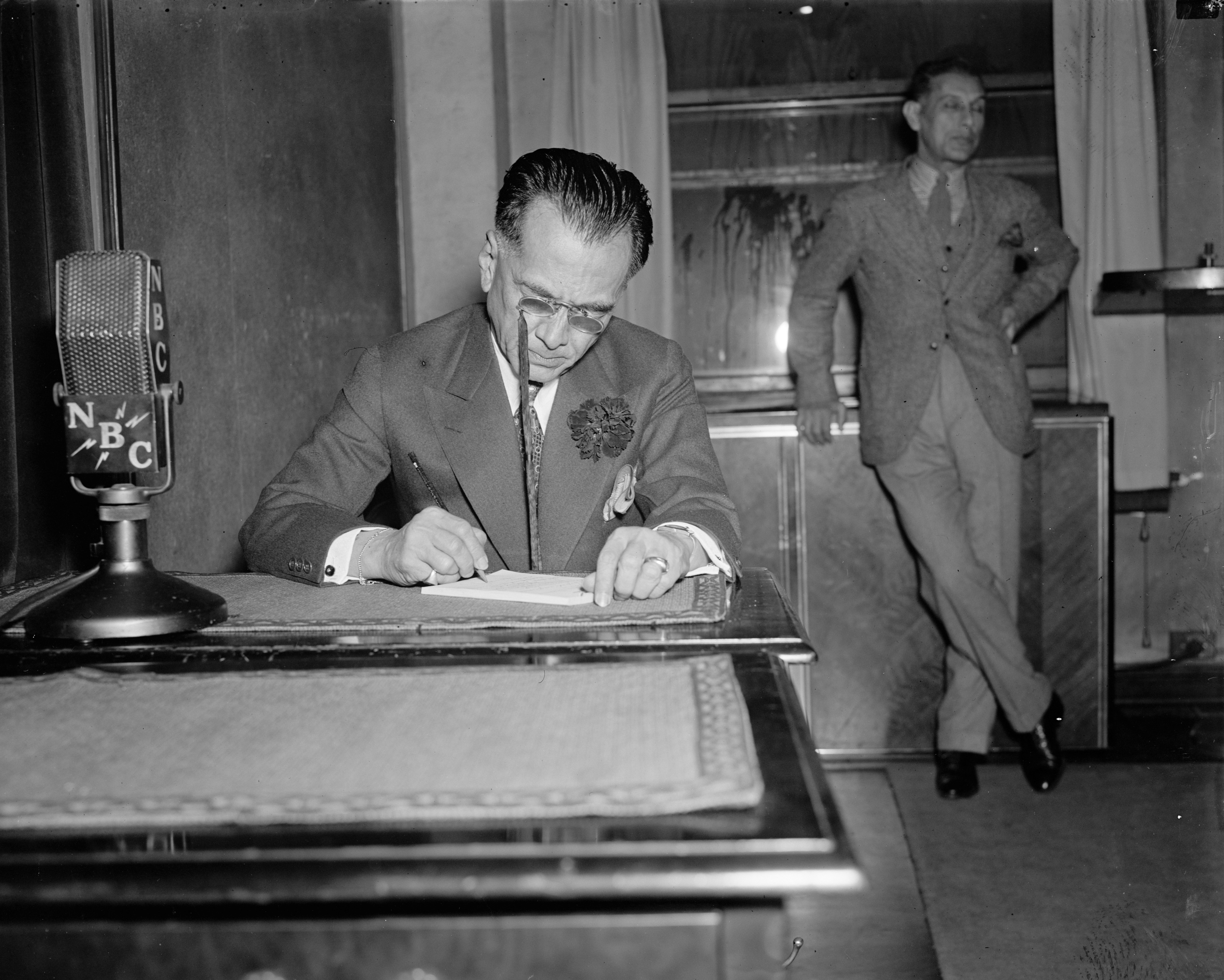
Philippines President Manuel Quezon preparing for an April 1937 radio broadcast. Allen was instrumental in gaining the release of jailed Philippine communist leaders through Quezón.

At the behest of the Communist International (Comintern), Allen was sent to Manila, the capital of the Philippines, then an American protectorate, on two missions in an attempt to end sectarian squabbling and to achieve unity between the Philippine Communist Party (not to be confused with the later Communist Party of the Philippines) and the rival Socialist Party of the Philippines (SPP). In accord with the strategy of the popular front, the Comintern then sought to build broad alliances against the rising tide of fascism and was therefore interested in minimizing conflict between communists and socialists.

The first of Allen's trips to the Philippines came in 1936. Allen's mission was to convince Crisanto Evangelista, the General Secretary of the CPP, and his jailed comrades to accept a conditional pardon from Philippine President Manuel Quezon and to gain their freedom so they could lead the fight against Japanese militarism. Allen then spoke personally with Quezón and convinced him of the urgent need for Philippine unity in the face of the Japanese Empire's expansionism in the region. Allen was successful, and Evangelista and the other imprisoned communist leaders were released on December 31, 1936.

Allen returned to the Philippines in September 1938. His new mission was to expand the conditional pardons that had been granted to Evangelista and his associates to the full restoration of civil rights so that they could mobilize radical Philippine workers against fascism by public meetings and mass demonstrations.

Allen presented Quezón with petitions gathered by various labor organizations and successfully made the case for a full pardon for the communist leaders. An absolute pardon was granted on December 24, 1938, in the context of a Christmas amnesty.

Next, Allen sought to broker actual unity between the two parties, conferring both with the CPP leadership and with Pedro Abad Santos, the president of the SPP, on the matter. Allen used the utmost diplomacy in making his case to Abad Santos to bury tactical differences with the communists and to accept a merger, in the interest of constructing a stronger organization in opposition to fascism. Unity between the organizations was achieved at the Third National Congress of the Communist Party of the Philippines, from October 29 to 31, 1938.

Allen addressed the gathering, conveying the greetings of CPUSA General Secretary Earl Browder, who had himself been a Comintern representative to the Philippines in 1927. The united organization temporarily took the cumbersome name "Communist Party of the Philippines (merger of the Communist and Socialist Parties)" until it later adopted the simpler "Communist Party of the Philippines" again. Evangelista was named the National Chairman and Abad Santos the Vice Chairman of the newly united organization.

=== Later career ===
Allen was then assigned a position as the foreign editor of the Sunday Worker, a weekly newspaper that had been launched in January 1936 to try to reach a broader audience than that of the more intense and authoritative Daily Worker. The Sunday Worker was edited by Al Richmond, who later remembered Allen as "a scholarly, serene man who did the serious political commentary and analysis".

Allen was drafted into the US Army in 1944.

During the Cold War, Allen was compelled to appear as a witness before the House Un-American Activities Committee.

From the 1940s onward, Allen was a respected author in the Soviet Bloc. He was published there in connection with American imperialism, economic crisis, international economics and international political relations. Up to the 1960s, he was published in Russian, Hungarian, Chinese, German, Polish, Estonian, and Romanian.

Allen testifies before the U.S. Senate, March 1953

On February 21, 1952, Allen was called before the Senate Internal Security Committee, chaired by Senator Pat McCarran of Nevada, in conjunction with its investigation of the Institute of Pacific Relations.

During the 1956 to 1958 factional crisis of the party, Allen placed his allegiance with the hardline pro-Soviet wing against a dissident faction calling for liberalization of internal party life and its distancing from the Communist Party of the Soviet Union. When the leader of the hardliners, Gus Hall, emerged triumphant and was named General Secretary in 1958, Allen became a member of the governing Central Committee. Allen was also tapped then to serve as secretary of the National Program Committee, in charge of developing programmatic and educational documents for the party, remaining until 1966. Allen then helped develop early drafts of the party program.

While Allen staunchly supported the Soviet Union during its armed suppression of the Hungarian Revolution of 1956, he was critical of similar action in 1968 against the Prague Spring. His perspective, expressed internally at closed meetings of the party leadership, put Allen at odds with Hall and other top officials of the party. Since he did not express his opposition publicly, Allen was not expelled, but at the next National Convention, in 1972, he was quietly removed from the Central Committee, effectively cashiering him from the ranks of top party leadership.

=== Book publisher ===
From 1951, Allen worked for International Publishers (IP), the Communist Party's publishing house. While Allen had briefly headed the publisher during founder Alexander Trachtenberg's prosecution in the 1950s under the Smith Act, he found IP in dire financial straits when he began his second stint as a publisher in 1962:

When I returned to IP in 1962 as president and editor-in-chief the house faced bankruptcy. Its publishing program had practically ceased, its debt to the publishers' services was so great without any prospect of payment in sight that the printers refused to undertake new work and the binders refused to release our books in stock. Fortunately, Trachty had some reserve funds that I drew upon immediately. I also arranged small loans from a number of our devoted readers. I also sent out an unprecedented appeal for donations to keep the publishing house going. We were thus able to meet the payroll and office expenses, and also to pay off enough of our debt to resume publishing.

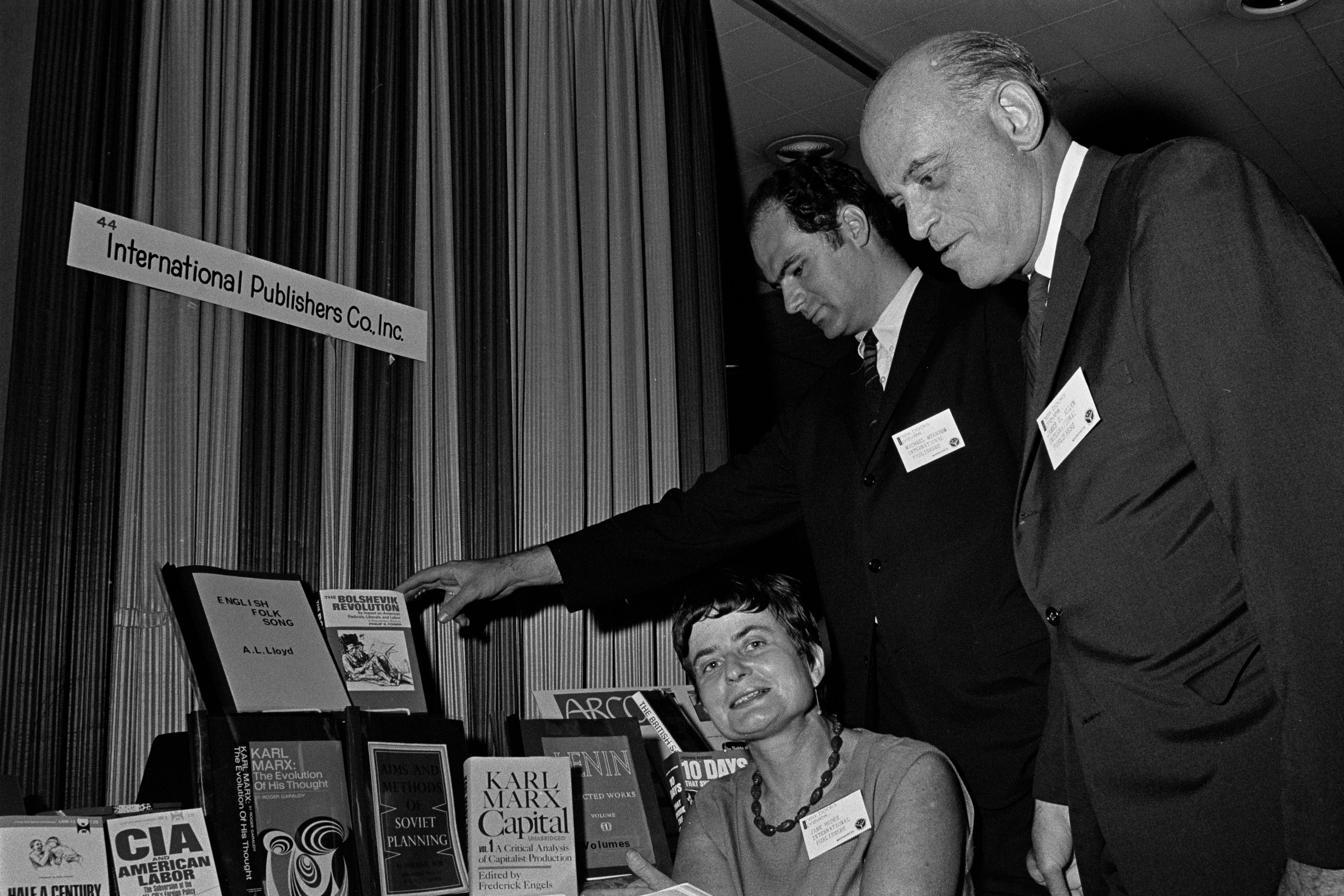
Allen (right) reviews an International Publishers exhibit with fellow Communists Michael Myerson (left) and Jane Hodes (seated) at a fall book preview exhibition at the Statler Hilton Hotel in New York City, September 1967

Allen recalled that he initially did not wish to stay in book publishing, as he had no background in business affairs and understood that it would leave little time for research and writing. However, the retiring founder, Trachtenberg, had prevailed upon Allen to accept the position as chief of the financially troubled firm.

At IP, Allen was responsible for introducing the production of a series of inexpensive "New World Paperbacks" and made reissues of the classic Marxist canon more readily available to a new generation of political activists and college students. During a cross-country sales trip, Allen had been convinced that the book trade was going to be dominated by the paperback format and that if IP were to survive in the new environment, it would need to retool its offerings. Old sets of book sheets not yet bound into covers were gathered up at the bindery, some having laid unused for years, and a new set of cover designs was commissioned. Fifteen titles were thus assembled at minimal cost and launched en masse onto the market, promoted by a special catalog. The inexpensive series gained ready acceptance in the market.

Allen worked to expand the number of black authors on IP's list, reissuing works by W. E. B. Du Bois, personally editing the autobiography of communist New York City Council member Benjamin J. Davis Jr., and adding works by Henry Winston, Claude Lightfoot, and others.

In 1968, Allen was selected as the American editor of the 50-volume Marx-Engels Collected Works project, a joint publishing project between IP, Lawrence and Wishart in the United Kingdom and Progress Publishers in Moscow. The three-way nature of the project was due to the project having been proposed to Moscow more or less simultaneously by the Communist Party of Great Britain and the CPUSA. Whereas interest in the project on the American side outside of Allen was tepid, the British assembled a team of top party intellectuals, headed by Maurice Cornforth, to work with the Soviet publishing agency to make the massive project a reality.

Allen and Cornforth were instrumental in the decision to integrate the correspondence between Marx and Engels with the mass of letters between each of these and other correspondents, a significant change from previously published editions in other languages. The first volume of the edition saw print in 1975, and the 50th and final volume was published only in 2004, many years after Allen's death.

Allen headed IP until 1972.

=== Death and legacy ===
Allen died in 1986.

Allen's papers are held by the Tamiment Library and Robert F. Wagner Labor Archives at New York University in New York City. The collection includes approximately 1,500 pages of investigative documents dealing with Allen that were written over the years by special agents of the FBI. Also included is the manuscript of an unpublished memoir entitled "Visions and Revisions", part of which was published posthumously, as Organizing in the Depression South: A Communist's Memoir in 2001.

== Bibliography ==
=== Books and pamphlets ===
- American Communism and Black Americans: A Documentary History, 1919–1929. Editor, with Philip S. Foner. Philadelphia: Temple University Press, 1987.
- The American Negro. New York: International Publishers, 1932.
- Atomic Energy and Society. New York, International Publishers, 1949.
- Atomic Imperialism: The State, Monopoly, and the Bomb. New York, International Publishers, 1952.
- The Cartel System. New York: International Publishers, n.d. [c. 1946].
- The Crisis in India. New York: Workers Library Publishers, 1942.
- Disarmament and the American Economy: A Symposium. Contributor, edited by Herbert Aptheker. New York: New Century Publishers, 1960.
- The Economic Crisis and the Cold War: Reports. Edited with Doxey A. Wilkerson, introduction by William Z. Foster. New York: New Century Publishers, 1949.
- The Lessons of Cuba. New York: New Century Publishers, 1961.
- Marshall Plan: Recovery or War?. New York: New Century Publishers, 1948.
- Negro Liberation. New York: International Publishers, 1938.
- The Negro Question in the United States. New York, International Publishers, 1936.
- The Negroes in a Soviet America. With James W. Ford. New York: Workers Library Publishers, 1935.
- On Democratic Centralism: Name and Form. n.c: n.p., n.d.
- Organizing in the Depression South: A Communist's Memoir. Minneapolis: MEP Publications, 2001.
- The Philippine Left on the Eve of World War II. Foreword by William Pomeroy. Minneapolis: MEP Publications, 1993.
- The Radical Left on the Eve of War: A Political Memoir. Quezon City, Philippines: Foundation for Nationalist Studies, 1985.
- Reconstruction: The Battle for Democracy (1865–1876). New York, International Publishers, 1937.
- Smash the Scottsboro Lynch Verdict. New York: Workers Library Publishers, 1933.
- Thomas Paine: Selections from his Writings. Editor. New York: International Publishers, 1937.
- The United States and the Common Market. New York: New Century Publishers, 1962.
- Who Owns America?. New York, New Century Publishers, 1946.
- World Cooperation for Post-War Prosperity. New York, New Century Publishers, 1945.
- World Monopoly and Peace. New York, International Publishers, 1946. Foreign editions in Russian 1948, Polish 1950, German and Estonian 1951.

=== Articles ===
- "America and Neutrality," National Issues, vol. 1 (1939), pp. 13–16.
- "American imperialism and the war," The Communist, vol. 18 (1939), pp. 1046–1053.
- "The American Road to Socialism," Political Affairs, vol. 37 (1958), pp. 8–27.
- "Awakening in the Cotton Belt," New Masses, vol. 8 (1932), pp. 11–12.
- "The Black Belt: Area of Negro Majority," The Communist, vol. 13 (1934), pp. 581–599.
- "Bretton Woods and World Security," The Communist, vol. 23 (1944), pp. 1078–1086.
- "The Communist way out," Crisis, vol. 42 (1935), pp. 134–135.
- "Democratic Revival and the Marxists," Masses & Mainstream, vol. 8 (1955), pp. 1–11.
- "Enlightened American Imperialism in the Philippines," Political Affairs, vol. 25 (1946), pp. 526–540.
- "The Far Eastern Front in the War against the Axis," The Communist, vol. 21 (1942), pp. 143–162.
- "Farm Production for Defense," The Communist, vol. 20 (1941), pp. 910–916.
- "The Farmers and the Struggle against the War Program," The Communist, vol. 19 (1940), pp. 628–648.
- "Guests of the Russian Prolestud" (as Sol Auerbach), The New Student (1927)
- "Lenin and the American Negro," The Communist, vol. 13 (1934), pp. 53–61.
- "The Negro Question," Political Affairs, 25 (1946), pp. 1132–1150.
- "The New State in the Far East," Political Affairs, vol. 24 (1945), pp. 441–447.
- "The New War Economy," Political Affairs, vol. 27 (1948), pp. 1055–1074.
- "The Pacific Front in the Global War," The Communist, vol. 21 (1942), pp. 1012–1020.
- "The Policy of Anti-Soviet Encirclement," Political Affairs, vol. 26 (1947), pp. 563–570.
- "Problems of Foreign Policy," Political Affairs, vol. 36 (1957), pp. 19–31.
- "Prologue to the Liberation of the Negro," The Communist, vol. 12 (1933), pp. 147–170.
- "The Scottsboro Struggle,"The Communist, vol. 12 (1933), pp. 437–448.
- "Some Lessons of the Fateful Decade," The Communist, vol. 22 (1943), pp. 258–265.
- "The Soviet Nations and Teheran," The Communist, vol. 23 (1944), pp. 206–216.
- "Die Vereinigten Staaten und der Gemeinsame Markt," Imperialistische "Integration" in Westeuropa (1962), pp. 183–195
- "We Can Win in 1943," The Communist, vol. 22 (1943), pp. 680–687.
- "The World Assembly at San Francisco," Political Affairs, vol. 24 (1945), pp. 291–301.
- "Marxist Publisher," Peter Meyer Filardo (ed.), American Communist History, vol. 10, no. 3 (December 2011), pp. 285–315. —Excerpt from unpublished autobiography.
