= Joseph North (writer) =

American journalist and editor (1904–1976)

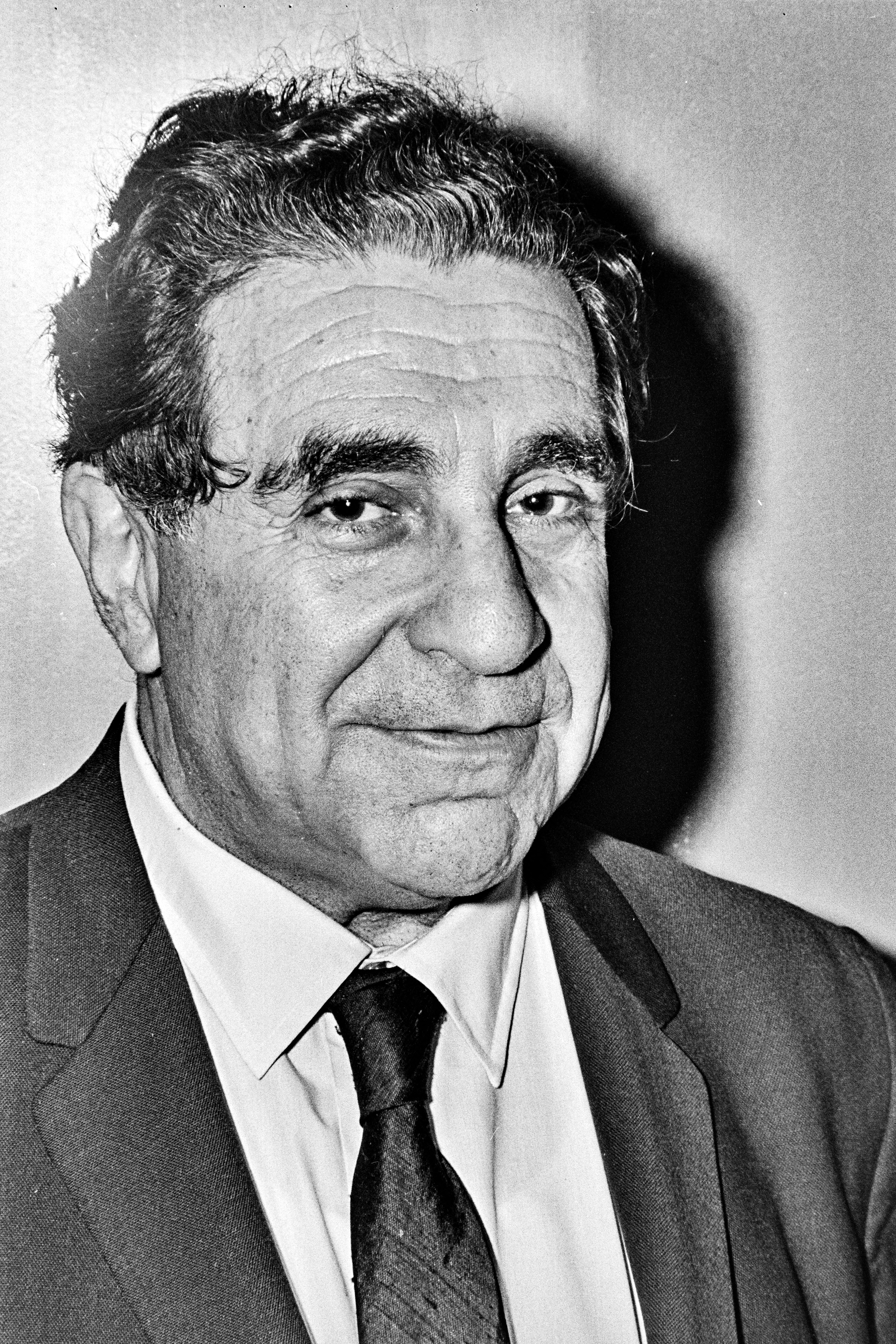
- North in 1968
- Born: Jacob Soifer; May 25, 1904; Near Nikolaev, Kherson Governorate, Russian Empire
- Died: December 20, 1976 (aged 72); San Juan, Puerto Rico, U.S.
- Citizenship: American
- Education: University of Pennsylvania
- Occupations: Journalist, editor, author
- Years active: 1928–1975
- Employer(s): New Masses, The Daily Worker
- Known for: Editor of New Masses magazine
- Notable work: New Masses: An Anthology of the Rebel Thirties
- Spouse(s): Helen Oken (m. 1931; div. 1957) Augusta Strong (m. 1963)
- Children: 3
- Relatives: Alex North (brother)

Joseph North (born Jacob Soifer; May 25, 1904 – December 20, 1976) was an American journalist, author and magazine editor. He is best remembered as a longtime editor of New Masses, a literary and artistic magazine closely associated with the Communist Party USA (CPUSA). He was also a columnist and correspondent for The Daily Worker for many decades. In the latter role, he covered key 20th-century events, including the Spanish Civil War, World War II, Civil Rights movement, Cuban Revolution, and Vietnam War.

== Early years ==
Joseph North was born Jacob Soifer on May 25, 1904, to Jewish parents Jesse Soifer and Beila Yasnitz. His birthplace was near the city of Nikolayev in Southern Ukraine. When Jacob was nine months old, the Soifer family immigrated to the United States and settled in Chester, Pennsylvania.

Jesse was a blacksmith and skilled mechanic, and Bessie ran a small grocery store. In 1915, Jesse died on the operating table during appendicitis surgery (the family later learned it was a botched operation). To help his mother make ends meet, Jacob began working in a textile mill at age 12, and he worked summers in the local Chester shipyards. He meanwhile continued his education and graduated with a BA from the University of Pennsylvania.

== Career ==
Following graduation, and with an interest in writing and journalism, Jacob Soifer landed a series of cub reporter jobs on Pennsylvania newspapers such as The Chester Times. On May Day 1929, while reporting on a free speech demonstration organized by the International Labor Defense (ILD) in Bethlehem, Pennsylvania, he was clubbed by police and thrown in jail. His cellmate was a Communist who influenced Soifer's thinking. When he got out of jail, Soifer volunteered at the Philadelphia office of the ILD. He also began writing articles for Labor Defense, the ILD's monthly magazine, and for Labor Unity, the publication of the Trade Union Educational League. He joined the CPUSA at this time. Later in 1929, he accepted a job in the publicity office of the national ILD headquarters in New York. Because of the labor organization's Communist reputation, and to protect his family from potential harassment, Soifer started signing his articles using the pseudonym "Joe North" or "Joseph North". Soon the rest of the family followed suit and adopted the "North" surname, including his younger brother who would become the famed film composer Alex North.

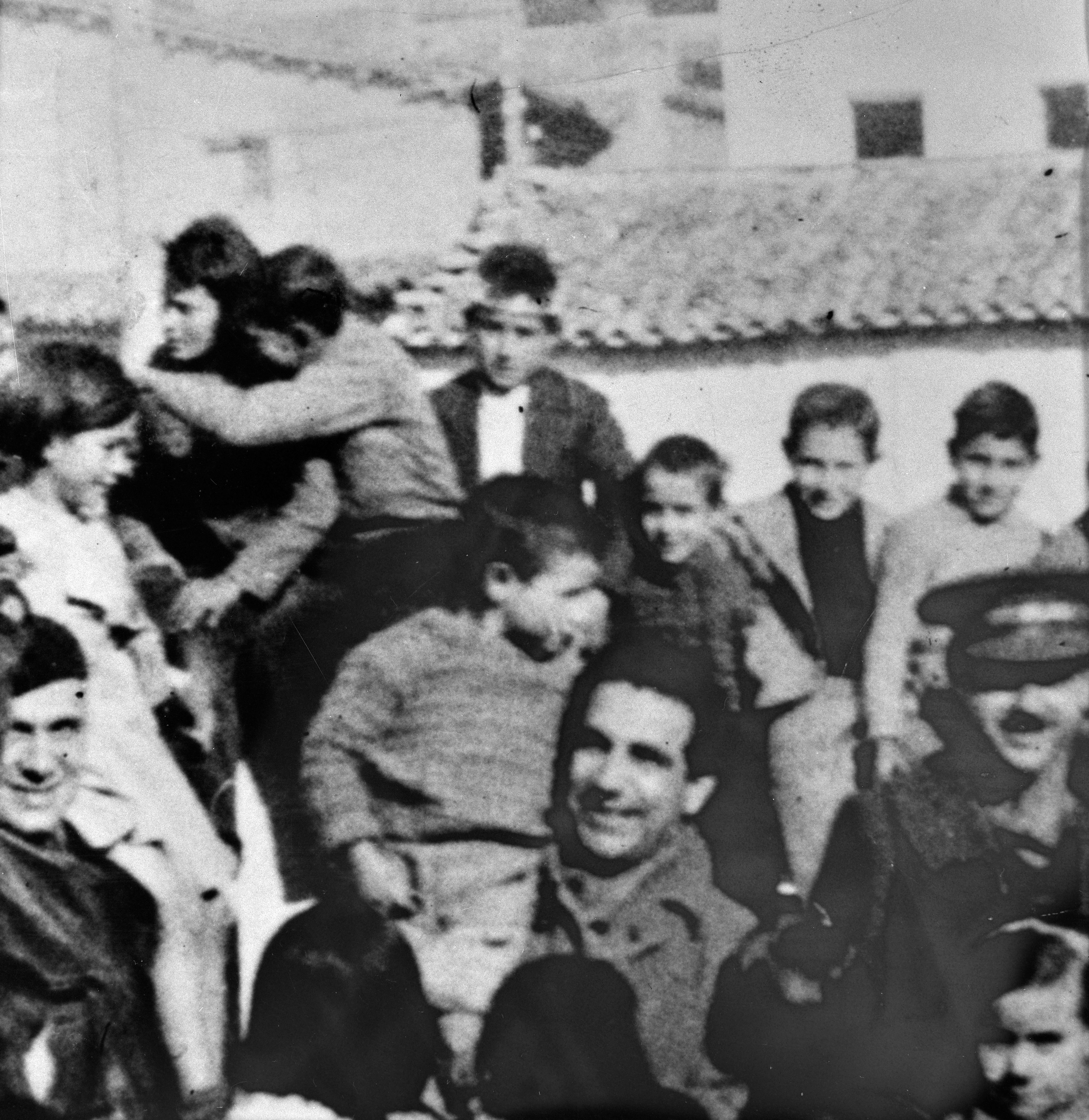
North holds a Spanish child on his shoulder during Christmas celebrations in Teruel, 1937

In 1932 and 1933, North was co-editor of Labor Defense. Throughout much of the 1930s, he was involved with the New Masses magazine. He contributed articles and served on its editorial staff in 1934 and 1935. After a hiatus for the Spanish Civil War, he returned in 1939 as New Masses editor, a position he held until 1948. During his tenure at the magazine, and in his travels and reporting as a foreign correspondent, North came in contact with many notable writers and artists. His 1958 memoir, No Men Are Strangers, describes encounters he had with people such as Theodore Dreiser, Lincoln Steffens, Edmund Wilson, Ernest Hemingway, Thomas Wolfe, Dorothy Parker, Louis Aragon, and Charlie Chaplin. But North's steadfast allegiance to CPUSA doctrine sometimes caused friction with his acquaintances. Howard Fast wrote about North:

[He] was to become, in the years ahead, one of my closest friends. He was a big, shaggy bear of a man, always unkempt even when he dressed with the greatest care, goodhearted, good-natured. He reminded me of Friar Tuck in the Robin Hood tales, a man without rancor or hostility, a man I loved and who became like a brother to me. With all that, he had given himself to orthodoxy, and that is a terrible curse – in a Communist Party or a religion or in politics or in any system of thinking.

In a similar vein, North recounted an incident in the Spanish Civil War when he and Hemingway were holed up together in a room in Madrid during an artillery barrage from a Nazi battery:

After the third drink, he [Hemingway] began to laud the Lincoln Brigade, their courage about which he had frequently written. And then, eyeing me, he said suddenly, "I like Communists when they're soldiers: when they're priests, I hate them." "Priests?" I repeated, startled. "Yes, priests, the commissars who hand down the papal bulls," he glared. I reminded him that he once confessed he had never read a word of Marx, or ever truly knew a Communist. "That air of authority your leaders wear, like cassocks," he insisted. Evidently one drink too many roused his belligerency.

Next, Hemingway started shadowboxing around the room. After several minutes, he toweled off his sweat: "I keep trim that way," he laughed, "to fight the commissars. I suppose you stay fit memorizing a chapter of Das Kapital." Despite these barbs, Hemingway wrote a complimentary Foreword to North's 1939 pamphlet, Men in the ranks, the story of 12 Americans in Spain.

In his decades as a Daily Worker columnist, North developed a writing style that mixed humor with serious commentary. For example, during the 1936 Summer Olympics in Berlin, he wrote a piece entitled "That Sprinter, Hitler". It opens with wry remarks about Hitler's hurried exits from the track stadium whenever an African-American athlete such as Jesse Owens won a medal:

It's not, I admit, on the best of authority, but I hear that Hitler will be asked to compete in the Olympics—in the 100-meter sprints. His dashes out of the stadium when the Negro athletes stride in with championships have been noticed all over the world. The Fuhrer's fast. Jesse Owens romps in with another championship, and presto! Hitler spurts the other way. They say the dictator can do the 100-meter dash in close to nothing flat whenever a Negro crosses the line.

For several years starting in the late 1940s, North lectured at the Jefferson School of Social Science, which was included on the Attorney General's List of Subversive Organizations. During the Second Red Scare of the 1950s, North became a target of investigation by the United States Congress. On 3 May 1956, he was compelled to testify before the Senate Internal Security Subcommittee. He invoked the Fifth Amendment and refused to answer questions pertaining to his CPUSA membership, or his alleged contacts with Soviet intelligence in World War II.

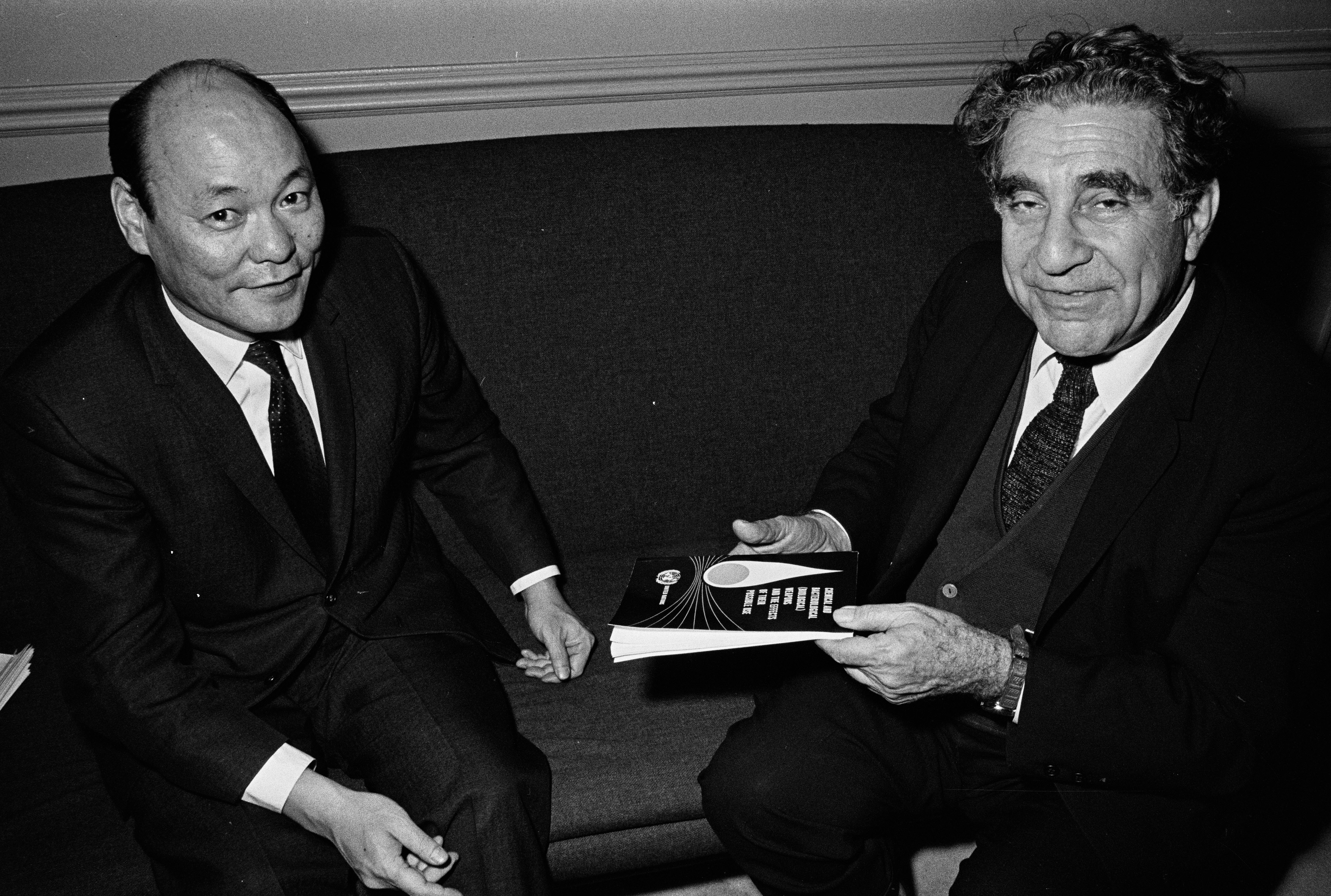
North (right) with Mongolian UN Ambassador Mangalyn Dugersuren, December 11, 1969

North reported on the Cuban Revolution and its aftermath for The Daily Worker. While in Cuba in April 1961, he accompanied Prime Minister Fidel Castro's forces when they repelled the U.S.-backed Bay of Pigs Invasion. In 1969, North edited the book New Masses: An Anthology of the Rebel Thirties, which collected representative New Masses writings from 1934 through 1940.

== Personal life and death ==
North married Helen Oken in 1931. During the last four of his sixteen months covering the Spanish Civil War, she was in Spain also, working in the medical service. After the war, they settled in Manhattan and raised three children: Daniel, Susan, and Nora. Like her husband, Helen was active in the CPUSA. On numerous occasions, she had to assume the breadwinner role since Joseph's job as a journalist did not provide enough income to support the family, and he was often abroad on assignments. She and Joseph divorced in 1957. He remarried in 1963 to Augusta Strong, a Daily Worker reporter and editor. They remained married until her death in September 1976.

Joseph North died of leukemia on December 20, 1976, aged 72, at a hospital in San Juan, Puerto Rico while on a visit to the island.

== Works ==
Many of North's published works were short pamphlet-style writings and not full-length books:

- Lynching Negro children in southern courts (the Scottsboro case) (PDF). New York: International Labor Defense. 1931. LCCN 97129268.
- Proletarian Literature in the United States: An Anthology. (Contributor and co-editor.) New York: International Publishers, 1935.
- Why Spain can win. New York: Workers Library Publishers. 1939.
- Men in the ranks, the story of 12 Americans in Spain. New York: Friends of the Abraham Lincoln Brigade. 1939.
- The case of Earl Browder: why he should be freed. New York: Citizen's Committee to Free Earl Browder. 1942.
- Washington and Lincoln: The American tradition. New York: Workers Library Publishers. 1942.
- What are we doing in China?. New York: New Century Publishers. 1945.
- Verdict against freedom; your stake in the Communist trial. New York: New Century Publishers. 1949.
- Behind the Florida bombings; who killed NAACP leader Harry T. Moore and his wife?. New York: New Century Publishers. 1952.
- Robert Minor: Artist and Crusader. New York: International Publishers. 1956. ASIN B000YB9KMO.
- No Men Are Strangers. New York: International Publishers. 1958. ASIN B0007DREAY.
- Cuba's revolution: I saw the people's victory. New York: New Century Publishers. 1959.
- Cuba: Hope of a Hemisphere. New York: International Publishers. 1961. ASIN B0007EIYDE.
- New Masses: An Anthology of the Rebel Thirties. New York: International Publishers. 1969. ASIN B000MXQX5Q.
