= 1952 Socialist Labor National Convention =

- 1952 presidential election
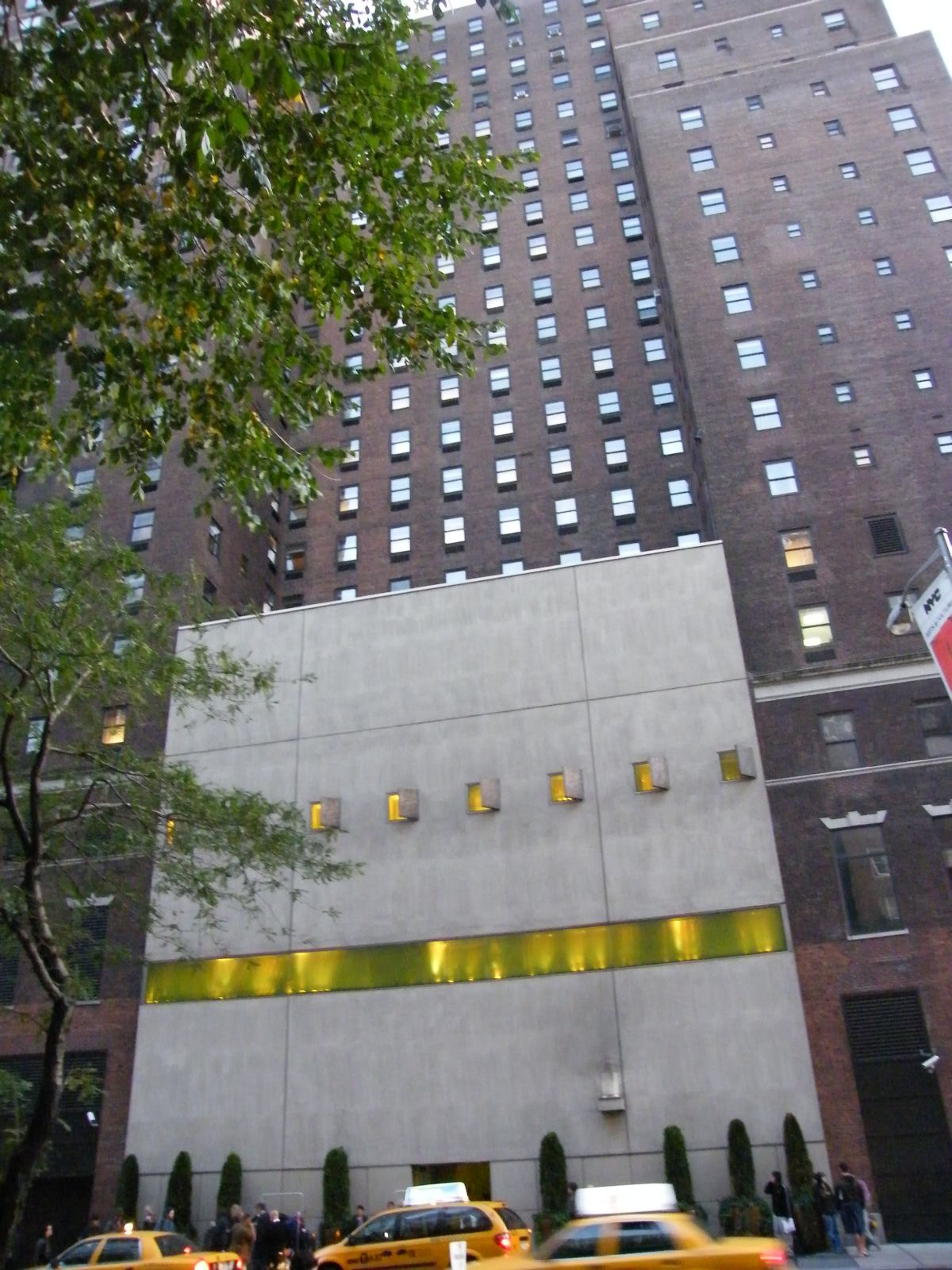
- The former Henry Hudson Hotel location of the convention

Convention
- Dates: May 3–5, 1952
- City: New York City, New York
- Venue: Henry Hudson Hotel

Candidates
- Presidential nominee: Eric Hass of New York
- Vice-presidential nominee: Stephen Emery of New York

1952 Socialist Labor National Convention saw the Socialist Labor Party of America nominate Eric Hass and Stephen Emery for president and vice president.

== Logistics ==
The convention was held May 3–5 at the Henry Hudson Hotel in New York City, and was presided over by Nat Karp.

== Nominations ==
Eric Hass, the editor of The Weekly People and a perennial candidate in New York, was nominated for president. Stephen Emery, a dispatcher for the New York City Subway, was nominated for vice president.

== Party leadership election ==
At the convention, Arnold Petersen was elected party secretary.

== Platform ==
The party adopted a platform included the declaration that the "downfall of the capitalist system is certain."
