= 1948 United States presidential election in Indiana =

- November 2, 1948
- Turnout: 67.2% ▼4.5 pp
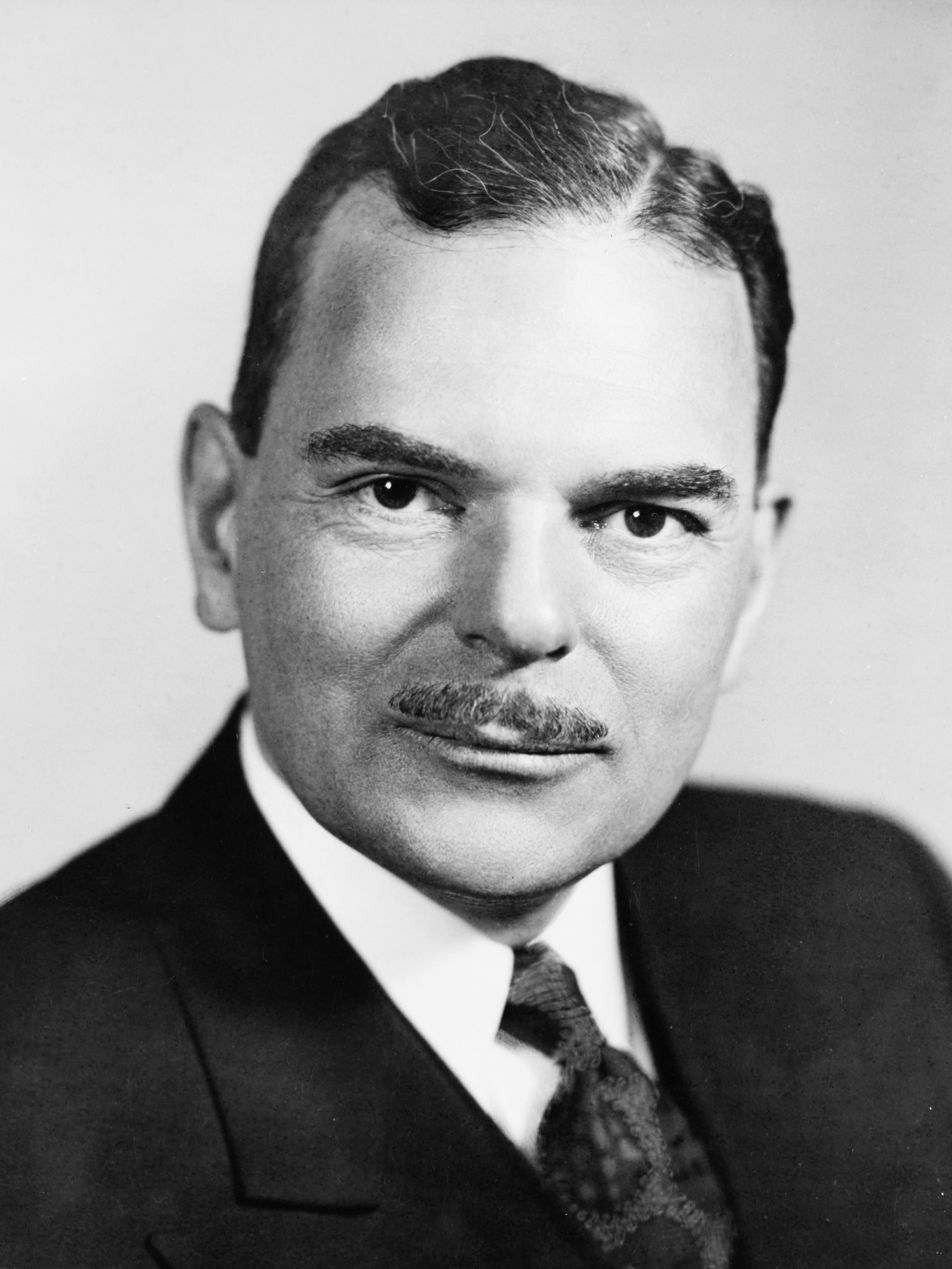

Nominee	Thomas E. Dewey	Harry S. Truman
Party	Republican	Democratic
Home state	New York	Missouri
Running mate	Earl Warren	Alben W. Barkley
Electoral vote	13	0
Popular vote	821,079	807,833
Percentage	49.58%	48.78%
County results
Dewey
40–50%
50–60%
60–70%
Truman
40–50%
50–60%
60–70%
President before election
Harry S. Truman
Democratic
Elected President
Harry S. Truman
Democratic

A presidential election was held in Indiana on November 2, 1948, as part of the 1948 United States presidential election. The Republican ticket of the governor of New York Thomas E. Dewey and the governor of California Earl Warren defeated the Democratic ticket of the incumbent president of the United States Harry S. Truman and the senior U.S. senator from Kentucky Alben W. Barkley. Truman defeated Dewey in the national election with 303 electoral votes.

== General election ==
=== Statistics ===
As of 2024 presidential election, this remains the most recent presidential election in which the Democratic ticket carried Johnson County, Indiana.

=== Results ===
1948 United States presidential election in Indiana
Party	Candidate	Votes	%	±%
Republican	Thomas E. Dewey Earl Warren	821,079	49.58	▼2.80
Democratic	Harry S. Truman Alben W. Barkley	807,833	48.78	▲2.05
Prohibition	Claude A. Watson Dale H. Learn	14,711	0.89	▼0.14
Progressive	Henry A. Wallace Glen H. Taylor	9,649	0.58	▲0.58
Socialist	Norman Thomas Tucker P. Smith	2,179	0.13	Steady
Socialist Labor	Edward A. Teichert Stephen Emery	763	0.05	▲0.05
Total votes		1,656,214	100.00	

=== Results by county ===
1948 United States presidential election in Indiana by county
County	Thomas E. Dewey Republican		Harry S. Truman Democratic		Claude A. Watson Prohibition		Henry A. Wallace Progressive		Others		Margin		Total
County	Votes	%	Votes	%	Votes	%	Votes	%	Votes	%	Votes	%	Total
Adams	4,832	50.10%	4,640	48.11%	143	1.48%	22	0.23%	8	0.08%	192	1.99%	9,645
Allen	37,494	54.00%	31,239	44.99%	224	0.32%	335	0.48%	144	0.21%	6,255	9.01%	69,436
Bartholomew	7,804	48.74%	7,960	49.71%	203	1.27%	29	0.18%	16	0.10%	-156	-0.97%	16,012
Benton	3,224	57.88%	2,317	41.60%	20	0.36%	6	0.11%	3	0.06%	907	16.28%	5,570
Blackford	2,840	42.76%	3,611	54.37%	152	2.29%	24	0.36%	14	0.21%	-771	-11.61%	6,641
Boone	6,450	55.67%	5,037	43.47%	71	0.61%	20	0.17%	8	0.07%	1,413	12.20%	11,586
Brown	1,092	41.54%	1,459	55.50%	50	1.90%	19	0.72%	9	0.35%	-367	-13.96%	2,629
Carroll	4,597	53.99%	3,845	45.16%	53	0.62%	17	0.20%	2	0.02%	752	8.83%	8,514
Cass	9,105	46.97%	10,086	52.03%	103	0.53%	68	0.35%	23	0.12%	-981	-5.06%	19,385
Clark	7,001	38.57%	10,953	60.34%	120	0.66%	39	0.21%	40	0.22%	-3,952	-21.77%	18,153
Clay	5,654	47.49%	5,965	50.10%	175	1.47%	90	0.76%	21	0.18%	-311	-2.61%	11,905
Clinton	7,762	52.02%	7,001	46.92%	114	0.76%	31	0.21%	13	0.09%	761	5.10%	14,921
Crawford	2,427	46.97%	2,625	50.80%	101	1.95%	9	0.17%	5	0.10%	-198	-3.83%	5,167
Daviess	7,030	53.89%	5,867	44.98%	85	0.65%	36	0.28%	26	0.20%	1,163	8.91%	13,044
Dearborn	5,353	46.70%	6,040	52.70%	49	0.43%	14	0.12%	6	0.05%	-687	-6.00%	11,462
Decatur	5,163	56.95%	3,808	42.00%	79	0.87%	11	0.12%	5	0.05%	1,355	14.95%	9,066
DeKalb	6,941	54.86%	5,439	42.99%	228	1.80%	36	0.28%	8	0.07%	1,502	11.87%	12,652
Delaware	15,662	46.72%	17,060	50.89%	617	1.84%	136	0.41%	50	0.15%	-1,398	-4.17%	33,525
Dubois	4,295	39.30%	6,564	60.07%	33	0.30%	26	0.24%	10	0.09%	-2,269	-20.77%	10,928
Elkhart	18,999	56.68%	13,703	40.88%	586	1.75%	160	0.48%	69	0.20%	5,296	15.80%	33,517
Fayette	5,399	47.62%	5,876	51.83%	41	0.36%	18	0.16%	4	0.04%	-477	-4.21%	11,338
Floyd	8,367	43.76%	10,593	55.40%	95	0.50%	53	0.28%	13	0.07%	-2,226	-11.64%	19,121
Fountain	5,186	54.76%	4,215	44.50%	43	0.45%	24	0.25%	3	0.03%	971	10.26%	9,471
Franklin	3,566	55.13%	2,860	44.22%	30	0.46%	11	0.17%	1	0.02%	706	10.91%	6,468
Fulton	4,930	58.70%	3,233	38.50%	202	2.41%	23	0.27%	10	0.12%	1,697	20.20%	8,398
Gibson	7,431	47.30%	7,988	50.85%	197	1.25%	64	0.41%	29	0.19%	-557	-3.55%	15,709
Grant	13,138	50.31%	12,212	46.76%	666	2.55%	70	0.27%	29	0.11%	926	3.55%	26,115
Greene	7,453	48.20%	7,709	49.85%	188	1.22%	85	0.55%	28	0.18%	-256	-1.65%	15,463
Hamilton	7,521	62.12%	4,384	36.21%	164	1.35%	31	0.26%	7	0.06%	3,137	25.91%	12,107
Hancock	4,721	48.05%	4,948	50.36%	134	1.36%	20	0.20%	3	0.03%	-227	-2.31%	9,826
Harrison	4,104	46.90%	4,465	51.02%	162	1.85%	14	0.16%	6	0.07%	-361	-4.12%	8,751
Hendricks	6,327	59.23%	4,280	40.07%	46	0.43%	20	0.19%	9	0.08%	2,047	19.16%	10,682
Henry	10,487	54.00%	8,523	43.89%	322	1.66%	52	0.27%	37	0.19%	1,964	10.11%	19,421
Howard	10,874	44.64%	12,937	53.10%	404	1.66%	119	0.49%	28	0.11%	-2,063	-8.46%	24,362
Huntington	8,178	52.01%	7,202	45.81%	266	1.69%	48	0.31%	29	0.19%	976	6.20%	15,723
Jackson	6,062	45.00%	7,258	53.88%	117	0.87%	31	0.23%	3	0.02%	-1,196	-8.88%	13,471
Jasper	4,320	65.42%	2,216	33.56%	19	0.29%	36	0.55%	12	0.19%	2,104	31.86%	6,603
Jay	5,635	49.25%	5,520	48.24%	245	2.14%	35	0.31%	7	0.06%	115	1.01%	11,442
Jefferson	5,166	53.79%	4,302	44.79%	102	1.06%	16	0.17%	18	0.19%	864	9.00%	9,604
Jennings	3,485	52.52%	3,084	46.47%	52	0.78%	11	0.17%	4	0.06%	401	6.05%	6,636
Johnson	6,151	49.39%	6,216	49.91%	45	0.36%	31	0.25%	9	0.07%	-65	-0.52%	12,454
Knox	9,250	43.67%	11,650	55.00%	153	0.72%	102	0.48%	27	0.12%	-2,400	-11.33%	21,182
Kosciusko	9,327	62.79%	5,102	34.35%	364	2.45%	42	0.28%	20	0.13%	4,225	28.44%	14,855
LaGrange	3,106	63.82%	1,628	33.45%	114	2.34%	11	0.23%	8	0.16%	1,478	30.37%	4,867
Lake	51,413	38.77%	77,025	58.09%	626	0.47%	3,073	2.32%	458	0.34%	-25,612	-19.32%	132,595
LaPorte	15,661	52.45%	13,923	46.63%	97	0.32%	137	0.46%	41	0.14%	1,738	5.82%	29,859
Lawrence	8,643	58.13%	6,131	41.23%	74	0.50%	16	0.11%	5	0.03%	2,512	16.90%	14,869
Madison	18,917	43.04%	24,439	55.61%	341	0.78%	205	0.47%	46	0.10%	-5,522	-12.57%	43,948
Marion	103,603	50.78%	97,915	47.99%	956	0.47%	1,184	0.58%	355	0.18%	5,688	2.79%	204,013
Marshall	7,873	56.97%	5,661	40.97%	210	1.52%	59	0.43%	16	0.12%	2,212	16.00%	13,819
Martin	2,230	43.96%	2,788	54.96%	40	0.79%	9	0.18%	6	0.12%	-558	-11.00%	5,073
Miami	7,083	51.09%	6,538	47.16%	184	1.33%	51	0.37%	7	0.05%	545	3.93%	13,863
Monroe	9,579	54.64%	7,375	42.07%	307	1.75%	177	1.01%	94	0.53%	2,204	12.57%	17,532
Montgomery	7,890	58.28%	5,492	40.57%	121	0.89%	20	0.15%	14	0.10%	2,398	17.71%	13,537
Morgan	5,677	55.13%	4,428	43.00%	147	1.43%	33	0.32%	12	0.12%	1,249	12.13%	10,297
Newton	3,312	68.36%	1,483	30.61%	17	0.35%	29	0.60%	4	0.08%	1,829	37.75%	4,845
Noble	6,503	57.33%	4,676	41.22%	128	1.13%	23	0.20%	14	0.12%	1,827	16.11%	11,344
Ohio	1,031	46.55%	1,173	52.96%	9	0.41%	2	0.09%	0	0.00%	-142	-6.41%	2,215
Orange	4,574	57.03%	3,359	41.88%	79	0.98%	7	0.09%	2	0.02%	1,215	15.15%	8,021
Owen	3,002	51.14%	2,738	46.64%	95	1.62%	28	0.48%	7	0.12%	264	4.50%	5,870
Parke	4,326	53.33%	3,681	45.38%	41	0.51%	54	0.67%	10	0.13%	645	7.95%	8,112
Perry	3,761	45.02%	4,569	54.69%	12	0.14%	9	0.11%	3	0.04%	-808	-9.67%	8,354
Pike	3,696	49.60%	3,596	48.26%	116	1.56%	33	0.44%	11	0.15%	100	1.34%	7,452
Porter	8,907	62.21%	5,161	36.05%	52	0.36%	115	0.80%	83	0.58%	3,746	26.16%	14,318
Posey	3,879	44.43%	4,729	54.16%	95	1.09%	12	0.14%	14	0.16%	-850	-9.73%	8,731
Pulaski	3,039	50.72%	2,736	45.66%	185	3.09%	22	0.37%	10	0.16%	303	5.06%	5,992
Putnam	5,072	50.91%	4,814	48.32%	40	0.40%	23	0.23%	14	0.14%	258	2.59%	9,963
Randolph	7,122	57.96%	4,655	37.89%	456	3.71%	34	0.28%	20	0.16%	2,467	20.07%	12,287
Ripley	5,313	53.34%	4,574	45.92%	57	0.57%	13	0.13%	4	0.04%	739	7.42%	9,961
Rush	5,362	57.53%	3,814	40.92%	127	1.36%	14	0.15%	4	0.04%	1,548	16.61%	9,321
St. Joseph	39,593	43.58%	49,866	54.89%	367	0.40%	783	0.86%	237	0.26%	-10,273	-11.31%	90,846
Scott	2,429	43.11%	3,128	55.51%	57	1.01%	17	0.30%	4	0.07%	-699	-12.40%	5,635
Shelby	6,068	45.54%	6,992	52.48%	235	1.76%	23	0.17%	6	0.05%	-924	-6.94%	13,324
Spencer	4,496	51.52%	4,163	47.71%	56	0.64%	4	0.05%	7	0.08%	333	3.81%	8,726
Starke	3,518	50.55%	3,312	47.59%	34	0.49%	82	1.18%	14	0.20%	206	2.96%	6,960
Steuben	4,341	67.28%	1,996	30.94%	78	1.21%	27	0.42%	10	0.15%	2,345	36.34%	6,452
Sullivan	4,824	40.88%	6,705	56.82%	100	0.85%	141	1.19%	31	0.26%	-1,881	-15.94%	11,801
Switzerland	1,839	43.30%	2,375	55.92%	28	0.66%	5	0.12%	0	0.00%	-536	-12.62%	4,247
Tippecanoe	17,034	60.60%	10,825	38.51%	66	0.23%	106	0.38%	76	0.27%	6,209	22.09%	28,107
Tipton	4,169	50.78%	3,925	47.81%	84	1.02%	20	0.24%	12	0.14%	244	2.97%	8,210
Union	1,859	63.25%	1,049	35.69%	26	0.88%	3	0.10%	2	0.07%	810	27.56%	2,939
Vanderburgh	27,584	45.25%	32,640	53.55%	391	0.64%	190	0.31%	151	0.25%	-5,056	-8.30%	60,956
Vermillion	4,685	45.03%	5,426	52.15%	61	0.59%	198	1.90%	34	0.32%	-741	-7.12%	10,404
Vigo	19,049	41.81%	25,906	56.86%	192	0.42%	298	0.65%	119	0.26%	-6,857	-15.05%	45,564
Wabash	8,149	61.53%	4,692	35.42%	288	2.17%	77	0.58%	39	0.29%	3,457	26.11%	13,245
Warren	2,444	63.17%	1,391	35.95%	27	0.70%	6	0.16%	1	0.03%	1,053	27.22%	3,869
Warrick	4,602	48.75%	4,750	50.32%	46	0.49%	28	0.30%	14	0.15%	-148	-1.57%	9,440
Washington	3,660	47.18%	4,033	51.99%	46	0.59%	16	0.21%	2	0.03%	-373	-4.81%	7,757
Wayne	15,445	57.81%	10,749	40.23%	358	1.34%	86	0.32%	78	0.29%	4,696	17.58%	26,716
Wells	4,288	47.15%	4,726	51.97%	52	0.57%	20	0.22%	8	0.09%	-438	-4.82%	9,094
White	4,911	55.72%	3,849	43.67%	38	0.43%	10	0.11%	5	0.06%	1,062	12.05%	8,813
Whitley	4,715	51.88%	4,240	46.65%	92	1.01%	32	0.35%	10	0.11%	475	5.23%	9,089
TOTAL	821,079	49.58%	807,833	48.78%	14,711	0.89%	9,649	0.58%	2,942	0.18%	13,246	0.80%	1,656,214

==== Counties that flipped from Republican to Democratic ====
- Bartholomew
- Cass
- Clay
- Crawford
- Dearborn
- Fayette
- Gibson
- Greene
- Hancock
- Harrison
- Howard
- Jackson
- Johnson
- Ohio
- Perry
- Posey
- Shelby
- Vermillion
- Warrick
- Washington
- Wells

== See also ==
- United States presidential elections in Indiana

== Bibliography ==
- Indiana (1948). Year Book of the State of Indiana for the Year 1948. [Indianapolis]: Division of Accounting and Statistics.
- Madison, James H. (1986). The Indiana Way: A State History. Bloomington: Indiana University Press.
- Petersen, Svend (1963). A Statistical History of the American Presidential Elections. New York: Frederick Ungar Publishing Company. LCCN 62-21786.
- Sullivan, Robert David (June 29, 2016). "How the Red and Blue Map Evolved over the Past Century". America.
