= 1948 United States presidential election in Wisconsin =

- November 2, 1948

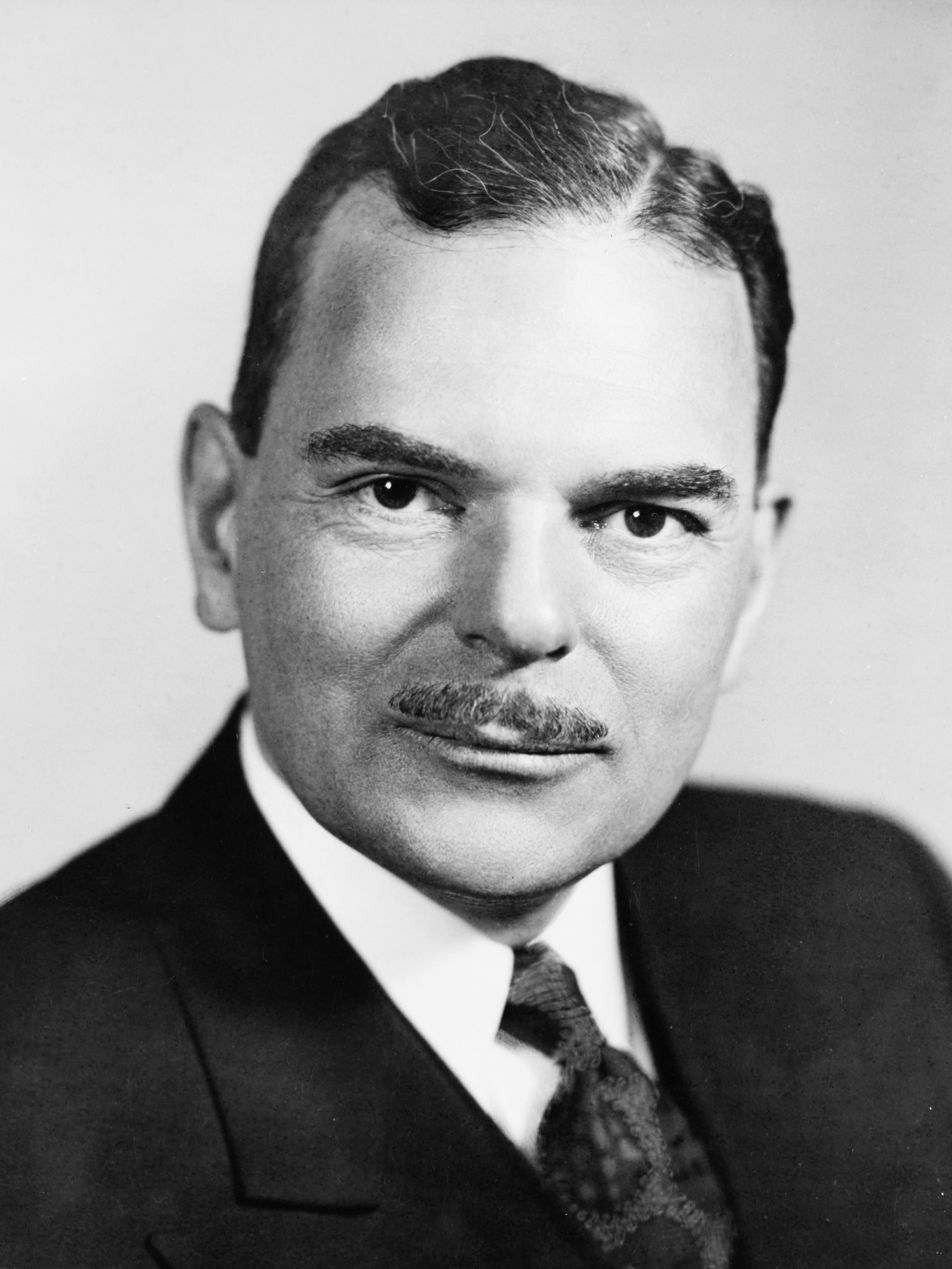
Nominee	Harry S. Truman	Thomas E. Dewey
Party	Democratic	Republican
Home state	Missouri	New York
Running mate	Alben W. Barkley	Earl Warren
Electoral vote	12	0
Popular vote	647,310	590,959
Percentage	50.70%	46.28%
County results
Truman
40–50%
50–60%
60–70%
Dewey
40–50%
50–60%
60–70%
President before election
Harry S. Truman
Democratic
Elected President
Harry S. Truman
Democratic

The 1948 United States presidential election in Wisconsin was held on November 2, 1948, as part of the 1948 United States presidential election. State voters chose 12 electors to the Electoral College, who voted for president and vice president.

Politics in Wisconsin since the Populist movement had been dominated by the Republican Party. The Democratic Party became uncompetitive outside certain eastern German areas as the upper classes, along with the majority of workers who followed them, fled from William Jennings Bryan’s agrarian and free silver sympathies. Although the state did develop a strong Social-Democratic Party to provide opposition to the GOP, Wisconsin developed the direct Republican primary in 1903 and this ultimately created competition between the “League” under Robert M. La Follette, and the conservative “Regular” faction. This ultimately would develop into the Wisconsin Progressive Party in the late 1930s, which was opposed to the conservative German Democrats and to the national Republican Party, and allied with Franklin D. Roosevelt at the federal level.

During the two wartime elections, the formerly Democratic German counties in the east of the state – which had been powerfully opposed to the Civil War because they saw it as a “Yankee” war and opposed the military draft instituted during it – viewed Communism as a much greater threat to America than Nazism and consequently opposed President Roosevelt's war effort. Consequently, these historically Democratic counties became virtually the most Republican in the entire state, and the two wartime elections were very close after Roosevelt had in 1932 and 1936, aided by the support of Robert M. La Follette Jr., carried Wisconsin by more than two-to-one.

As the Progressive Party disintegrated and its members returned to the GOP, that party regained its hegemony in the state legislature and Congressional representation, so that by 1946 Wisconsin had an entirely Republican Congressional delegation for the first time since the 71st Congress, and the Democrats’ representation in the state legislature fell as low as it had been since that same point.

Although the state's Republican presidential primary went to Harold E. Stassen of neighboring Minnesota, the earliest polls had second-time nominee Thomas E. Dewey well ahead of incumbent Harry S. Truman. A final poll on the first day of November had Dewey leading by 56 percent to 41 percent, with “People’s Progressive” nominee and former Vice-president Henry A. Wallace on three percent.

Nonetheless, as he achieved elsewhere in the Midwest, Truman made a major comeback to claim Wisconsin by a larger margin than Roosevelt had done in 1940. His victory was attributed to the fact that Dewey, compared to 1944, soft-pedalled the issue of communism, to the fact that a large number of isolationist voters who had been responsible for the dramatic Republican presidential gains earlier in the decade stayed home, and to fear of loss of New Deal farm programs if Dewey were elected. Henry Wallace's candidacy, of which much had been expected due to the state's isolationism, disappointed, receiving only 1.98 percent of the vote mostly from historically progressive Scandinavian-Americans, further helping Truman.

== Results ==
1948 United States presidential election in Wisconsin
Party	Candidate	Votes	Percentage	Electoral votes
Democratic	Harry S. Truman (incumbent)	647,310	50.70%	12
Republican	Thomas E. Dewey	590,959	46.28%	0
People's Progressive	Henry A. Wallace	25,282	1.98%	0
Social-Democratic	Norman Thomas	12,547	0.98%	0
Independent Socialist Labor	Edward A. Teichert	399	0.03%	0
Independent Socialist Workers	Farrell Dobbs	303	0.02%	0
Totals		1,276,800	100.00%	12

=== Results by county ===
County	Harry S. Truman Democratic		Thomas E. Dewey Republican		Henry A. Wallace Progressive		Norman Thomas Social-Democratic		Other candidates Various parties		Margin		Total votes cast
County	#	%	#	%	#	%	#	%	#	%	#	%	Total votes cast
Adams	1,419	51.39%	1,259	45.60%	70	2.54%	10	0.36%	3	0.11%	160	5.80%	2,761
Ashland	4,110	54.73%	3,135	41.75%	234	3.12%	28	0.37%	2	0.03%	975	12.98%	7,509
Barron	6,148	51.17%	5,516	45.91%	286	2.38%	66	0.55%	0	0.00%	632	5.26%	12,016
Bayfield	3,081	52.80%	2,338	40.07%	392	6.72%	24	0.41%	0	0.00%	743	12.73%	5,835
Brown	18,449	50.47%	17,729	48.50%	243	0.66%	121	0.33%	16	0.04%	720	1.97%	36,558
Buffalo	2,563	51.33%	2,350	47.07%	48	0.96%	31	0.62%	1	0.02%	213	4.27%	4,993
Burnett	2,177	55.83%	1,590	40.78%	120	3.08%	8	0.21%	4	0.10%	587	15.06%	3,899
Calumet	2,662	38.53%	4,185	60.57%	32	0.46%	27	0.39%	3	0.04%	-1,523	-22.04%	6,909
Chippewa	7,702	54.62%	6,146	43.58%	210	1.49%	41	0.29%	3	0.02%	1,556	11.03%	14,102
Clark	4,840	43.31%	5,885	52.66%	382	3.42%	64	0.57%	4	0.04%	-1,045	-9.35%	11,175
Columbia	5,615	46.14%	6,406	52.64%	104	0.85%	42	0.35%	2	0.02%	-791	-6.50%	12,169
Crawford	3,639	50.65%	3,465	48.23%	55	0.77%	18	0.25%	8	0.11%	174	2.42%	7,185
Dane	35,486	58.50%	22,934	37.80%	1,341	2.21%	870	1.43%	33	0.05%	12,552	20.69%	60,664
Dodge	8,212	43.59%	10,381	55.11%	160	0.85%	78	0.41%	7	0.04%	-2,169	-11.51%	18,838
Door	2,440	32.71%	4,911	65.84%	90	1.21%	18	0.24%	0	0.00%	-2,471	-33.13%	7,459
Douglas	12,278	63.79%	6,252	32.48%	620	3.22%	94	0.49%	4	0.02%	6,026	31.31%	19,248
Dunn	4,894	52.16%	4,319	46.03%	131	1.40%	33	0.35%	5	0.05%	575	6.13%	9,382
Eau Claire	9,971	55.27%	7,825	43.37%	178	0.99%	67	0.37%	1	0.01%	2,146	11.89%	18,042
Florence	885	50.34%	756	43.00%	107	6.09%	9	0.51%	1	0.06%	129	7.34%	1,758
Fond du Lac	8,904	38.57%	13,760	59.61%	283	1.23%	126	0.55%	10	0.04%	-4,856	-21.04%	23,083
Forest	2,208	61.97%	1,251	35.11%	89	2.50%	10	0.28%	5	0.14%	957	26.86%	3,563
Grant	6,575	43.57%	8,299	55.00%	125	0.83%	87	0.58%	3	0.02%	-1,724	-11.43%	15,089
Green	3,881	46.21%	4,403	52.43%	68	0.81%	45	0.54%	1	0.01%	-522	-6.22%	8,398
Green Lake	1,722	30.06%	3,939	68.76%	50	0.87%	17	0.30%	1	0.02%	-2,217	-38.70%	5,729
Iowa	3,917	50.26%	3,745	48.05%	100	1.28%	31	0.40%	1	0.01%	172	2.21%	7,794
Iron	2,665	63.32%	1,281	30.43%	240	5.70%	21	0.50%	2	0.05%	1,384	32.88%	4,209
Jackson	2,921	52.51%	2,553	45.89%	63	1.13%	25	0.45%	1	0.02%	368	6.62%	5,563
Jefferson	7,256	46.13%	8,244	52.42%	151	0.96%	75	0.48%	2	0.01%	-988	-6.28%	15,728
Juneau	2,889	42.43%	3,793	55.71%	99	1.45%	28	0.41%	0	0.00%	-904	-13.28%	6,809
Kenosha	17,987	56.02%	12,780	39.80%	1,046	3.26%	281	0.88%	15	0.05%	5,207	16.22%	32,109
Kewaunee	2,746	42.39%	3,646	56.28%	64	0.99%	15	0.23%	7	0.11%	-900	-13.89%	6,478
La Crosse	12,345	53.07%	10,525	45.25%	299	1.29%	86	0.37%	5	0.02%	1,820	7.82%	23,260
Lafayette	3,740	52.65%	3,288	46.28%	55	0.77%	19	0.27%	2	0.03%	452	6.36%	7,104
Langlade	4,346	53.78%	3,441	42.58%	275	3.40%	18	0.22%	1	0.01%	905	11.20%	8,081
Lincoln	3,368	42.67%	4,339	54.97%	140	1.77%	37	0.47%	10	0.13%	-971	-12.30%	7,894
Manitowoc	13,401	53.90%	10,947	44.03%	355	1.43%	150	0.60%	10	0.04%	2,454	9.87%	24,863
Marathon	15,898	56.62%	11,494	40.93%	368	1.31%	310	1.10%	9	0.03%	4,404	15.68%	28,079
Marinette	6,468	51.48%	5,869	46.71%	169	1.35%	56	0.45%	3	0.02%	599	4.77%	12,565
Marquette	1,095	34.59%	2,033	64.21%	24	0.76%	14	0.44%	0	0.00%	-938	-29.63%	3,166
Milwaukee	187,637	54.72%	138,672	40.44%	9,718	2.83%	6,521	1.90%	362	0.11%	48,965	14.28%	342,910
Monroe	4,970	47.38%	5,347	50.97%	113	1.08%	59	0.56%	1	0.01%	-377	-3.59%	10,490
Oconto	4,269	46.17%	4,865	52.61%	68	0.74%	44	0.48%	1	0.01%	-596	-6.45%	9,247
Oneida	4,081	50.92%	3,729	46.53%	151	1.88%	46	0.57%	8	0.10%	352	4.39%	8,015
Outagamie	11,233	40.59%	16,161	58.40%	151	0.55%	119	0.43%	8	0.03%	-4,928	-17.81%	27,672
Ozaukee	4,159	45.17%	4,866	52.85%	123	1.34%	59	0.64%	1	0.01%	-707	-7.68%	9,208
Pepin	1,381	49.96%	1,333	48.23%	36	1.30%	14	0.51%	0	0.00%	48	1.74%	2,764
Pierce	4,395	52.91%	3,753	45.18%	121	1.46%	36	0.43%	1	0.01%	642	7.73%	8,306
Polk	5,330	55.68%	3,974	41.52%	216	2.26%	50	0.52%	2	0.02%	1,356	14.17%	9,572
Portage	8,154	59.13%	5,424	39.33%	134	0.97%	71	0.51%	8	0.06%	2,730	19.80%	13,791
Price	3,373	49.71%	2,952	43.51%	415	6.12%	41	0.60%	4	0.06%	421	6.20%	6,785
Racine	23,266	53.12%	19,029	43.45%	1,165	2.66%	329	0.75%	8	0.02%	4,237	9.67%	43,797
Richland	2,990	43.30%	3,836	55.55%	60	0.87%	17	0.25%	3	0.04%	-846	-12.25%	6,906
Rock	16,150	47.93%	17,068	50.66%	297	0.88%	167	0.50%	10	0.03%	-918	-2.72%	33,692
Rusk	3,401	54.51%	2,623	42.04%	187	3.00%	26	0.42%	2	0.03%	778	12.47%	6,239
Sauk	5,831	43.82%	7,140	53.66%	130	0.98%	197	1.48%	9	0.07%	-1,309	-9.84%	13,307
Sawyer	2,177	47.75%	2,257	49.51%	100	2.19%	25	0.55%	0	0.00%	-80	-1.75%	4,559
Shawano	4,192	39.33%	6,286	58.97%	136	1.28%	45	0.42%	0	0.00%	-2,094	-19.65%	10,659
Sheboygan	15,339	53.00%	12,459	43.05%	692	2.39%	431	1.49%	21	0.07%	2,880	9.95%	28,942
St. Croix	6,173	57.69%	4,326	40.43%	154	1.44%	48	0.45%	0	0.00%	1,847	17.26%	10,701
Taylor	3,184	51.99%	2,579	42.11%	200	3.27%	159	2.60%	2	0.03%	605	9.88%	6,124
Trempealeau	4,711	55.67%	3,650	43.13%	74	0.87%	23	0.27%	5	0.06%	1,061	12.54%	8,463
Vernon	5,226	55.18%	4,139	43.71%	75	0.79%	24	0.25%	6	0.06%	1,087	11.48%	9,470
Vilas	1,688	36.93%	2,665	58.30%	169	3.70%	39	0.85%	10	0.22%	-977	-21.37%	4,571
Walworth	5,377	33.29%	10,509	65.07%	170	1.05%	94	0.58%	1	0.01%	-5,132	-31.78%	16,151
Washburn	2,708	54.98%	2,059	41.81%	131	2.66%	23	0.47%	4	0.08%	649	13.18%	4,925
Washington	4,495	38.87%	6,876	59.46%	127	1.10%	64	0.55%	3	0.03%	-2,381	-20.59%	11,565
Waukesha	13,952	43.67%	17,324	54.22%	400	1.25%	260	0.81%	14	0.04%	-3,372	-10.55%	31,950
Waupaca	4,020	30.97%	8,764	67.51%	132	1.02%	64	0.49%	2	0.02%	-4,744	-36.54%	12,982
Waushara	1,430	27.69%	3,594	69.60%	110	2.13%	28	0.54%	2	0.04%	-2,164	-41.91%	5,164
Winnebago	13,116	42.16%	17,165	55.18%	536	1.72%	278	0.89%	15	0.05%	-4,049	-13.02%	31,110
Wood	7,999	49.23%	8,073	49.69%	125	0.77%	46	0.28%	4	0.02%	-74	-0.46%	16,247
Totals	647,310	50.70%	590,959	46.28%	25,282	1.98%	12,547	0.98%	702	0.05%	56,351	4.41%	1,276,800

==== Counties that flipped from Republican to Democratic ====
- Adams
- Barron
- Brown
- Buffalo
- Burnett
- Chippewa
- Crawford
- Dunn
- Eau Claire
- Iowa
- Jackson
- La Crosse
- Lafayette
- Manitowoc
- Marathon
- Marinette
- Pepin
- Pierce
- Polk
- Sheboygan
- St. Croix
- Trempealeau
- Vernon
- Washburn

==== Counties that flipped from Democratic to Republican ====
- Vilas

=== Electors ===
These were the names of the electors on each ticket.

Harry S. Truman & Alben W. Barkley Democratic Party	Thomas E. Dewey & Earl Warren Republican Party	Henry A. Wallace & Glen H. Taylor Progressive Party	Norman Thomas & Tucker P. Smith Social-Democratic Party	Edward A. Teichert & Stephen Emery Socialist Labor Party	Farrell Dobbs & Grace Carlson Socialist Workers Party
Carl W. Thompson; Anthony P. Gawronski; Elmer Beck; Charles W. Henney; William D. Carroll; John Mierzejewski; Thomas E. Fairchild; Arthur H. Gruenewald; Clayton Crooks; William C. Sullivan; Arthur L. Henning; George F. Meyer	Harvey V. Higley; Walter J. Kohler Jr.; Edward F. Hilker; Frank E. Panzer; Donald C. McDowell; Roy R. Stauff; Joseph F. Heil; George Greeley; Julius Spearbraker; Lloyd R. Watson; Norris J. Kellman; Folke Becker	Alex Y. Wallace; Lawrence Grab; Cecile Lund; Alex J. McCulloch; Mary P. Samb; Edmund V. Bobrowicz; M. Michael Essin; Harold H. Priebe; Emil Muelver; Oliver J. Rasmussen; Linton Jahr; Henry J. Berquist	Frank P. Zeidler; Ruth Hart; William Cote; Lea Heine; Ethel Dahir; Allen Wilson; Stanley Budny; William J. Kirst; Clarence Mielke; Fred Kesting; Nina Mae Gold; Robert Suter	Frank Brlas Jr.; Artemio Cozzini; Marko Golubich; Matthew Karlovich; Samuel Munek; Louis Myler; Rudolph Prosen; Phillip Purdoff; Sebastian Rack; Ferdinand Schnarsky; Walter Semrau; Amos Wagner	Earl M. Boulton; Helen G. Boulton; James E. Boulton; Lily B. Boulton; Shirley Conell; Robert E. Durkin; George W. Golubeff; Roman Hermann; Lula R. Johnson; Loretta M. Kranski; Francis X. Shepherd; Raymond C. Shepherd

== See also ==
- United States presidential elections in Wisconsin
