= 1952 United States presidential election in Connecticut =

- November 4, 1952
- Turnout: 93.11%

Nominee	Dwight D. Eisenhower	Adlai Stevenson
Party	Republican	Democratic
Home state	New York	Illinois
Running mate	Richard Nixon	John Sparkman
Electoral vote	8	0
Popular vote	611,012	481,649
Percentage	55.70%	43.91%

Eisenhower
40–50%
50–60%
60–70%
70–80%
80–90%
90–100%
Stevenson
50–60%
60–70%
Tie
40–50%
President before election
Harry S. Truman
Democratic
Elected President
Dwight D. Eisenhower
Republican

The 1952 United States presidential election in Connecticut took place on November 4, 1952, as part of the 1952 United States presidential election which was held throughout all contemporary 48 states. Voters chose eight representatives, or electors to the Electoral College, who voted for president and vice president.

Connecticut voted for the Republican nominee, General Dwight D. Eisenhower of New York, over the Democratic nominee, former Governor Adlai Stevenson of Illinois. Eisenhower ran with Senator Richard Nixon of California, while Stevenson's running mate was Senator John Sparkman of Alabama.

Eisenhower won Connecticut by a margin of 11.79%.

== Results ==
1952 United States presidential election in Connecticut
Party	Candidate	Running mate	Popular vote		Electoral vote	
Party	Candidate	Running mate	Count	%	Count	%
Republican	Dwight David Eisenhower of New York	Richard Nixon of California	611,012	55.70%	8	100.00%
Democratic	Adlai Stevenson II of Illinois	John Jackson Sparkman of Alabama	481,649	43.91%	0	0.00%
Socialist	Darlington Hoopes of Pennsylvania	Samuel H. Friedman of New York	2,244	0.20%	0	0.00%
Progressive	Vincent Hallinan of California	Charlotta Amanda Bass of New York	1,466	0.13%	0	0.00%
Socialist Labor	Eric Hass of New York	Stephen Emery of New York	535	0.04%	0	0.00%
N/A	Others	Others	5	0.01%	0	0.00%
Total			1,096,911	100.00%	8	100.00%

=== By county ===
County	Dwight D. Eisenhower Republican		Adlai Stevenson Democratic		Various candidates Other parties		Margin		Total votes cast
County	#	%	#	%	#	%	#	%	Total votes cast
Fairfield	167,278	60.72%	106,403	38.62%	1,812	0.66%	60,875	22.10%	275,493
Hartford	150,332	50.50%	146,551	49.23%	831	0.27%	3,781	1.27%	297,714
Litchfield	35,735	63.81%	20,163	36.00%	107	0.19%	15,572	27.81%	56,005
Middlesex	22,157	58.38%	15,722	41.43%	73	0.19%	6,435	16.95%	37,952
New Haven	165,917	54.66%	136,476	44.96%	1,148	0.38%	29,441	9.70%	303,541
New London	38,148	54.76%	31,374	45.03%	148	0.21%	6,774	9.73%	69,670
Tolland	13,466	58.69%	9,425	41.08%	52	0.23%	4,041	17.61%	22,943
Windham	17,979	53.53%	15,535	46.25%	74	0.22%	2,444	7.28%	33,588
Totals	611,012	55.70%	481,649	43.91%	4,250	0.39%	129,363	11.79%	1,096,911

==== Counties that flipped from Democratic to Republican ====
- New Haven
- New London
- Hartford
- Windham

== See also ==
- United States presidential elections in Connecticut
