= Georgia Cozzini =

American politician (1915–1983)

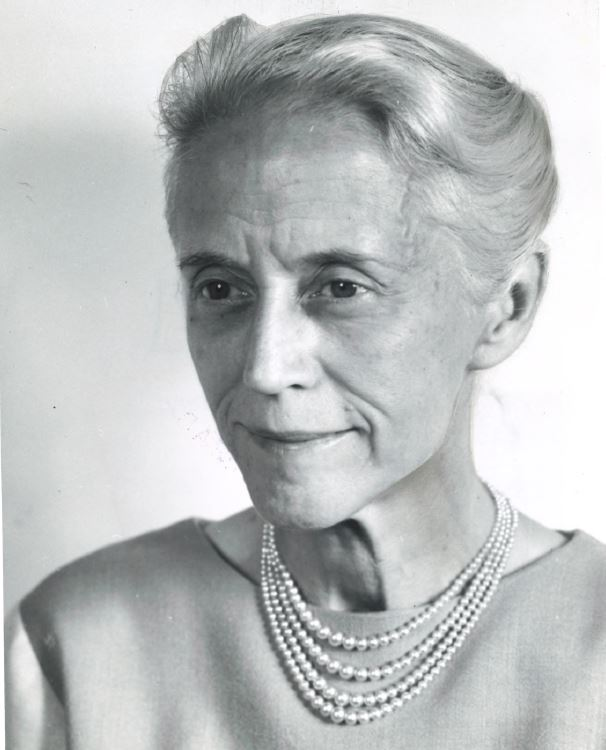
- Cozzini's headshot for her 1974 gubernatorial candidacy
- Born: Georgia Olive Purvis; February 14, 1915; Springfield, Missouri, U.S.
- Died: October 10, 1983 (aged 68)
- Occupation: Politician
- Known for: First woman to run for governor of Wisconsin
- Political party: Socialist Labor
- Spouse: Artemio Cozzini (m. 1936)
- Children: 2

Georgia Olive Cozzini (February 14, 1915 – October 10, 1983) was an American socialist politician. She is best remembered as the first woman to run for Governor of Wisconsin and for two consecutive runs as the vice presidential candidate of the Socialist Labor Party of America, appearing on the ballot in 1956 and 1960.

== Biography ==
=== Early years ===
Georgia Cozzini was born Georgia Olive Purvis on February 14, 1915, in Springfield, Missouri.

She married Artemio Cozzini, also a party member, a knife-grinder by trade, in 1936. The pair then settled in Artemio's hometown of Milwaukee, Wisconsin. The couple had two children, Bruce (born 1936) and Gina (born 1945).

=== Political career ===
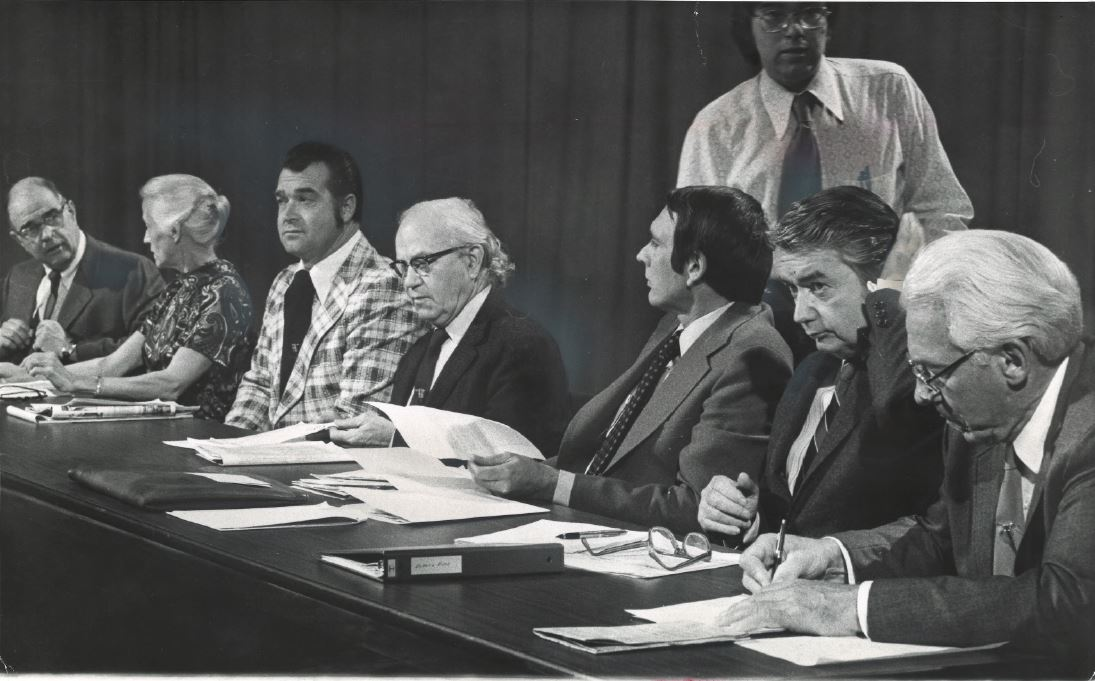
1974 Wisconsin gubernatorial candidates in an official debate

Cozzini was an active member of the Socialist Labor Party (SLP). She was the first woman to run for Governor of Wisconsin, heading the state SLP ticket in 1942. She ran for this office again in 1944, 1948, 1970 and 1974.

Cozzini ran for the United States Senate in Wisconsin, appearing as part of the SLP slate in 1946, 1957, 1958, and 1962.

Cozzini was twice the nominee of the SLP for Vice President of the United States, running in 1956 and 1960 on the ticket with Eric Hass, editor of the SLP's national newspaper, The Weekly People.

=== Death and legacy ===
Georgia Cozzini died on October 10, 1983. As requested, members of her family spread her ashes on the Northern Wisconsin Lake, where the family had spent many summers vacationing.

Preceded by Stephen Emery	Socialist Labor Party vice presidential candidate 1956 (lost), 1960 (lost)	Succeeded by Henning A. Blomen
