= 1952 United States presidential election in Pennsylvania =

- November 4, 1952

Nominee	Dwight D. Eisenhower	Adlai Stevenson
Party	Republican	Democratic
Home state	New York	Illinois
Running mate	Richard Nixon	John Sparkman
Electoral vote	32	0
Popular vote	2,415,789	2,146,269
Percentage	52.74%	46.85%
County results
Eisenhower
50–60%
60–70%
70–80%
80–90%
Stevenson
50–60%
60–70%
President before election
Harry S. Truman
Democratic
Elected President
Dwight D. Eisenhower
Republican

The 1952 United States presidential election in Pennsylvania took place on November 4, 1952, as part of the 1952 United States presidential election. Voters chose 32 representatives, or electors to the Electoral College, who voted for president and vice president.

Pennsylvania voted for the Republican nominee, war hero General Dwight D. Eisenhower, over the Democratic nominee, Illinois Governor Adlai Stevenson. Eisenhower won Pennsylvania by a margin of 5.89%.

Despite Thomas Dewey's relatively strong showing in Philadelphia County in 1948, Eisenhower became the first Republican ever to win the White House without carrying Allegheny or Philadelphia Counties, which had been Republican strongholds prior to the New Deal.

This was the first election since 1868 in which Pennsylvania voted more Democratic than the nation. It would continue to do so in every election thereafter until 2016.

== Results ==
1952 United States presidential election in Pennsylvania
Party	Candidate	Votes	Percentage	Electoral votes
Republican	Dwight D. Eisenhower	2,415,789	52.74%	32
Democratic	Adlai Stevenson	2,146,269	46.85%	0
Prohibition	Stuart Hamblen	8,951	0.20%	0
Progressive	Vincent Hallinan	4,222	0.09%	0
Socialist	Darlington Hoopes	2,698	0.06%	0
Militant Workers	Farrell Dobbs	1,508	0.03%	0
Industrial Government	Eric Hass	1,377	0.03%	0
Write-ins	Write-ins	155	0.00%	0

=== Results by county ===
County	Dwight D. Eisenhower Republican		Adlai Stevenson Democratic		Various candidates Other parties		Margin		Total votes cast
County	#	%	#	%	#	%	#	%	Total votes cast
Adams	11,016	65.82%	5,691	34.00%	30	0.18%	5,325	31.82%	16,737
Allegheny	359,224	49.00%	370,945	50.60%	2,903	0.40%	-11,721	-1.60%	733,072
Armstrong	16,955	55.90%	13,221	43.59%	153	0.50%	3,734	12.31%	30,329
Beaver	31,700	45.18%	38,136	54.35%	334	0.48%	-6,436	-9.17%	70,170
Bedford	9,419	63.93%	5,255	35.67%	60	0.41%	4,164	28.26%	14,734
Berks	51,720	52.42%	45,874	46.49%	1,074	1.09%	5,846	5.93%	98,668
Blair	32,113	65.44%	16,851	34.34%	106	0.22%	15,262	31.10%	49,070
Bradford	15,894	76.02%	4,959	23.72%	55	0.26%	10,935	52.30%	20,908
Bucks	40,753	62.38%	24,301	37.20%	275	0.42%	16,452	25.18%	65,329
Butler	25,243	61.99%	15,295	37.56%	185	0.45%	9,948	24.43%	40,723
Cambria	39,294	43.54%	50,774	56.26%	182	0.20%	-11,480	-12.72%	90,250
Cameron	2,307	69.05%	1,020	30.53%	14	0.42%	1,287	38.52%	3,341
Carbon	12,283	53.43%	10,571	45.98%	134	0.58%	1,712	7.45%	22,988
Centre	14,700	66.31%	7,391	33.34%	77	0.35%	7,309	32.97%	22,168
Chester	39,961	64.86%	21,490	34.88%	164	0.27%	18,471	29.98%	61,615
Clarion	9,340	63.76%	5,212	35.58%	97	0.66%	4,128	28.18%	14,649
Clearfield	16,045	54.25%	13,376	45.22%	156	0.53%	2,669	9.03%	29,577
Clinton	8,125	58.29%	5,758	41.31%	55	0.39%	2,367	16.98%	13,938
Columbia	13,008	57.67%	9,467	41.97%	79	0.35%	3,541	15.70%	22,554
Crawford	19,079	65.49%	9,874	33.89%	181	0.62%	9,205	31.60%	29,134
Cumberland	26,302	67.17%	12,762	32.59%	91	0.23%	13,540	34.58%	39,155
Dauphin	58,385	65.12%	30,985	34.56%	286	0.32%	27,400	30.56%	89,656
Delaware	129,743	61.56%	80,316	38.11%	689	0.33%	49,427	23.45%	210,748
Elk	7,702	54.26%	6,448	45.42%	45	0.32%	1,254	8.84%	14,195
Erie	48,836	56.89%	36,619	42.66%	391	0.46%	12,217	14.23%	85,846
Fayette	27,348	38.12%	43,921	61.22%	476	0.66%	-16,573	-23.10%	71,745
Forest	1,511	69.92%	627	29.01%	23	1.06%	884	40.91%	2,161
Franklin	16,474	64.82%	8,868	34.89%	74	0.29%	7,606	29.93%	25,416
Fulton	2,127	55.12%	1,718	44.52%	14	0.36%	409	10.60%	3,859
Greene	6,964	40.68%	10,125	59.14%	30	0.18%	-3,161	-18.46%	17,119
Huntingdon	9,580	68.61%	4,318	30.93%	64	0.46%	5,262	37.68%	13,962
Indiana	16,673	58.63%	11,620	40.86%	147	0.52%	5,053	17.77%	28,440
Jefferson	11,833	64.61%	6,365	34.75%	116	0.63%	5,468	29.86%	18,314
Juniata	3,863	58.63%	2,705	41.05%	21	0.32%	1,158	17.58%	6,589
Lackawanna	61,644	48.65%	64,926	51.24%	147	0.12%	-3,282	-2.59%	126,717
Lancaster	64,193	69.23%	28,146	30.36%	382	0.41%	36,047	38.87%	92,721
Lawrence	23,319	52.12%	21,164	47.31%	255	0.57%	2,155	4.81%	44,738
Lebanon	20,726	63.83%	11,611	35.76%	135	0.42%	9,115	28.07%	32,472
Lehigh	45,143	57.52%	33,033	42.09%	303	0.39%	12,110	15.43%	78,479
Luzerne	88,967	54.83%	72,579	44.73%	715	0.44%	16,388	10.10%	162,261
Lycoming	25,753	61.60%	15,870	37.96%	184	0.44%	9,883	23.64%	41,807
McKean	15,256	73.43%	5,373	25.86%	147	0.71%	9,883	47.57%	20,776
Mercer	26,424	55.59%	20,770	43.69%	343	0.72%	5,654	11.90%	47,537
Mifflin	8,620	59.22%	5,889	40.46%	47	0.32%	2,731	18.76%	14,556
Monroe	9,502	62.09%	5,760	37.64%	42	0.27%	3,742	24.45%	15,304
Montgomery	115,899	66.62%	57,701	33.17%	373	0.21%	58,198	33.45%	173,973
Montour	3,725	62.12%	2,264	37.76%	7	0.12%	1,461	24.36%	5,996
Northampton	39,131	50.99%	36,993	48.21%	614	0.80%	2,138	2.78%	76,738
Northumberland	28,861	61.71%	17,789	38.04%	119	0.25%	11,072	23.67%	46,769
Perry	6,733	68.76%	3,042	31.07%	17	0.17%	3,691	37.69%	9,792
Philadelphia	396,874	41.40%	557,352	58.15%	4,321	0.45%	-160,478	-16.75%	958,547
Pike	3,810	73.21%	1,383	26.58%	11	0.21%	2,427	46.63%	5,204
Potter	5,117	71.78%	1,974	27.69%	38	0.53%	3,143	44.09%	7,129
Schuylkill	51,437	59.39%	34,987	40.40%	186	0.21%	16,450	18.99%	86,610
Snyder	6,836	80.00%	1,686	19.73%	23	0.27%	5,150	60.27%	8,545
Somerset	18,589	58.42%	13,167	41.38%	64	0.20%	5,422	17.04%	31,820
Sullivan	2,011	61.82%	1,239	38.09%	3	0.09%	772	23.73%	3,253
Susquehanna	10,529	73.97%	3,653	25.66%	52	0.37%	6,876	48.31%	14,234
Tioga	11,203	78.65%	3,006	21.10%	35	0.25%	8,197	57.55%	14,244
Union	6,558	80.16%	1,610	19.68%	13	0.16%	4,948	60.48%	8,181
Venango	17,006	72.16%	6,356	26.97%	204	0.87%	10,650	45.19%	23,566
Warren	11,555	71.55%	4,442	27.50%	153	0.95%	7,113	44.05%	16,150
Washington	36,041	39.16%	55,725	60.55%	270	0.29%	-19,684	-21.39%	92,036
Wayne	9,623	78.96%	2,530	20.76%	34	0.28%	7,093	58.20%	12,187
Westmoreland	58,923	42.24%	80,068	57.40%	503	0.36%	-21,145	-15.16%	139,494
Wyoming	5,772	75.72%	1,815	23.81%	36	0.47%	3,957	51.91%	7,623
York	44,489	52.74%	39,508	46.84%	354	0.42%	4,981	5.90%	84,351
Totals	2,415,789	52.74%	2,146,269	46.85%	18,911	0.41%	269,520	5.89%	4,580,969

==== Counties that flipped from Democratic to Republican ====
- Berks
- Elk
- Northampton
- York

== See also ==
- United States presidential elections in Pennsylvania
