= 1952 United States presidential election =

Election of Dwight D. Eisenhower

- November 4, 1952

531 members of the Electoral College 266 electoral votes needed to win
- Turnout: 63.3% (▲11.1 pp)

Nominee	Dwight D. Eisenhower	Adlai Stevenson II
Party	Republican	Democratic
Home state	New York (Note: Although he grew up in Kansas before his military career, at the time of the 1952 election Eisenhower was president of Columbia University and was, officially, a resident of New York.)	Illinois
Running mate	Richard Nixon	John Sparkman
Electoral vote	442	89
States carried	39	9
Popular vote	34,075,529	27,375,090
Percentage	55.2%	44.3%
- Presidential election results map. Red denotes states won by Eisenhower/Nixon and blue denotes those won by Stevenson/Sparkman. Numbers indicate the number of electoral votes allotted to each state.
President before election
Harry S. Truman
Democratic
Elected President
Dwight D. Eisenhower
Republican

A presidential election was held in the United States on November 4, 1952. The Republican ticket of General Dwight D. Eisenhower and Senator Richard Nixon defeated the Democratic ticket of Illinois Governor Adlai Stevenson II and Senator John Sparkman in a landslide victory, becoming the first Republican administration in 20 years. This was the first election since 1928 without an incumbent president on the ballot.

Harry S. Truman, the incumbent president in 1952, whose second and only full term expired at noon on January 20, 1953

Stevenson emerged victorious on the third presidential ballot of the 1952 Democratic National Convention by defeating Tennessee senator Estes Kefauver, Georgia senator Richard Russell Jr., and other candidates. The Republican nomination was primarily contested by Eisenhower, a general widely popular for his leadership in World War II, and the conservative Ohio senator Robert A. Taft. With the support of Thomas E. Dewey and other party leaders, Eisenhower narrowly prevailed over Taft at the 1952 Republican National Convention. He selected youthful California Senator Richard Nixon as his running mate. In the first televised presidential campaign, Eisenhower was charismatic and very well known, in sharp contrast to Stevenson.

Republicans attacked President Harry S. Truman's handling of the Korean War and the broader Cold War, alleging Soviet spies infiltrated the U.S. government. Democrats faulted Eisenhower for failing to condemn Senators Joseph McCarthy, William E. Jenner, and other reactionary Republicans, who, the Democrats alleged, engaged in reckless and unwarranted attacks. Stevenson tried to separate himself from the unpopular Truman administration. Instead, he campaigned on the popularity of the New Deal and stoked fears of another Great Depression under a Republican administration.

Eisenhower retained his enormous popularity from the war, as was seen in his campaign slogan, "I Like Ike". Eisenhower's public support, coupled with the unpopularity of Truman, allowed him to win comfortably with 55.18% of the popular vote and carry every state outside of the South; he even managed to carry Virginia, Tennessee, Florida, and Texas, Southern states that had voted for Democrats since the end of Reconstruction, with the exception of 1928 (Tennessee also voted Republican in 1920). Eisenhower received over 34 million votes, which at the time was the highest popular vote total a presidential candidate had received, surpassing Franklin D. Roosevelt's record in 1936. Republicans gained among Democrats, especially urban and suburban Southerners, and White ethnic groups in the Northeast and Midwest. This was the only election held between 1932 and 2004 without the incumbent president or vice president on the ballot.

== Nominees ==
=== Republican Party ===
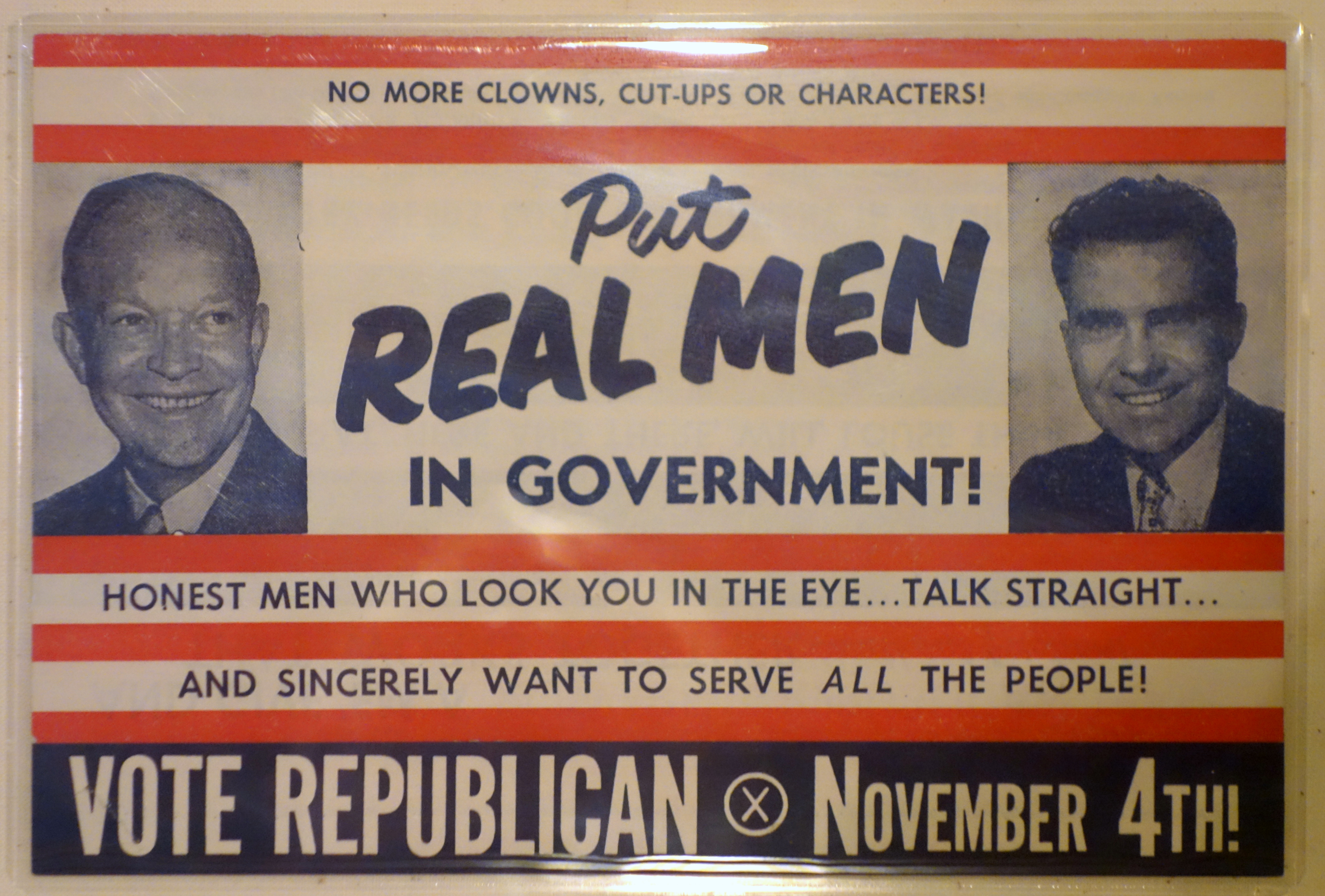
Eisenhower/Nixon campaign poster

Republican Party (United States) 1952 Republican Party ticket
Dwight D. Eisenhower	Richard Nixon
for President	for Vice President
Supreme Allied Commander Europe (SACEUR) (1951–1952)	U.S. Senator from California (1950–1953)
Campaign

Republican candidates:
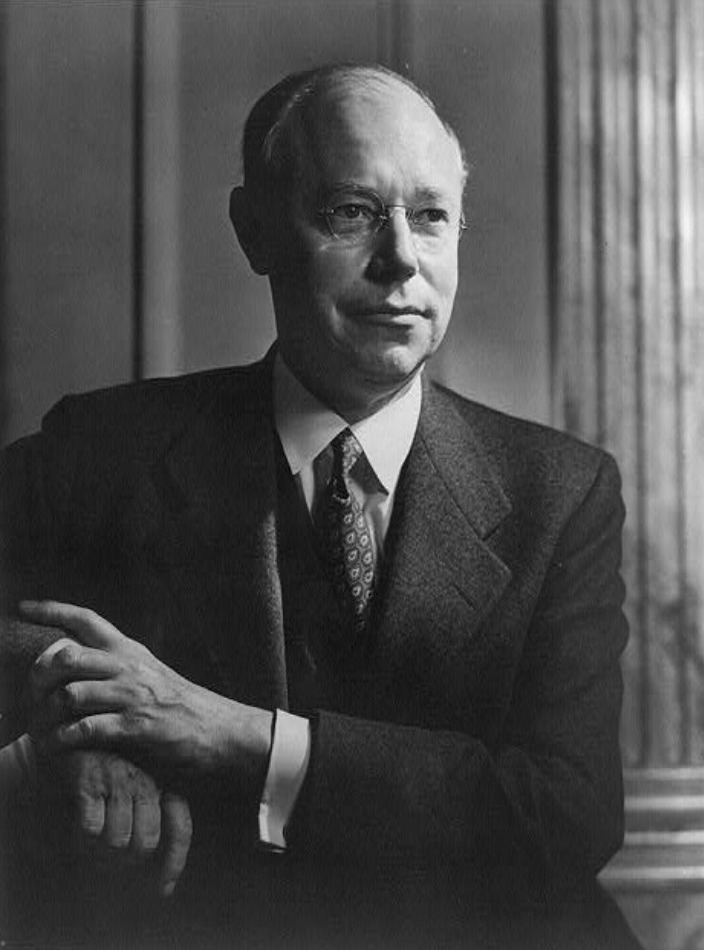
Senator
Robert A. Taft
from Ohio

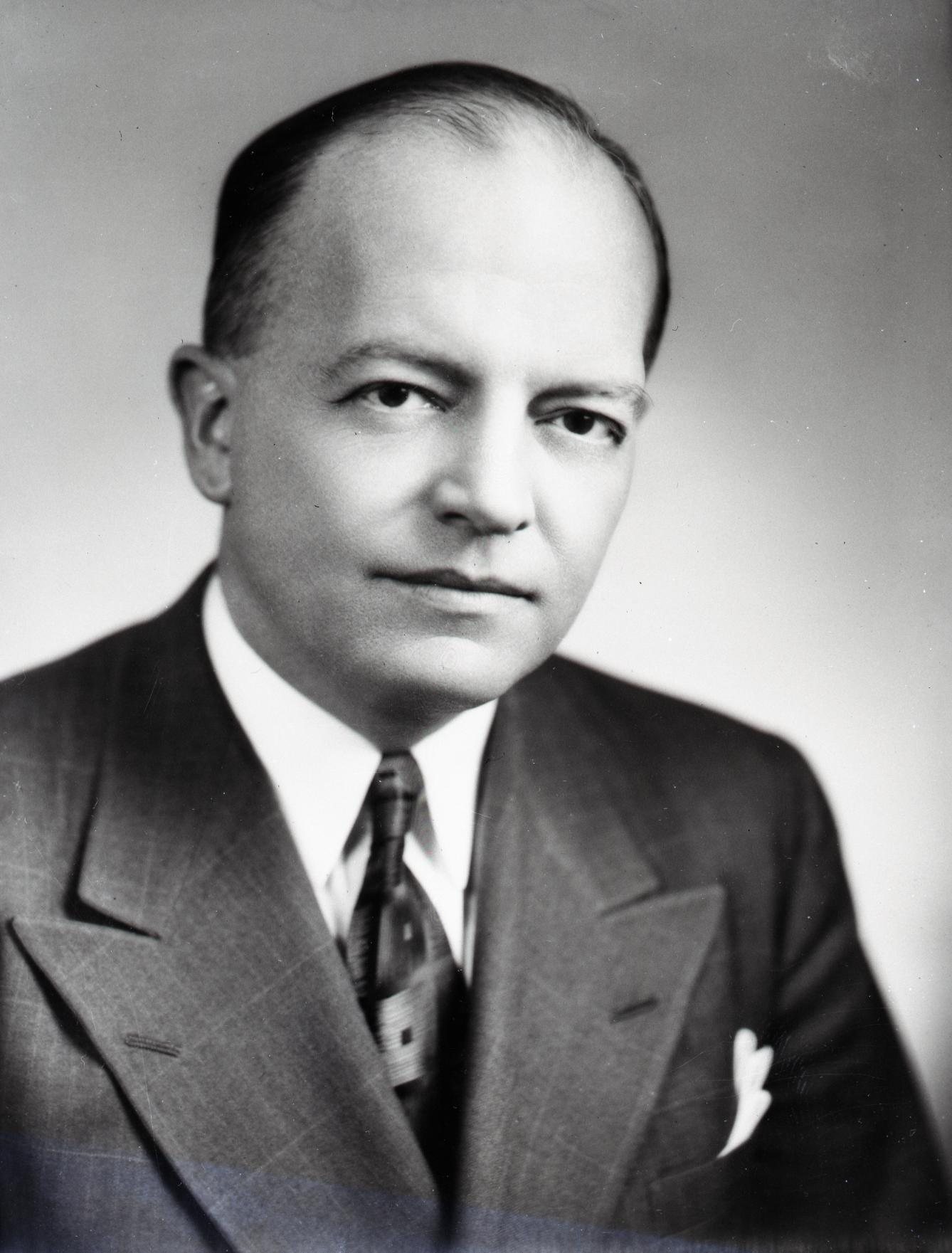
Former Governor
Harold Stassen
of Minnesota

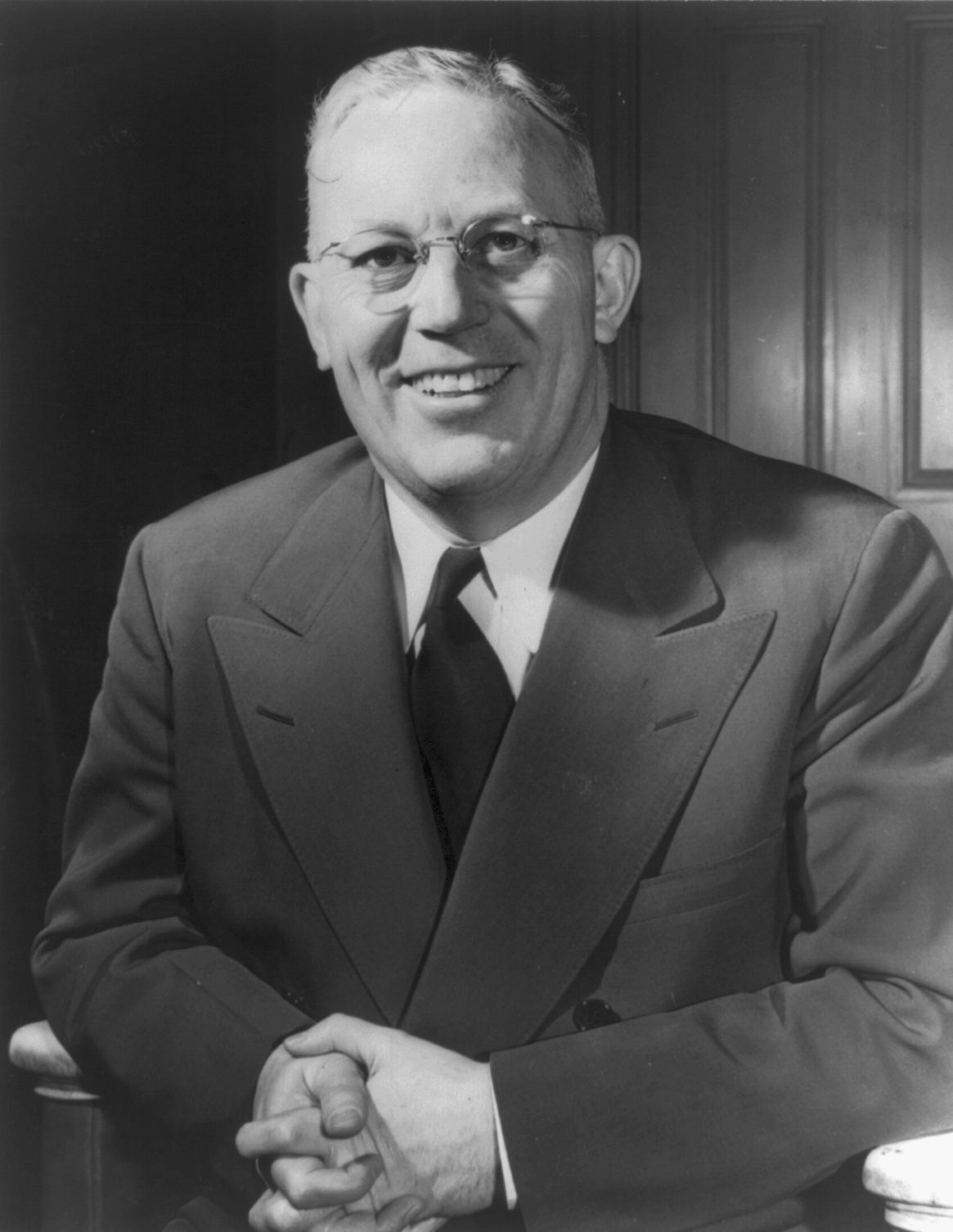
Governor
Earl Warren
of California

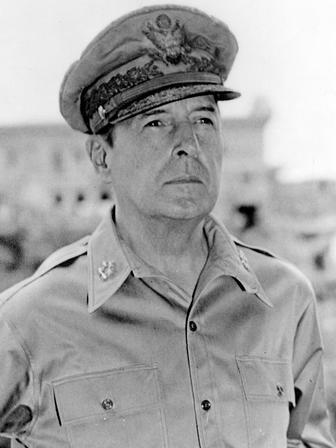
General of the Army Douglas MacArthur, from New York

The fight for the Republican nomination was between General Dwight D. Eisenhower, who became the candidate of the party's moderate Eastern Establishment; Senator Robert A. Taft from Ohio, the longtime leader of the party's conservative wing; Governor Earl Warren of California, who appealed to Western delegates and independent voters; and former Governor Harold Stassen of Minnesota, who still had a base of support in the Midwest.

The moderate Eastern Republicans were led by New York Governor Thomas E. Dewey, the party's presidential nominee in 1944 and 1948. The moderates tended to be interventionists who felt that the country needed to fight the Cold War overseas and confront the Soviet Union in Eurasia. They were also willing to accept most aspects of the social welfare state created by the New Deal in the 1930s but sought to reform the programs to be more efficient and business-friendly. The moderates were also concerned with ending the Republicans' losing streak in presidential elections and felt that the popular Eisenhower had the best chance of beating the Democrats. For that reason, Dewey declined the notion of a third run for president despite his large amount of support within the party. The Republicans had been out of power for 20 years, and there was a strong sentiment that a proper two-party system needed to be re-established. It was also felt that the party winning the White House would have more incentive to rein in radicals and demagogues such as Wisconsin Senator Joseph McCarthy.

The conservative Republicans, led by Taft, were based in the Midwest and parts of the South. The Midwest was a bastion of conservatism and isolationist sentiment. Dislike of Europeans, in particular the British, was common, and there was a widespread feeling that the British manipulated American foreign policy and were eager to kowtow to the Soviet Union, although such attitudes had begun to change among the younger generation who had fought in World War II. In addition, the conservatives opposed much of the New Deal, regarding these programs as diminishing individual liberty and economic freedom. Taft had unsuccessfully sought the Republican nomination in the 1940 and 1948 presidential elections but lost both times to moderate candidates from New York: Wilkie and Dewey, respectively. At the age of 63, Taft felt that it was his last chance to run for president, so his friends and supporters, encompassing many party regulars, worked diligently on his behalf. His feelings were correct, as he died about nine months after the election.

Warren, although highly popular in California, refused to campaign in the presidential primaries, which limited his chances of winning the nomination. He retained the support of the California delegation, and his supporters hoped that in the event of an Eisenhower–Taft deadlock, Warren might emerge as a compromise candidate.

After being persuaded to run, Eisenhower scored a major victory in the New Hampshire primary in which his supporters wrote his name onto the ballot and gave him an upset victory over Taft. However, until the Republican National Convention, the primaries were divided fairly evenly between the two, and when the convention opened, the race for the nomination was still too close to call. Taft won the Nebraska, Wisconsin, Illinois, and South Dakota primaries, and Eisenhower won those in New Jersey, Pennsylvania, Massachusetts and Oregon. Stassen and Warren won only their home states of Minnesota and California, respectively, which effectively ended their chances of earning the nomination. General Douglas MacArthur also won the support of ten delegates from various states.

==== Republican National Convention ====
When the 1952 Republican National Convention opened in Chicago, most political experts rated Taft and Eisenhower as about equal in delegate vote totals. Eisenhower's managers, led by both Dewey and Massachusetts Senator Henry Cabot Lodge Jr., accused Taft of "stealing" delegate votes in Southern states such as Texas and Georgia, and claimed that Taft's leaders in those states had unfairly denied delegate spots to Eisenhower supporters, putting Taft delegates in their place. Lodge and Dewey proposed to evict the Taft delegates in those states and replace them with Eisenhower delegates and called the proposal "Fair Play". Although Taft and his supporters angrily denied that charge, the convention voted to support Fair Play 658 to 548, and Taft lost many Southern delegates. Eisenhower's chances were boosted when several uncommitted state delegations, such as Michigan and Pennsylvania, decided to support him and also when Stassen released his delegates and asked them to support Eisenhower. The removal of many Southern delegates and the support of the uncommitted states decided the nomination in Eisenhower's favor.

However, the convention was among the most bitter and emotional in American history. When Senator Everett Dirksen from Illinois, a Taft supporter, pointed at Dewey on the convention floor during a speech and accused him of leading the Republicans "down the road to defeat", mixed boos and cheers rang out from the delegates, and there were even fistfights between some Taft and Eisenhower delegates.

In the end, Eisenhower narrowly defeated Taft on the first ballot. To heal the wounds caused by the battle, he visited Taft's hotel suite and met with him. Taft issued a brief statement congratulating Eisenhower on his victory, but he was bitter about the accusation that he had stolen delegates and withheld his active support for Eisenhower for several weeks after the convention. In September 1952, Taft and Eisenhower met again at Morningside Heights, in New York City. Taft promised there an active support of Eisenhower in exchange for the fulfillment of a number of requests such as a demand that Eisenhower would offer Taft's followers a fair share of patronage positions if he won the election and that Eisenhower would agree to balance the federal budget and "fight creeping domestic socialism in every field". Eisenhower agreed to the terms, and Taft campaigned assiduously for the Republican ticket. In fact, Eisenhower and Taft agreed on most domestic issues, and their disagreements were primarily on foreign policy.

Though there were initial suggestions that Warren could earn the party's vice-presidential slot for the second successive election if he withdrew and endorsed Eisenhower, he ultimately chose not to do so. Eisenhower wished to award the vice-presidential nod to Stassen, who had endorsed Eisenhower and held generally similar political positions. However, the party bosses wanted to find a running mate who could mollify Taft's supporters, as the schism between the moderate and conservative wings was so severe that it was feared that party's conservatives would run Taft as a third-party candidate.

Eisenhower had apparently given little thought to choosing his running mate. When asked, he replied that he assumed the convention would pick someone. The spot ultimately fell to the young California Senator Richard Nixon, who was viewed as a centrist. Nixon was known as an aggressive campaigner and a fierce anti-communist but as one who shied away from some of the more extreme ideas of the party's right wing, including isolationism and the dismantling of the New Deal. Most historians now believe that Eisenhower's nomination was the result of his perceived electability against the Democrats. Most of the delegates were conservatives who would probably have supported Taft if they felt that he could win the general election.

Though not earning the presidential or the vice-presidential nominations, Warren would be appointed as Chief Justice of the United States in October 1953, and Stassen would hold various positions within Eisenhower's administration.

The balloting at the Republican convention went as follows:

Presidential balloting, RNC 1952
Ballot	1st before shifts	1st after shifts
Dwight D. Eisenhower	595	845
Robert A. Taft	500	280
Earl Warren	81	77
Harold Stassen	20	0
Douglas MacArthur	10	4

=== Democratic Party ===
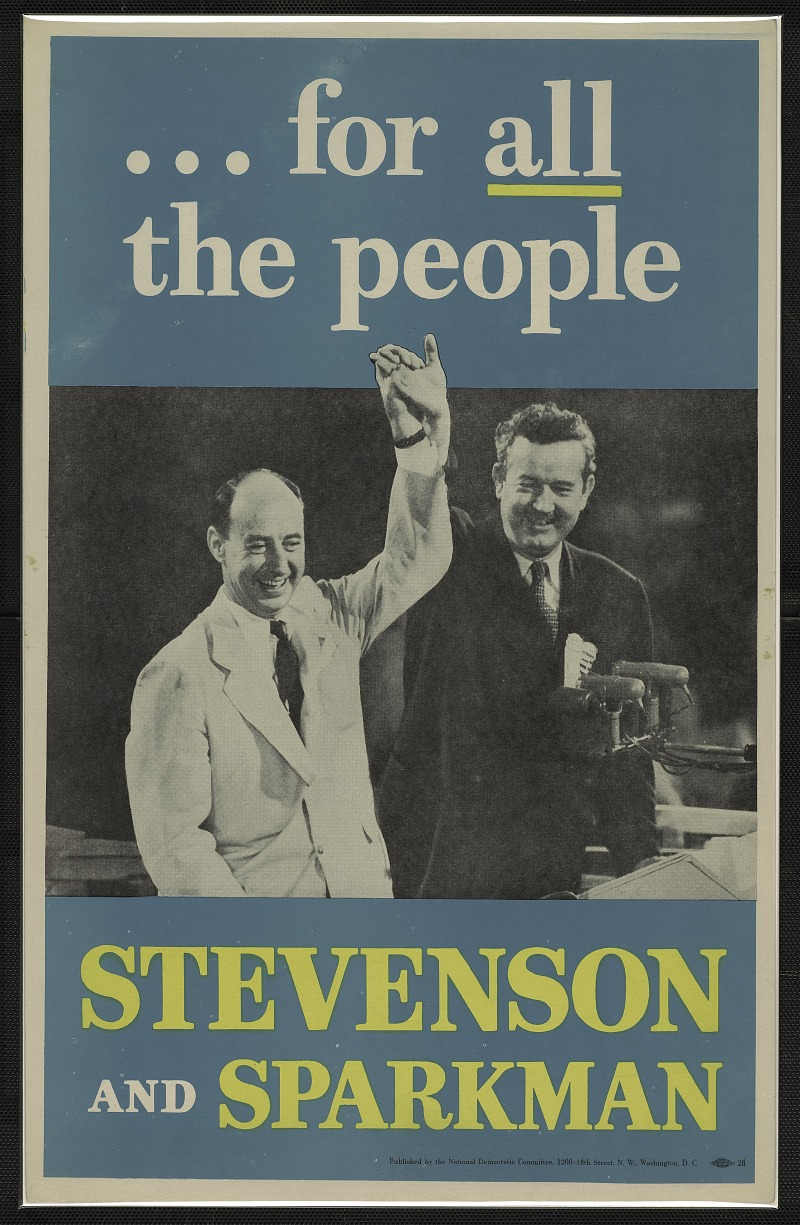
A campaign poster for Adlai Stevenson and his running mate John Sparkman

Democratic Party (United States) 1952 Democratic Party ticket
Adlai Stevenson	John Sparkman
for President	for Vice President
31st Governor of Illinois (1949–1953)	U.S. Senator from Alabama (1946–1979)
Campaign

Democratic candidates:
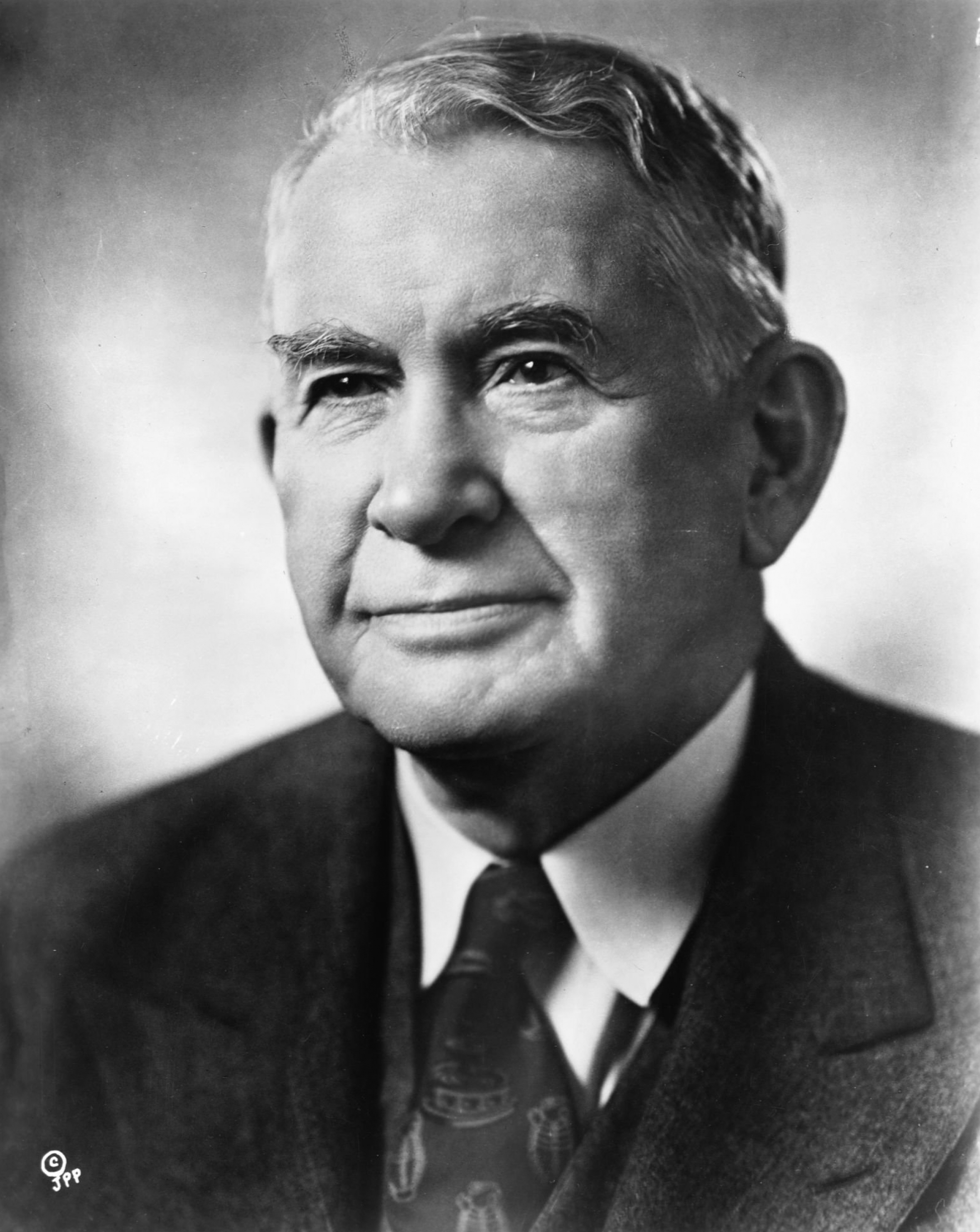
Vice President
Alben W. Barkley

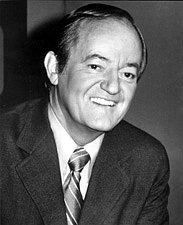
Senator Hubert Humphrey from Minnesota

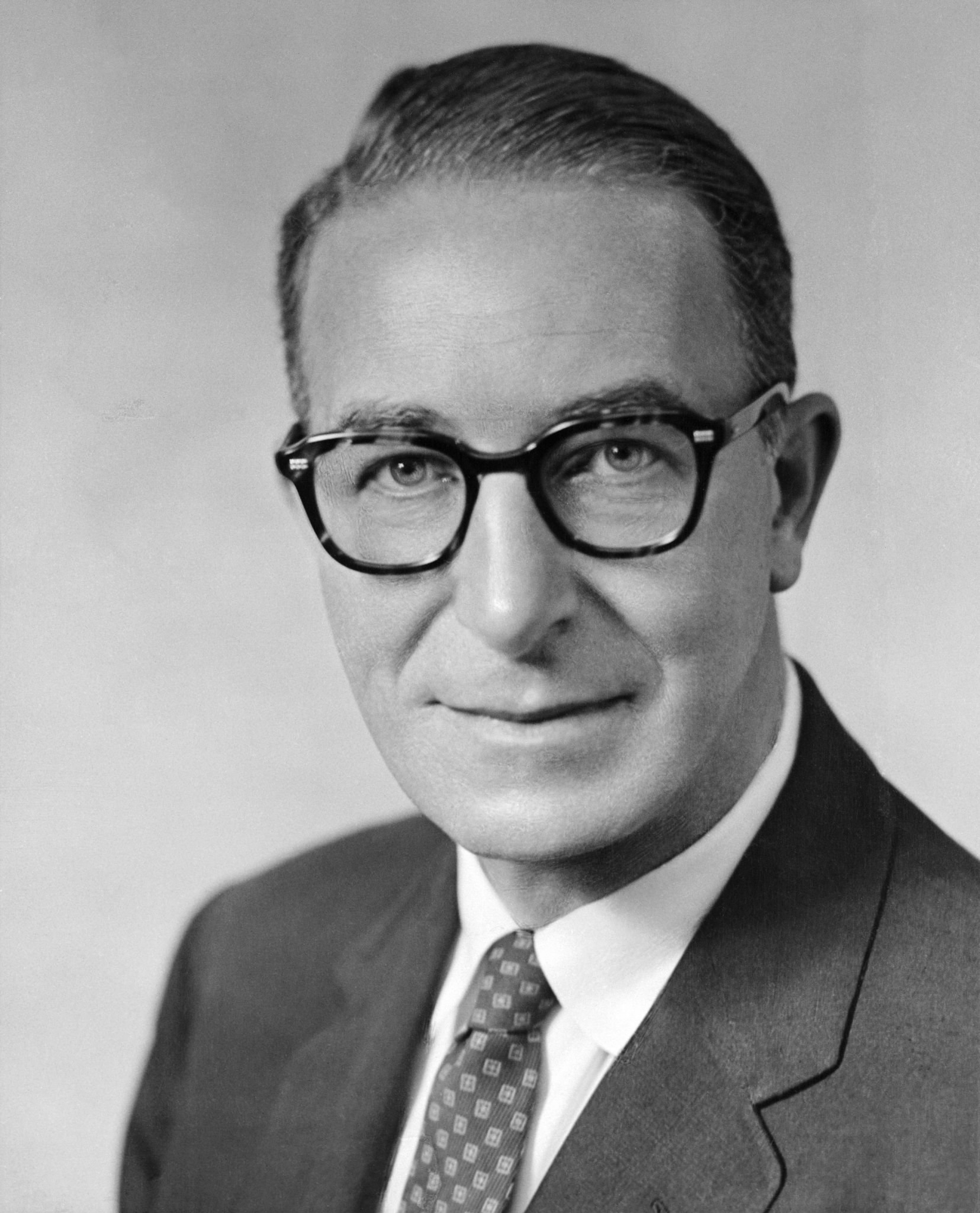
Senator Estes Kefauver from Tennessee

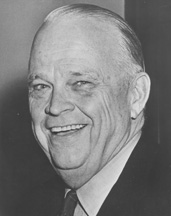
Senator Robert S. Kerr from Oklahoma

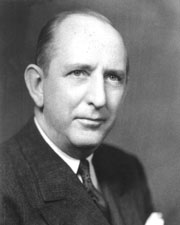
Senator Richard Russell Jr. from Georgia

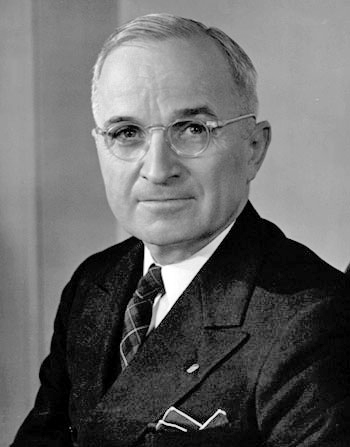
President Harry S. Truman from Missouri

The expected candidate for the Democratic nomination was the incumbent President Harry S. Truman. Since the newly passed 22nd Amendment did not apply to whomever was president at the time of its passage, he was eligible to run again. However, Truman entered 1952 with his popularity plummeting, according to polls. The bloody and indecisive Korean War was dragging into its third year, Senator Joseph McCarthy's anti-communist crusade was stirring public fears of an encroaching "Red Menace", and the disclosure of widespread corruption among federal employees (including some high-level members of the Truman administration) left Truman at a low political ebb. Polls showed that he had a 66% disapproval rating, a record that would be matched only decades later by Richard Nixon and surpassed by George W. Bush.

Kefauver won all but three of sixteen primaries but failed to win the nomination.

Truman's main opponent was the populist Tennessee Senator Estes Kefauver, who had chaired a nationally televised investigation of organized crime in 1951 and was known as a crusader against crime and corruption. The Gallup poll of February 15 showed Truman's weakness. Nationally, Truman was the choice of only 36% of Democrats, compared with 21% for Kefauver. Among independent voters, however, Truman had only 18%, and Kefauver led with 36%. In the New Hampshire primary, Kefauver upset Truman by winning 19,800 votes to Truman's 15,927 and capturing all eight delegates. Kefauver graciously said that he did not consider his victory "a repudiation of Administration policies, but a desire ... for new ideas and personalities". Stung by that setback, however, Truman announced March 29 that he would not seek re-election. Truman insisted in his memoirs, however, that he had decided not to run for re-election well before his defeat to Kefauver.

With Truman's withdrawal, Kefauver became the frontrunner for the nomination, and he won most of the primaries. Other primary winners were Senator Hubert Humphrey, who won his home state of Minnesota; Senator Richard Russell Jr. from Georgia, who won the Florida primary, and the diplomat W. Averell Harriman, who won the Washington D.C. contest. However, most states still chose their delegates to the Democratic Convention by state conventions, which meant that the party bosses, especially the mayors and governors of large Northern and Midwestern states and cities, were able to choose the Democratic nominee. The bosses, including Truman himself, strongly disliked Kefauver since his investigations of organized crime had revealed connections between American Mafia figures and many of the big-city Democratic political organizations. The party bosses thus viewed Kefauver as a maverick who could not be trusted and so refused to support him for the nomination.

Instead, with Truman taking the initiative, they began to search for other more acceptable candidates. However, most of the other candidates had a major weakness. Russell had much Southern support, but his support of racial segregation and his opposition to civil rights for black people led many liberal Northern and Midwestern delegates, pressed by their many black voters, to reject him. Truman favored Harriman of New York, but the latter had never held an elective office and was inexperienced in politics. Truman next turned to Vice President Alben W. Barkley but, at 74, he was rejected as being too old by leaders of labor unions. Other minor or favorite son candidates included Oklahoma Senator Robert S. Kerr, Massachusetts Governor Paul A. Dever, Minnesota Senator Hubert Humphrey, and Arkansas Senator J. William Fulbright.

One candidate soon emerged who seemingly had few political weaknesses: Governor Adlai Stevenson of Illinois. The grandson of former Vice President Adlai E. Stevenson, he came from a distinguished family in Illinois and was well known as a gifted orator, intellectual, and political moderate. In the spring of 1952, Truman attempted to convince Stevenson to take the presidential nomination, but Stevenson said that he wanted to run for re-election as Governor of Illinois. However, Stevenson never completely took himself out of the race, and as the convention approached, many party bosses and normally apolitical citizens hoped that he could be "drafted" to run.

==== Democratic National Convention ====
The 1952 Democratic National Convention was held in Chicago in the same Coliseum that the Republicans had gathered in several weeks earlier. Since the convention was being held in his home state, Governor Stevenson, who still proclaimed that he was not a presidential candidate, was asked to give the welcoming address to the delegates. He proceeded to give a witty and stirring address that led his supporters to begin a renewed round of efforts to nominate him despite his protests. After meeting with Jacob Arvey, the boss of the Illinois delegation, Stevenson finally agreed to enter his name as a candidate for the nomination. The party bosses from other large Northern and Midwestern states quickly joined in support. Kefauver led on the first ballot, but he had far fewer votes than necessary to win. Stevenson gradually gained strength until he was nominated on the third ballot.

After the delegates nominated Stevenson, the convention then turned to selecting a vice-presidential nominee. After narrowing it down to Senators John Sparkman and A. S. Mike Monroney, President Truman and a small group of political insiders chose Sparkman, a conservative segregationist from Alabama, for the nomination. The convention largely complied and nominated Sparkman as Stevenson's running mate. He was chosen because of his Southern identity and conservative record, which party leaders hoped would create a balanced ticket.

Sparkman remained in the Senate until his retirement in 1979.

== General election ==
CBS News' coverage of the 1952 United States presidential election

=== Polling ===
Poll source	Date(s) administered	Dwight Eisenhower (R)	Adlai Stevenson (D)	Other	Undecided	Margin
Election Results	November 4, 1952	55.18%	44.33%	0.49%	-	10.85
Gallup	Oct. 28-Nov. 1, 1952	47%	40%	-	13%	7
Gallup	October 17-22, 1952	47.5%	39.5%	-	13%	8
Gallup	October 9-14, 1952	48%	39%	-	13%	9
Gallup	October 3-8, 1952	51%	38%	-	11%	13
Gallup	Sep. 28-Oct. 2, 1952	50%	38%	-	12%	12
Gallup	September 11-16, 1952	55%	40%	-	5%	15
Gallup	July 25-30, 1952	47%	41%	-	12%	6
July 21–26: Democratic National Convention
July 7–11: Republican National Convention
Gallup	May 30-Jun. 4, 1952	59%	31%	-	10%	28

=== Campaigns ===
The Eisenhower campaign was one of the first presidential campaigns to make a major and concerted effort to win the female vote. Many of his radio and television commercials discussed topics such as education, inflation, ending the Korean War, and other issues that were thought to appeal to women. The Eisenhower campaign made extensive use of female campaign workers, who made phone calls to likely Eisenhower voters, distributed "Ike" buttons and leaflets, and threw parties to build support for the Republican ticket in their neighborhoods. On election day, Eisenhower won a solid majority of the female vote.

Eisenhower campaigned by attacking "Korea, Communism, and Corruption", issues that the Republicans regarded as the failures of the outgoing Truman administration to solve. The Eisenhower campaign accused the administration of "neglecting Latin America" and thus "leading them into the arms of wily Communist agents waiting to exploit local misery and capitalize on any opening to communize the Americas". Charges that Soviet spies had infiltrated the government plagued the Truman administration and became a "major campaign issue" for Eisenhower. The Republicans blamed the Democrats for the military's failure to be fully prepared to fight in Korea, accused the Democrats of harboring communist spies within the federal government, and criticized the Truman administration for the many officials who had been accused of various crimes.

Stevenson hoped to exploit the rift between the conservative Taft Republicans and the moderate Eisenhower Republicans. In a speech in Baltimore, Stevenson said, "The GOP elephant has two heads nowadays, and I can't tell from day to day who's driving the poor beast, Senator Taft or the General. I doubt that America will entrust its future, its hopes, to the master of a house divided against itself." Stevenson, Truman, and other Democrats campaigning that fall also criticized Senators Joseph McCarthy, William E. Jenner, and other right-wing Republicans for what they believed were reckless and unwarranted attacks and congressional investigations into leading government officials and public servants. In a Salt Lake City speech Stevenson stated that right-wing Republicans were "quick with accusations, with defamatory hints and whispering campaigns when they see a chance to scare or silence those with whom they disagree. Rudely, carelessly, they invade the field of thought, of conscience, which belongs to God, and not to Senators. ... McCarthy and men like him can say almost anything, and if my opponent's conscience permits, he can try to help all of them get reelected." Stevenson said that right-wing attacks on government officials such as General George Marshall, who had served Truman as US Secretary of State and US Secretary of Defense, reflected a "middle of the gutter approach" to politics. Truman repeatedly criticized Senator McCarthy's character and temperament and called on Eisenhower to repudiate him. Stevenson ridiculed right-wing Republicans "who hunt Communists in the Bureau of Wildlife and Fisheries while hesitating to aid the gallant men and women who are resisting the real thing in the front lines of Europe and Asia. ... They are finally the men who seemingly believe that we can confound the Kremlin by frightening ourselves to death." In return, McCarthy often jokingly confused the names Adlai and Alger, the first name of the convicted Soviet spy Alger Hiss, by stating "Alger, I mean Adlai" in his speeches. McCarthy exploited the fact that Stevenson had defended Hiss as innocent despite all of the evidence otherwise. McCarthy, in response to Stevenson's criticisms, also stated during the campaign that he would like to get on the Stevenson campaign trail "with a club and make a good and loyal American" out of Stevenson.

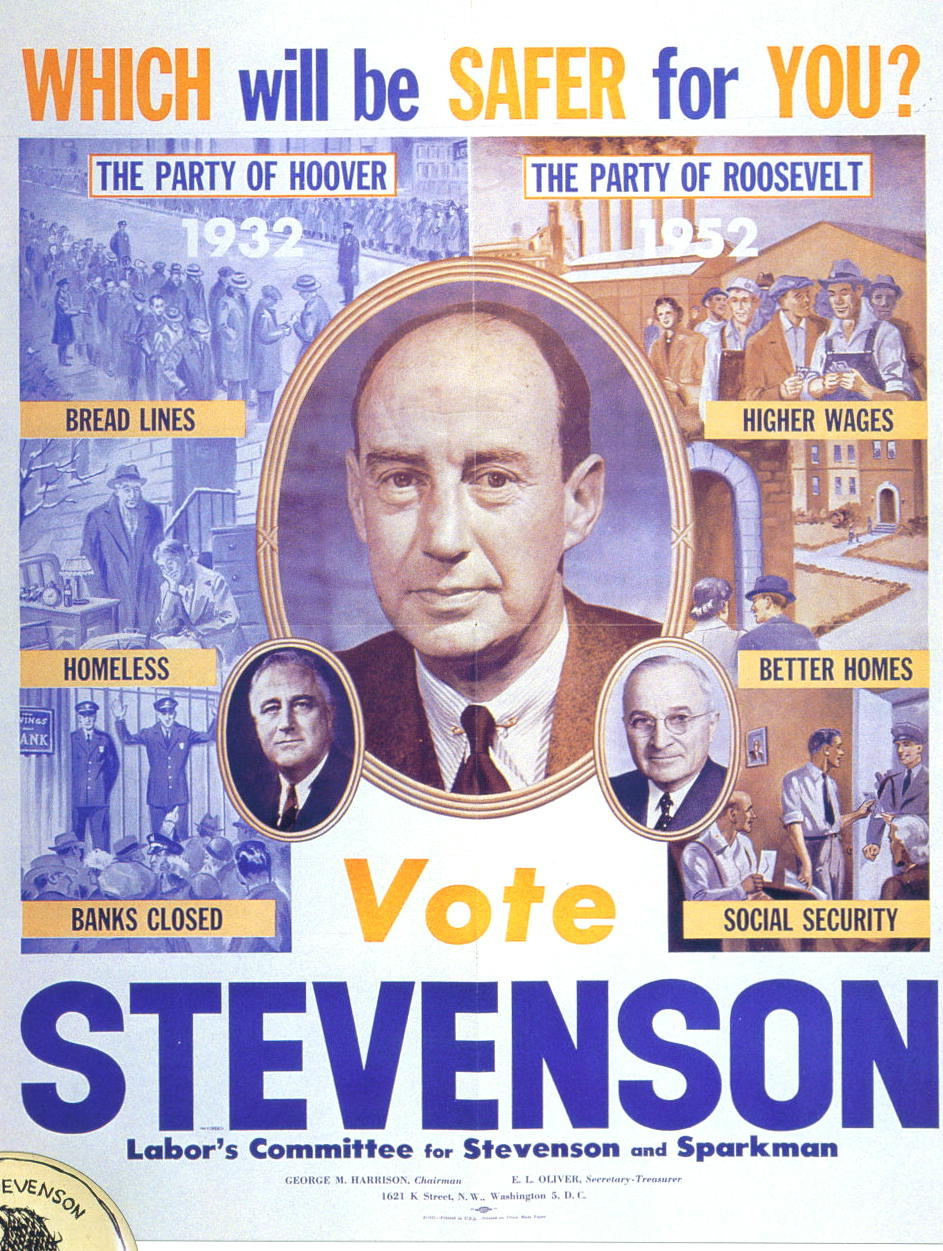
Adlai Stevenson warns against a return of the Republican policies of President Herbert Hoover.

Neither Stevenson nor Sparkman had been a part of the Truman administration, and both largely ignored its record, preferred to hark back to the Roosevelt's New Deal achievements, and warned against a repetition of the Great Depression under President Herbert Hoover if Eisenhower was elected. The historian Herbert Parmet stated that, "although Stevenson tried to separate his campaign from Truman's record, his efforts failed to dispel the widespread recognition that, for a divided America, torn by paranoia and unable to understand what had disrupted the anticipated tranquility of the postwar world, the time for change had really arrived. Neither Stevenson nor anyone else could have dissuaded the electorate from its desire to repudiate 'Trumanism'."

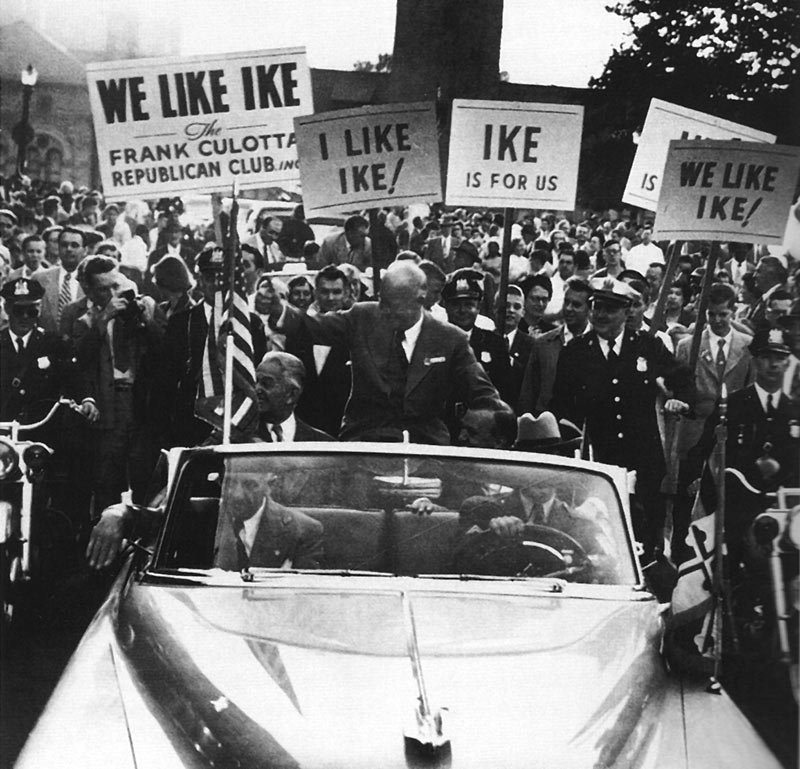
Eisenhower presidential campaign in Baltimore, Maryland, September 1952

Eisenhower's goal to unite the Republican Party for the fall campaign led him to campaign with and endorse several Republicans with whom he was uncomfortable. In particular, he resented having to endorse Senator William Jenner's reelection campaign when campaigning in Indianapolis, due to Jenner's accusations against George Marshall as being "a living lie" who was "joining hands once more with this criminal crowd of traitors and Communist appeasers ... under the direction of Mr. Truman and Mr. Acheson". Many Democrats were particularly upset when Eisenhower, on a scheduled campaign swing through Wisconsin, decided not to give a speech he had written criticizing McCarthy's methods without naming him and later allowed himself to be photographed shaking hands with McCarthy as if he had supported McCarthy. Truman, who had once been friends with Eisenhower, never forgot what he saw as a betrayal. He had previously thought Eisenhower would make a good president but said that "he has betrayed almost everything I thought he stood for."

Eisenhower retained his enormous personal popularity from his leading role in World War II, and huge crowds turned out to see him around the nation. His campaign slogan, "I Like Ike", was one of the most popular in American history. Stevenson attracted the support of the young emerging postwar intellectual class, but Eisenhower was seen as more appealing to Main Street. Stevenson was ridiculed in some quarters as too effeminate to be president, which was sometimes used as a euphemism for a male homosexual. The staunchly-conservative New York Daily News called him "Adelaide" Stevenson even though he had a reputation as a ladies' man, divorced in 1949, and remained single throughout 1952.

=== Nixon scandal and "Checkers speech" ===
A notable event of the 1952 campaign concerned a scandal that emerged when Richard Nixon, Eisenhower's running mate, was accused by several newspapers of receiving $18,000 in undeclared "gifts" from wealthy donors. In reality, contributions were by design only from early supporters and limited to $1,000, with full accountability. Nixon, who had been accusing the Democrats of hiding corruption, suddenly found himself on the defensive. Eisenhower and his aides even considered dropping Nixon from the ticket and picking Senator William Knowland as a replacement running mate.

Eisenhower, who barely knew Nixon, waffled and refused to comment on the incident. Nixon saved his political career, however, with a dramatic half-hour speech, the "Checkers speech", on live television. In this speech, Nixon denied the charges against him, gave a detailed account of his modest financial assets, and offered a glowing assessment of Eisenhower's candidacy. The highlight of the speech came when Nixon stated that a supporter had given his daughters a gift, a dog named Checkers, and that he would not return it because his daughters loved it. The "Checkers speech" led hundreds of thousands of citizens nationwide to wire the Republican National Committee to urge the Republican Party to keep Nixon on the ticket, and Eisenhower stayed with him.

Despite the red-baiting of the Republicans' right wing, the campaign on the whole was conducted with a considerable degree of dignity, and Stevenson was seen as reinvigorating a Democratic Party that had become exhausted after 20 years in power and as refreshing its appeal with younger voters. He accused Eisenhower of silently tolerating McCarthy's excesses. Stevenson went before the American Legion, a bastion of hardline conservatism, and boldly declared that there was nothing patriotic or American about what McCarthy was doing.

Even with the dignified nature of the campaign, the dislike between the two candidates was visible. Stevenson criticized Eisenhower's noncondemnation of McCarthy and his use of television spots, and Eisenhower, who had initially respected Stevenson, came in time to view him as simply another career politician, which he strongly disliked.

=== Television ===
The 1952 election campaign was the first one to make use of the new medium of television, partly by the efforts of Rosser Reeves, the head of Ted Bates, Inc., a leading advertising firm. Reeves had initially proposed a series of radio spots to Dewey in the 1948 campaign, but Dewey considered them undignified. Reeves later maintained that Dewey might have won the election if he had been slightly more open-minded.

Studying Douglas MacArthur's keynote speech at the Republican Convention in July, Reeves believed that the general's words were "powerful" but "unfocused" and "all over the map". Eisenhower's public speeches were even worse since he was unable to make his point to the voting public in a clear intelligible manner. Reeves felt that Eisenhower needed to condense his message down to a few simple easily-digestible slogans.

Eisenhower at first also fared poorly on television and had a difficult time appearing relaxed and at ease on camera. The television lighting was not flattering and made him look old and unattractive. In particular, his forehead tended to glisten under the lights. Eisenhower became upset when the CBS correspondent Dave Schoenbrun pointed that out and suggested him to try to alter his poses to make his forehead less noticeable and to apply makeup so that it would not shine from the lighting. Eventually, he gave in and agreed to those modifications. Reeves also wanted Eisenhower to not wear his eyeglasses on camera to look younger, but since he could not read the prompter board without them, Reeves devised a large handwritten signboard.

Reeves's television work, although pioneering, was the subject of considerable criticism on the grounds that he was attempting to sell a presidential candidate to the public in the same manner that one might sell a car or a brand of toothpaste. The liberal journalist Marya Mannes mocked the approach with this ditty: "Eisenhower hits the spot/One full general, that's a lot/Feeling sluggish, feeling sick?/Take a dose of Ike and Dick!/Philip Morris, Lucky Strike/Alka-Seltzer, I like Ike!" For his part, Stevenson would have nothing to do with television at all and condemned Eisenhower's use of the medium by calling it "selling the presidency like cereal". He made a point of the fact that he did not watch or even own a television, and the same went for many members of his inner circle.

Both campaigns made use of television ads. A notable ad for Eisenhower was an issue-free feel-good animated cartoon with a soundtrack song by Irving Berlin called "I Like Ike". For the first time, a presidential candidate's personal medical history was released publicly, as were partial versions of his financial histories, because of the issues that had been raised in Nixon's speech. Near the end of the campaign, Eisenhower, in a major speech, announced that if he won the election he would go to Korea to see if he could end the war. His great military prestige, combined with the public's weariness with the conflict, gave Eisenhower the final boost he needed to win.

Throughout the entire campaign, Eisenhower led in all opinion polls and by wide margins in most of them.

=== Citizens for Eisenhower ===
To circumvent the local Republican Party organizations, which were mostly controlled by Taft supporters, Charles F. Willis and Stanley M. Rumbough Jr. created a nationwide network of grassroots clubs, "Citizens for Eisenhower". Independents and Democrats were welcome, as the group specialized in canvassing neighborhoods and holding small-group meetings. Eisenhower, when accepting the Republican nomination, specifically credited the two men, saying that he would not have been there without their efforts. Citizens for Eisenhower hoped to revitalize the party by expanding its activist ranks and by supporting moderate and internationalist policies. It did not endorse candidates other than Eisenhower, but he paid it little attention after he had won, and it failed to maintain its impressive starting momentum. Instead, it energized the conservative Republicans, which led finally to the Barry Goldwater campaign of 1964. Longtime Republican activists viewed the newcomers with suspicion and hostility. More significantly, activism in support of Eisenhower did not translate into enthusiasm for the party's cause.

=== Results ===
1952 Victory Speech
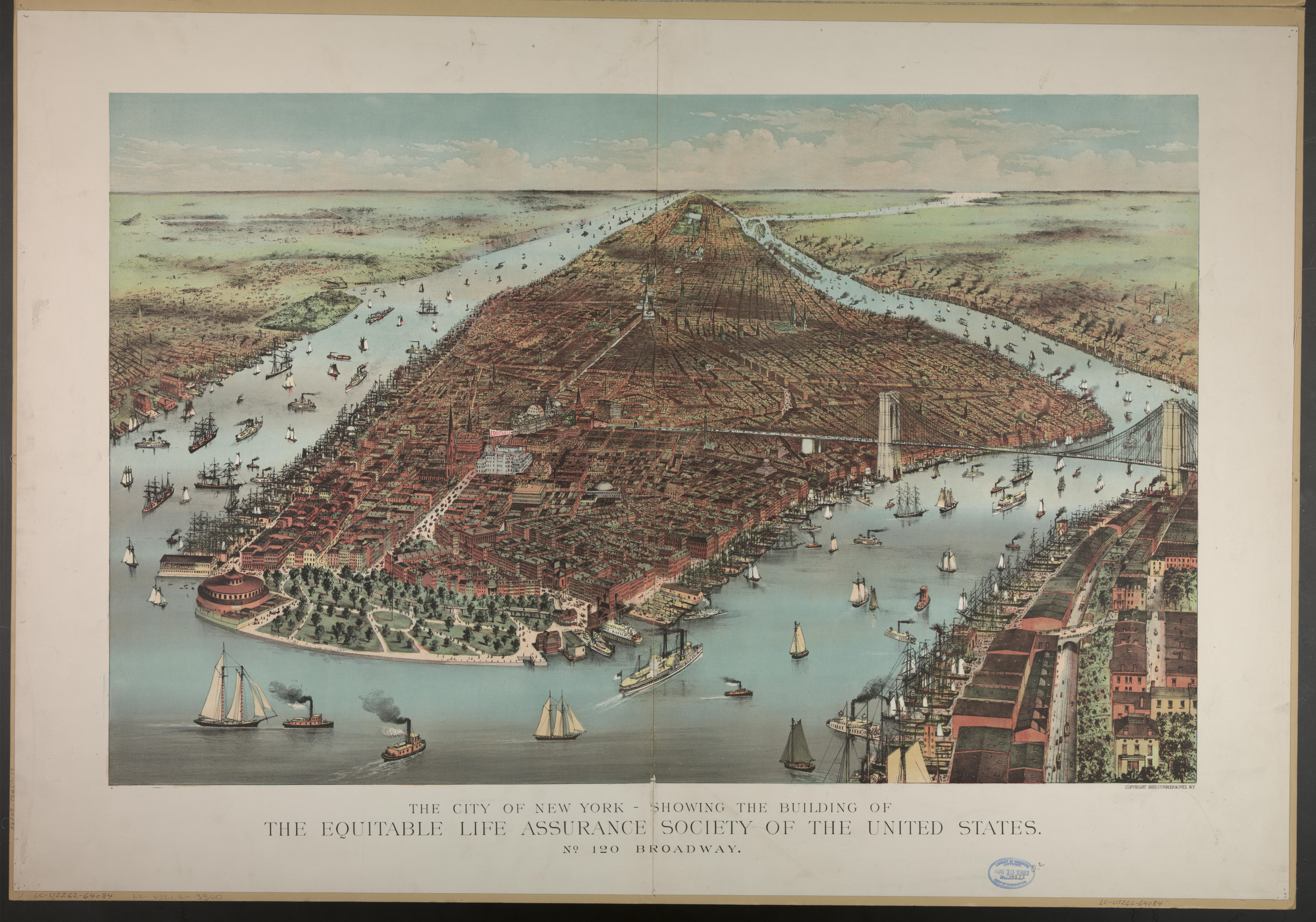
- Orator: Dwight D. Eisenhower
- Date: Nov 5, 1952
- Location: Hotel Commodore; New York City

Key Quote
- "Let us unite for the better future for America, for our children and for our grandchildren... let us really put into practice... a single purpose of a better future."

On election day, Eisenhower won a decisive victory by winning over 55% of the popular vote and carrying 39 of the 48 states. Stevenson did not win a single state north of the Mason–Dixon line or west of Arkansas; he did succeed in winning back the four states which Strom Thurmond had won at the previous election, but lost all but five of the states that Truman had won that year. Eisenhower took three Southern states that the Republicans had won only once since Reconstruction: Virginia, Florida, and Texas. He also carried Tennessee, a state that only voted for Republicans twice after Reconstruction. It was the last time the Republicans won Missouri until 1968 and the last time that a Republican won the election without Kentucky. Stevenson's 700-vote win was the smallest percentage margin in any state since Woodrow Wilson had won New Hampshire by 56 votes in 1916.

Of the 3,099 counties/independent cities making returns, Eisenhower won the most popular votes in 2,104 (67.89%) while Stevenson carried 995 (32.11%). Eisenhower won in 21 of the 39 cities with a population above 250,000. He won in six of the eight largest Southern cities.

The election was the first in which a computer, the UNIVAC I (and Monrobot III), was used to predict the results; it came within 3.5% of Eisenhower's popular vote tally and four votes of his electoral vote total.

Electoral results
Presidential candidate	Party	Home state	Popular vote		Electoral vote	Running mate		
Presidential candidate	Party	Home state	Count	Percentage	Electoral vote	Vice-presidential candidate	Home state	Electoral vote
Dwight D. Eisenhower	Republican	New York	34,075,529	55.18%	442	Richard Nixon	California	442
Adlai Stevenson II	Democratic	Illinois	27,375,090	44.33%	89	John Sparkman	Alabama	89
Vincent Hallinan	Progressive	California	140,746	0.23%	0	Charlotta Bass	New York	0
Stuart Hamblen	Prohibition	Texas	73,412	0.12%	0	Enoch A. Holtwick	Illinois	0
Eric Hass	Socialist Labor	New York	30,406	0.05%	0	Stephen Emery	New York	0
Darlington Hoopes	Socialist	Pennsylvania	20,203	0.03%	0	Samuel H. Friedman	New York	0
Douglas MacArthur	Constitution	Arkansas	17,205	0.03%	0	Harry F. Byrd	Virginia	0
Farrell Dobbs	Socialist Workers	Minnesota	10,312	0.02%	0	Myra Tanner Weiss	California	0
Other			9,039	0.02%	—	Other		—
Total			61,751,942	100%	531			531
Needed to win					266			266

Source (popular vote):

Source (electoral vote): National Archives and Records Administration

Popular vote
Eisenhower	55.18%
Stevenson	44.33%
Others	0.49%

Electoral vote
Eisenhower	83.24%
Stevenson	16.76%

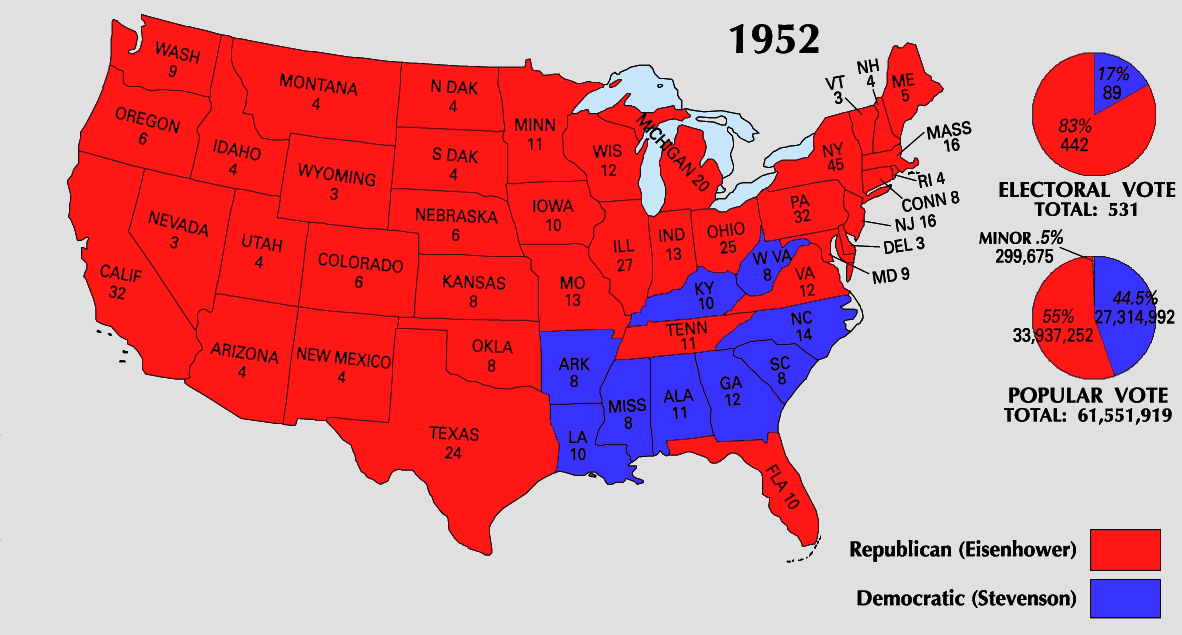

Results by county, shaded according to winning candidate's percentage of the vote

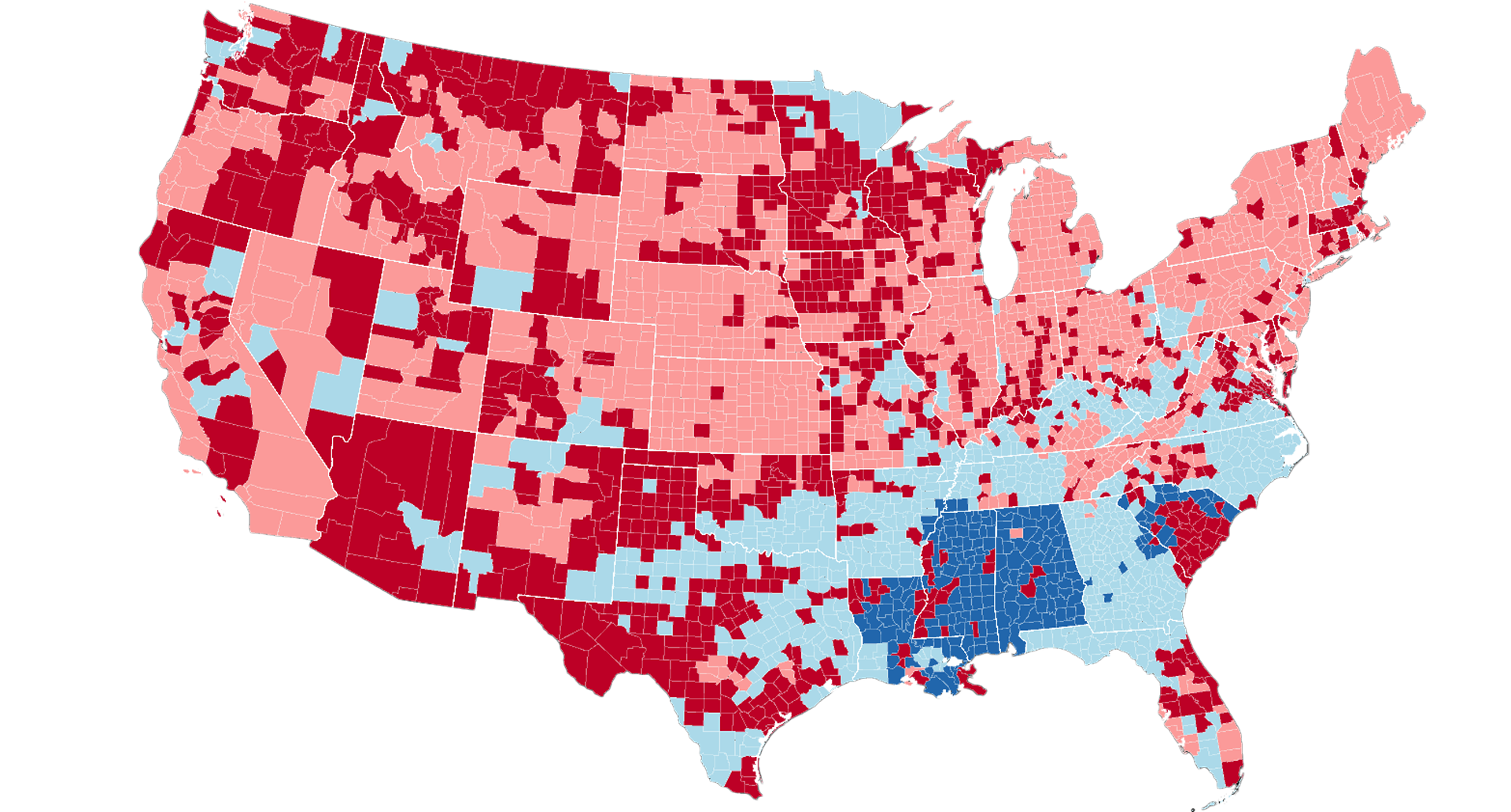
1948-52 Presidential election county flips, dark red indicating GOP flips, dark blue indicating Dem flips, and light shaded colors indicating holds.

Results by congressional district, shaded according to winning candidate's percentage of the vote

=== Results by state ===
States/districts won by Stevenson/Sparkman
States/districts won by Eisenhower/Nixon

		Dwight D. Eisenhower Republican			Adlai Stevenson Democratic			Vincent Hallinan Progressive			Stuart Hamblen Prohibition			Eric Hass Socialist Labor			Margin		State Total	
State	electoral votes	#	%	electoral votes	#	%	electoral votes	#	%	electoral votes	#	%	electoral votes	#	%	electoral votes	#	%	#	
Alabama	11	149,231	35.02	–	275,075	64.55	11	–	–	–	1,814	0.43	–	–	–	–	-125,844	-29.53	426,120	AL
Arizona	4	152,042	58.35	4	108,528	41.65	–	–	–	–	–	–	–	–	–	–	43,514	16.70	260,570	AZ
Arkansas	8	177,155	43.76	–	226,300	55.90	8	–	–	–	886	0.22	–	1	0.00	–	-49,145	-12.14	404,800	AR
California	32	3,035,587	56.83	32	2,257,646	42.27	–	24,692	0.46	–	16,117	0.30	–	273	0.01	–	777,941	14.56	5,341,603	CA
Colorado	6	379,782	60.27	6	245,504	38.96	–	1,919	0.30	–	–	–	–	352	0.06	–	134,278	21.31	630,103	CO
Connecticut	8	611,012	55.70	8	481,649	43.91	–	1,466	0.13	–	–	–	–	535	0.05	–	129,363	11.79	1,096,911	CT
Delaware	3	90,059	51.75	3	83,315	47.88	–	155	0.09	–	234	0.13	–	242	0.14	–	6,744	3.88	174,025	DE
Florida	10	544,036	54.99	10	444,950	44.97	–	–	–	–	–	–	–	–	–	–	99,086	10.02	989,337	FL
Georgia	12	198,979	30.34	–	456,823	69.66	12	–	–	–	–	–	–	–	–	–	-257,844	-39.32	655,803	GA
Idaho	4	180,707	65.42	4	95,081	34.42	–	443	0.16	–	–	–	–	–	–	–	85,626	31.00	276,231	ID
Illinois	27	2,457,327	54.84	27	2,013,920	44.94	–	–	–	–	–	–	–	9,363	0.21	–	443,407	9.90	4,481,058	IL
Indiana	13	1,136,259	58.11	13	801,530	40.99	–	1,222	0.06	–	15,335	0.78	–	979	0.05	–	334,729	17.12	1,955,325	IN
Iowa	10	808,906	63.75	10	451,513	35.59	–	5,085	0.40	–	2,882	0.23	–	139	0.01	–	357,393	28.17	1,268,773	IA
Kansas	8	616,302	68.77	8	273,296	30.50	–	–	–	–	6,038	0.67	–	–	–	–	343,006	38.27	896,166	KS
Kentucky	10	495,029	49.84	–	495,729	49.91	10	336	0.03	–	1,161	0.12	–	893	0.09	–	-700	-0.07	993,148	KY
Louisiana	10	306,925	47.08	–	345,027	52.92	10	–	–	–	–	–	–	–	–	–	-38,102	-5.84	651,952	LA
Maine	5	232,353	66.05	5	118,806	33.77	–	332	0.09	–	–	–	–	156	0.04	–	113,547	32.28	351,786	ME
Maryland	9	499,424	55.36	9	395,337	43.83	–	7,313	0.81	–	–	–	–	–	–	–	104,087	11.54	902,074	MD
Massachusetts	16	1,292,325	54.22	16	1,083,525	45.46	–	4,636	0.19	–	886	0.04	–	1,957	0.08	–	208,800	8.76	2,383,398	MA
Michigan	20	1,551,529	55.44	20	1,230,657	43.97	–	3,922	0.14	–	10,331	0.37	–	1,495	0.05	–	320,872	11.47	2,798,592	MI
Minnesota	11	763,211	55.33	11	608,458	44.11	–	2,666	0.19	–	2,147	0.16	–	2,383	0.17	–	154,753	11.22	1,379,483	MN
Mississippi	8	112,966	39.56	–	172,566	60.44	8	–	–	–	–	–	–	–	–	–	-59,600	-20.87	285,532	MS
Missouri	13	959,429	50.71	13	929,830	49.14	–	987	0.05	–	885	0.05	–	169	0.01	–	29,599	1.56	1,892,062	MO
Montana	4	157,394	59.39	4	106,213	40.07	–	723	0.27	–	548	0.21	–	–	–	–	51,181	19.31	265,037	MT
Nebraska	6	421,603	69.15	6	188,057	30.85	–	–	–	–	–	–	–	–	–	–	233,546	38.31	609,660	NE
Nevada	3	50,502	61.45	3	31,688	38.55	–	–	–	–	–	–	–	–	–	–	18,814	22.89	82,190	NV
New Hampshire	4	166,287	60.92	4	106,663	39.08	–	–	–	–	–	–	–	–	–	–	59,624	21.84	272,950	NH
New Jersey	16	1,374,613	56.81	16	1,015,902	41.99	–	5,589	0.23	–	989	0.04	–	5,815	0.24	–	358,711	14.83	2,419,554	NJ
New Mexico	4	132,170	55.39	4	105,661	44.28	–	225	0.09	–	297	0.12	–	35	0.01	–	26,509	11.11	238,608	NM
New York	45	3,952,815	55.45	45	3,104,601	43.55	–	64,211	0.90	–	–	–	–	1,560	0.02	–	848,214	11.90	7,128,241	NY
North Carolina	14	558,107	46.09	–	652,803	53.91	14	–	–	–	–	–	–	–	–	–	-94,696	-7.82	1,210,910	NC
North Dakota	4	191,712	70.97	4	76,694	28.39	–	344	0.13	–	302	0.11	–	–	–	–	115,018	42.58	270,127	ND
Ohio	25	2,100,391	56.76	25	1,600,367	43.24	–	–	–	–	–	–	–	–	–	–	500,024	13.51	3,700,758	OH
Oklahoma	8	518,045	54.59	8	430,939	45.41	–	–	–	–	–	–	–	–	–	–	87,106	9.18	948,984	OK
Oregon	6	420,815	60.54	6	270,579	38.93	–	3,665	0.53	–	–	–	–	–	–	–	150,236	21.61	695,059	OR
Pennsylvania	32	2,415,789	52.74	32	2,146,269	46.85	–	4,222	0.09	–	8,951	0.20	–	1,377	0.03	–	269,520	5.88	4,580,969	PA
Rhode Island	4	210,935	50.89	4	203,293	49.05	–	187	0.05	–	–	–	–	83	0.02	–	7,642	1.84	414,498	RI
South Carolina	8	168,082	49.28	–	173,004	50.72	8	–	–	–	–	–	–	–	–	–	-4,922	-1.44	341,086	SC
South Dakota	4	203,857	69.27	4	90,426	30.73	–	–	–	–	–	–	–	–	–	–	113,431	38.54	294,283	SD
Tennessee	11	446,147	49.99	11	443,710	49.71	–	885	0.10	–	1,432	0.16	–	–	–	–	2,437	0.27	892,553	TN
Texas	24	1,102,878	53.13	24	969,228	46.69	–	294	0.01	–	1,983	0.10	–	–	–	–	133,650	6.44	2,075,946	TX
Utah	4	194,190	58.93	4	135,364	41.07	–	–	–	–	–	–	–	–	–	–	58,826	17.85	329,554	UT
Vermont	3	109,717	71.45	3	43,355	28.23	–	282	0.18	–	–	–	–	–	–	–	66,362	43.22	153,557	VT
Virginia	12	349,037	56.32	12	268,677	43.36	–	311	0.05	–	–	–	–	1,160	0.19	–	80,360	12.97	619,689	VA
Washington	9	599,107	54.33	9	492,845	44.69	–	2,460	0.22	–	–	–	–	633	0.06	–	106,262	9.64	1,102,708	WA
West Virginia	8	419,970	48.08	–	453,578	51.92	8	–	–	–	–	–	–	–	–	–	-33,608	-3.85	873,548	WV
Wisconsin	12	979,744	60.95	12	622,175	38.71	–	2,174	0.14	–	–	–	–	770	0.05	–	357,569	22.25	1,607,370	WI
Wyoming	3	81,047	62.71	3	47,934	37.09	–	–	–	–	194	0.15	–	36	0.03	–	33,113	25.62	129,251	WY
TOTALS:	531	34,075,529	55.18	442	27,375,090	44.33	89	140,746	0.23	–	73,412	0.12	–	30,406	0.05	–	6,700,439	10.85	61,751,942	US

==== States that flipped from Democratic to Republican ====
- Arizona
- California
- Colorado
- Florida
- Idaho
- Illinois
- Iowa
- Massachusetts
- Minnesota
- Missouri
- Montana
- Nevada
- New Mexico
- Ohio
- Oklahoma
- Rhode Island
- Tennessee
- Texas
- Utah
- Virginia
- Washington
- Wisconsin
- Wyoming

==== States that flipped from Dixiecrat to Democratic ====
- Alabama
- Louisiana
- Mississippi
- South Carolina

=== Close states ===
Election results in these states were within one percentage point (21 electoral votes):

1. Kentucky, 0.07% (700 votes)
2. Tennessee, 0.27% (2,437 votes)

Election results in these states were within five percentage points (36 electoral votes):

1. South Carolina, 1.44% (4,922 votes)
2. Missouri, 1.56% (29,599 votes)
3. Rhode Island, 1.84% (7,642 votes)
4. West Virginia, 3.85% (33,608 votes)
5. Delaware, 3.88% (6,744 votes)

Election results in these states were between five and ten percentage points (140 electoral votes):

1. Louisiana, 5.84% (38,102 votes)
2. Pennsylvania, 5.88% (269,520 votes)
3. Texas, 6.44% (133,650 votes)
4. North Carolina, 7.82% (94,696 votes)
5. Massachusetts, 8.76% (208,800 votes)
6. Oklahoma, 9.18% (87,106 votes)
7. Washington, 9.64% (106,262 votes)
8. Illinois, 9.90% (443,407 votes)

Tipping point state:

1. Michigan, 11.47% (320,872 votes)

==== Statistics ====
Counties with Highest Percent of Vote (Republican)

1. Plaquemines Parish, Louisiana 92.97%
2. Gillespie County, Texas 92.29%
3. McIntosh County, North Dakota 90.89%
4. Campbell County, South Dakota 90.14%
5. Kenedy County, Texas 88.52%

Counties with Highest Percent of Vote (Democratic)

1. Greene County, North Carolina 94.12%
2. Hart County, Georgia 94.08%
3. Treutlen County, Georgia 93.34%
4. Martin County, North Carolina 92.98%
5. Walton County, Georgia 91.89%

== See also ==
- 1952 United States House of Representatives elections
- 1952 United States Senate elections
- History of the United States (1945–1964)
- First inauguration of Dwight D. Eisenhower
- 1952 Progressive National Convention
- 1951 Prohibition National Convention
- 1952 Socialist Labor National Convention
