= Eric Hass =

American politician (1905–1980)

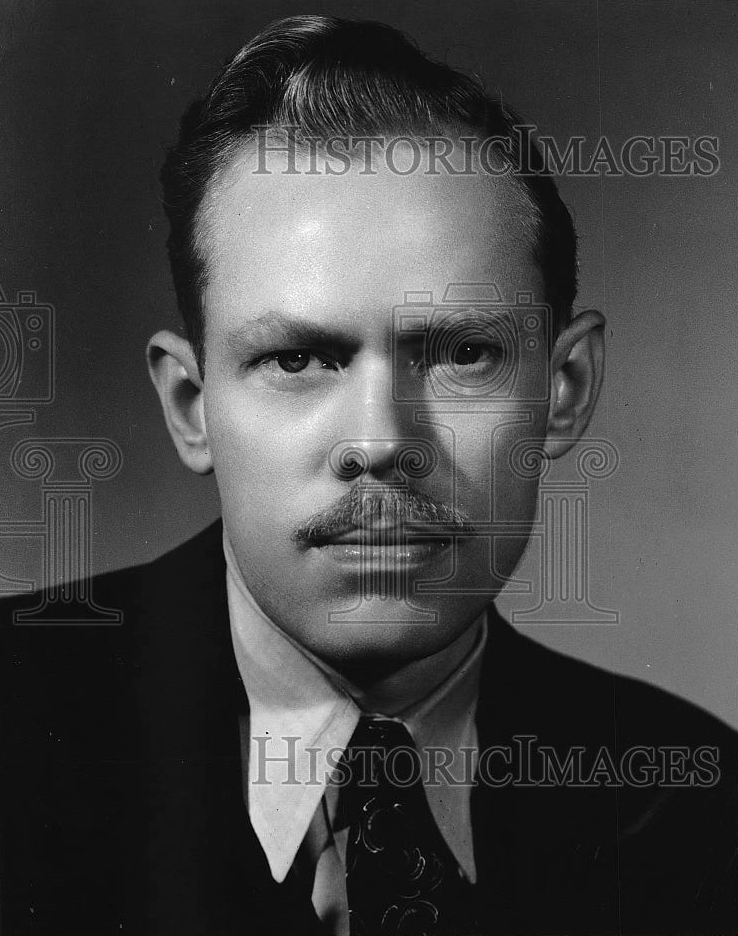
- Hass in 1952
- Born: March 4, 1905; Lincoln, Nebraska, U.S.
- Died: October 2, 1980 (aged 75); Santa Rosa, California, U.S.
- Occupation: Politician
- Political party: Socialist Labor

Eric Hass (March 4, 1905 – October 2, 1980) was a four-time Socialist Labor candidate for President of the United States.

== Life ==
Hass was of German and Danish ancestry, and was born in Lincoln, Nebraska, in 1905. He died of a heart attack in Community Hospital, Santa Rosa, California, on October 2, 1980.

== State elections ==
In 1942, he ran for New York State Attorney General.

In 1944, he ran for U.S. Senator from New York.

In 1950, 1958 and 1962, he ran for Governor of New York.

== Presidential elections ==
In 1952, his running mate was Stephen Emery; in 1956 and 1960, Georgia Cozzini; and in 1964, Henning A. Blomen. He came in third place in 1964.

Hass was also a prolific author on topics dealing with socialism and one of the SLP's more influential members.

== Bibliography ==
- John L. Lewis Exposed (1937)
- The Socialist industrial unionism the workers' power (1941)
- Labor Draft: Step To Industrial Slavery (1943)
- The Americanism of Socialism (1944)
- Stalinist Imperialism: the social and economic forces behind Russian expansion (1946)
- The Socialist Labor Party and the Internationals (1949)
- Dave Beck, labor merchant. The case history of a labor leader (1955)
- Militarism Labor's Foe! (1955)
- What workers should know about automation ...and what employers don't tell them (1957)
- The Reactionary Right: Incipient Fascism (1966)

== See also ==
- Georgia Cozzini

Preceded by Edward A. Teichert	Socialist Labor Party presidential candidate 1952, 1956, 1960, 1964	Succeeded by Henning A. Blomen
