= Edward A. Teichert =

American laborer and political activist

Edward August Teichert (November 14, 1903 in Pennsylvania – August 1981) was an American laborer and political activist. Teichert, from Greensburg, Pennsylvania, was the Socialist Labor Party of America's nominee for President of the United States twice (1944 and 1948).

At the time of his 1948 nomination, Teichert worked as an assistant foreman in a Greensburg electrical equipment plant.

In 1944, Teichert ran on the ticket with Arla A. Albaugh as the vice-presidential nominee. Teichert/Albaugh were on 15 state ballots and received 45,188 votes, the most the party's presidential nominee had earned since 1900. The Communist Party USA chose not to run a candidate for president in that year.

In 1948, Teichert and vice-presidential nominee Stephen Emery were on 22 state ballots and received 29,244 votes. Teichert was forced to run on the "Industrial Government Party" in his home state of Pennsylvania due to state law prohibiting the use of the same word in two party names. Norman Thomas and the Socialist Party of America got on the ballot first in that state.
