= Stephen Emery =

American political activist

Stephen Emery was an American subway dispatcher and political activist from New York. He was twice the vice-presidential nominee of the Socialist Labor Party of America in 1948 and 1952. Running alongside Edward A. Teichert in 1948, the SLP ticket received 29,244 votes in 22 states. Four years later in 1952, Emery was nominated alongside Eric Hass. Hass/Emery received 30,406 votes.

In April 1970, Emery was nominated to be the SLP's candidate for Governor of New York. At the time of nomination, he lived in Jamaica, Queens, New York City. He won 3,963 votes to finish in last place among six candidates.

== Published works ==
- Stephen Emery, member of the Socialist Labor Party of America Letter to Albert Einstein The Weekly People, 1949
