= Fannia Cohn =

Belarusian-born Jewish American trade union educator (1885-1962)

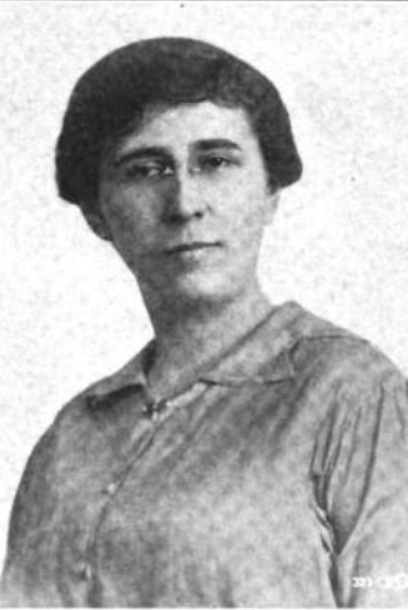
- Fannia Cohn, from a 1915 publication
- Born: May 5, 1885; Kletsk, Belarus
- Died: December 24, 1962 (aged 77); New York, New York, US
- Occupations: Labor organizer, union leader

Fannia Mary Cohn (April 5, 1885 – December 24, 1962) was a leading figure in the International Ladies' Garment Workers' Union (ILGWU) during the first half of the 20th century. She is remembered as one of the pioneers of the workers' education movement in the United States and as a prolific author on the theme of trade union education.

== Biography ==
=== Early years ===
Fannia Mary Cohn was born on April 5, 1885, to an ethnic Jewish family in Kletsk, Belarus, then part of the Russian Empire. She was the fourth of five children of a successful owner of a flour mill and his wife. Fannia received an education in private schools, with her parents encouraging their daughter to read extensively.

Cohn was radicalized during her teenaged years in the Tsarist empire. At the age of 16 she joined the Socialist Revolutionary Party (PSR), the intellectual successor of the Narodnik movement of the 1870s. She was active in the Minsk section of the PSR, a secret revolutionary political party, for the next three years.

=== Emigration to America ===
In 1904 her brother was nearly killed in an anti-Jewish pogrom, spurring Fannia to emigrate to the United States. Arriving in New York City, Cohn soon joined the Socialist Party of America. Cohn decided against further formal education in 1905, instead taking a job as a garment worker in order to participate directly in the Yiddish-language labor movement of New York City.

In 1906 Fannia began her efforts to organize workers in the white goods trade. Organizing this particular trade was difficult because workers within it were of various nationalities and spoke different languages. During a 1908 strike of household linen makers, Cohn met Rose Schneiderman, with whom she became closely associated. Both Cohn and Schneiderman believed in the efficacy of recruiting female strike leaders from the union rank-and-file rather than relying upon a male-dominated centralized union bureaucracy for the settlement of labor disputes. They employed this outlook to bridge the ethnic gaps amongst worker in the white goods trade, finding a leader amongst the women of different ethnicities who could speak to the workers in their own language and cultivating her organizing talents. This strategy was successful and by 1909 the International Ladies' Garment Workers' Union (ILGWU) recognized the white goods' worker's union.

Fannia helped to organize Local 24 of the ILGWU in Brooklyn and was elected to the Executive Board of the local in 1909 at the young age of 24. She was elected Chair of the Executive Board in 1913 and remained in that position until 1914. During the years 1912 and 1913 Cohn played a prominent role as a leader of the strike movement of New York City's organized garment workers.

In 1914 the National Women's Trade Union League (NWTUL), an organization established in 1903, launched a training school for women organizers, a year-long program combining academics and field work. New York ILGWU leader Cohn was one of the first three chosen to attend the program in Chicago. In 1915, she was asked by the International Ladies' Garment Workers' Union to organize Chicago dressmakers and in doing so founded ILGWU Local No. 59. In connection with this activity, Cohn was a key leader of a major strike of Chicago garment workers which began late in 1915 and continued into the following year, serving as a general organizer for the ILGWU.

In 1916 Cohn was elected as the first female vice president of the ILGWU. She would serve in this capacity until 1925.

=== Workers' education ===
In 1918 Cohn took the leadership of the ILGWU's Education Committee, and eventually rose to become Vice President of the union. After being elected as the first female vice president of ILGWU, Fannia Cohn continued to pioneer and promote an image of the labor movement that integrated education as well as personal growth. Cohn, soon after her promotion, lobbied for the establishment of an Education Department within the union and subsequently, served as secretary upon its launch.

In the wake of this new educational reform, women within the union began to militantly mobilize due to their growing discontent with the ILGWU leadership and in turn, jumpstarted a rebellion that consequently crippled the union’s infrastructure. As a result, Fannia Cohn would be blamed for this rebellion as well as her failure to condemn it and would thus be castigated and ostracized from all fronts – including the militants she inspired. Cut off by union leaders, Cohn later channelled her activism into education, as she fostered some of the country's prominent scholars as allies and even teachers in her workers education courses.

Cohn was instrumental in the formation of the Workers' Education Bureau of America in 1921.

Cohn was a co-founder of Brookwood Labor College in 1924, an initiative associated with labor educator A. J. Muste. She would serve as a director of Brookwood until 1933, also sitting on the board of Brookwood's Labor Publication Society, publisher of the magazine Labor Age. In 1932 Cohn was named a vice president of Brookwood Labor College, a position in which she remained until 1937. During her time at Brookwood, Cohn served as a mentor to Floria Pinkney, the first African-American labor organizer in the ILGWU.

=== Conferences and political activity ===
Fannia Cohn was selected as an American delegate to the International Women's Conference held in Washington, D.C., in 1919. She was also a delegate to the 1st International Conference on Workers' Education, held in Brussels, Belgium in 1922. She served in a similar capacity at the 2nd International Conference on Workers' Education, held in Oxford, England, in 1924.

In 1924 Cohn became active in the Conference for Progressive Political Action (CPPA), a group envisioned as an umbrella organization of progressive political and trade union activists leading towards the establishment of a labor party in the United States. Cohn was elected a member of the National Committee of the CPPA. Despite the failure of that organization to survive beyond 1925, Cohn remained active in left wing politics at least through the 1940s as a member of the League for Industrial Democracy.

=== Death and legacy ===
Fannia Cohn retired from trade union affairs in 1961. She died in New York City on December 24, 1962. She was 77 years old at the time of her death.

== Works ==
- The Educational Work of the International Ladies' Garment Workers' Union: Report Submitted to the Conference of the Worker's Education Bureau of America, April 2, 1921. New York : Educational Dept., International Ladies' Garment Workers' Union, [1921].
- Report of First International Conference on Workers' Education held in Brussels, Belgium, August 16th and 17th, 1922. With Spencer Miller. New York: Workers Education Bureau of America, n.d. [c. 1922].
- Winning Workingmen to Unionism. New York: International Ladies' Garment Workers' Union, n.d. [1920s].
- Woman's Eternal Struggle: What Workers Education Will Do for Woman. New York: Educational Department, International Ladies' Garment Workers' Union, n.d. [c. 1932].
- The Uprising of the Sixty Thousand: The General Strike of the Dressmakers' Union, August 16, 1933. New York: International Ladies' Garment Workers' Union, n.d. [1933].
- A New Era Opens for Labor Education: Discussion at the Workers' Education Bureau Conference, October 2, 1933, Washington, DC. New York: Workers Education Bureau of America, n.d. [1933].
- Social Responsibility. New York: Educational Department, International Ladies' Garment Workers' Union, n.d. [c 1933].
- Workers' Education and Labor Leadership. New York: Workers Education Bureau of America, 1935.
- Can Women Lead? New York: n.p., 1936.
- Working Women in Action. New York: n.p., 1936.
- We Kept Our Faith: A Memorial to Our Triangle Victims. New York: n.p., 1936.
- Action Based on Knowledge is Power. New York: Educational Department, International Ladies' Garment Workers' Union, n.d. [c. 1936].
- The Workers Education Bureau — An Arm of the Labor Movement. New York: Workers Education Bureau, n.d. [c. 1936].
- Method and Approach in a Discussion of the Economics of the Garment Industry for Young Workers. New York: n.p., 1937.
- History: Fiction or Fact: What is Workers' Education, Including Suggestions for Teachers in Workers' Classes. New York: Educational Department, International Ladies' Garment Workers' Union, 1938.
- Progressives Must Choose. New York: Educational Department, International Ladies' Garment Workers' Union, n.d. [c. 1938].
- Why is Our Union Different? New York: Educational Department, International Ladies' Garment Workers' Union, 1939.
- Workers' Education in the World Crisis: A Discussion at the Annual Conference of the American Association for Adult Education on May 21, 1940, at the Hotel Astor, New York. New York: American Association for Adult Education, 1940.
- Workers' Education in War and Peace. New York: Workers Education Bureau of America, 1943.
- Facing the Future: Where Do We Go from Here? ... New York: Educational Department, International Ladies' Garment Workers' Union, 1945.
- Labor Unions and the Community. New York: Workers Education Bureau of America, 1946.
- Organized Labor's Contribution to the Nation. New York: Educational Department, International Ladies' Garment Workers' Union, 1946.
- UNESCO: Its Objectives and How to Implement Them. New York: Educational Department, International Ladies' Garment Workers' Union, 1947.
- Learn - Play - Act: A Program of Progressive Workers' Education. New York: Educational Department, International Ladies' Garment Workers' Union, 1947.
- Philosophy of Workers' Education. n.c.: n.p., n.d. [c. 1948].
- Workers' Education: The Dream and the Reality. New York: Educational Department, International Ladies' Garment Workers' Union, 1948.
- Adult Labor Education in a Troubled World: A Guide for Teachers. New York: International Ladies' Garment Workers' Union, 1958.
- Why Workers' Education? Los Angeles: n.p., n.d.
