= William Fincke =

American football player and pacifist minister

Profile
- Position: Halfback

Personal information
- Born: January 1, 1878; New York, New York, U.S.
- Died: May 31, 1927 (aged 49); New York, New York, U.S.

Career information
- High school: The Hill School
- College: Yale (1899–1900)

Awards and highlights
- National champion (1900); Consensus All-American (1900)

William Mann Fincke (January 1, 1878 – May 31, 1927) was an American football player, pacifist minister, and educator. He played college football for the Yale Bulldogs football team and was selected as a consensus All-American in 1900. He later became a Presbyterian minister, pacifist, and proponent of the social gospel. Along with his wife, Helen, he founded both the Brookwood Labor College and the Manumit School.

== Early life ==
Fincke was born in New York City in 1878. His father, William Mann Fincke, was a businessman. His step-brother was Lincoln Ellsworth. Fincke attended preparatory school at The Hill School in Pottstown, Pennsylvania. He graduated from The Hill School in 1897.

Fincke enrolled at Yale University, where he played football in 1899 and 1900. He was also a member of Yale's track team for three years and the captain of the track team during his senior year. In 1900, he was selected as a consensus All-American while playing at the quarterback position for the undefeated Yale Bulldogs football team. Fincke was a member of the Fraternity of Delta Psi fraternity (St. Anthony Hall) while attending Yale. He was also a class deacon and the chairman of the Class Supper Committee. He graduated from Yale's Sheffield Scientific School in 1901 with a Ph.B. degree.

== Career ==
=== Business ===
Fincke worked for Ellsworth & Company, a Lake Erie ferry service owned by his father. In the position, he was involved in shipping coal to the factories of the Great Lakes region. After several years with Ellsworth & Company, he served from 1906 to 1907 as the general manager of the Pennsylvania-Ontario Transportation Company in Woodstock, Ontario. During this time, Fincke reportedly "lost interest in industrial management and was troubled by capitalism's exploitation of the laboring class."

=== Seminary and ministry ===
In 1908, Fincke next enrolled at the Union Theological Seminary. While enrolled at the seminary, became critical of the church's traditional role and its relationship to wealth and studied the works of Walter Rauschenbusch and Washington Gladden, who advocated the social gospel. After graduating from the seminary in 1911, Fincke served as assistant pastor of the Madison Avenue Presbyterian Church in New York. From 1912 to 1917, he was the pastor of the Greenwich Presbyterian Church in lower Manhattan. In April 1917, Fincke's congregation voted to remove him as pastor after he delivered a pacifist sermon rejecting the belief that World War I, which the United States had recently joined, was a fight for liberty and democracy.

=== World War I ===
In 1917, Fincke enlisted in the United States Army Medical Corps. The ship on which he sailed to Europe was sunk by a German U-boat, but he was rescued. In France, he served as a stretcher-bearer and with the Presbyterian Hospital Unit. He served in Europe from May 1917 to January 1918.

=== Post-war activism and educational efforts ===
After the war, Fincke became active in the Labor Temple in New York City. He was the acting director of the New York Labor Temple from April 1918 to June 1919. The Labor Temple was affiliated with the Presbyterian Church and offered social, religious and educational programs for the city's working class. During the Steel strike of 1919, Fincke traveled to Duquesne, Pennsylvania, as part of the Fellowship of Reconciliation. He led a fight for the free speech rights of striking steel workers and was briefly imprisoned on a charge of disturbing the peace.

In 1919, Fincke established an experimental boarding school on the former Brookwood Estate in Katonah, New York. Fincke had purchased the estate in 1914, and his wife and family lived in the estate. He converted the main house into an experimental school and dormitory for teen-aged workers from the "needle trades" in New York City and farms in the lower Hudson Valley. Fincke was assisted at Brookwood by Fellowship of Reconciliation activists, including peace activist John Nevin Sayre, Socialist Party leader Norman Thomas, and labor economist Robert W. Dunn. Courses at the college included "The Literature of Revolt," "The History of Workers in America," and "Social and Economic Problems of Today." Students at the college were not charged tuition, and the operating costs were funded in part by Fincke's personal wealth. In 1921, the school became the Brookwood Labor College, the first residential labor college in the United States.

In 1922, Fincke ended his involvement with Brookwood. Along with his wife, Helen, he moved to a farm in Pawling, New York. On the farm, he and his wife established the Manumit School, a co-educational boarding school referred to as a "laborers' peace school for young children." Manumit was also described as "an alliance of progressive labor and progressive education" and was associated with a number of New York City labor unions.

== Personal life ==
In 1927, at age 49, Fincke died of lymphatic leukemia at St. Luke's Hospital in New York City. He was buried at Manumit School.
