= Darlington Hoopes =

American politician (1896–1989)

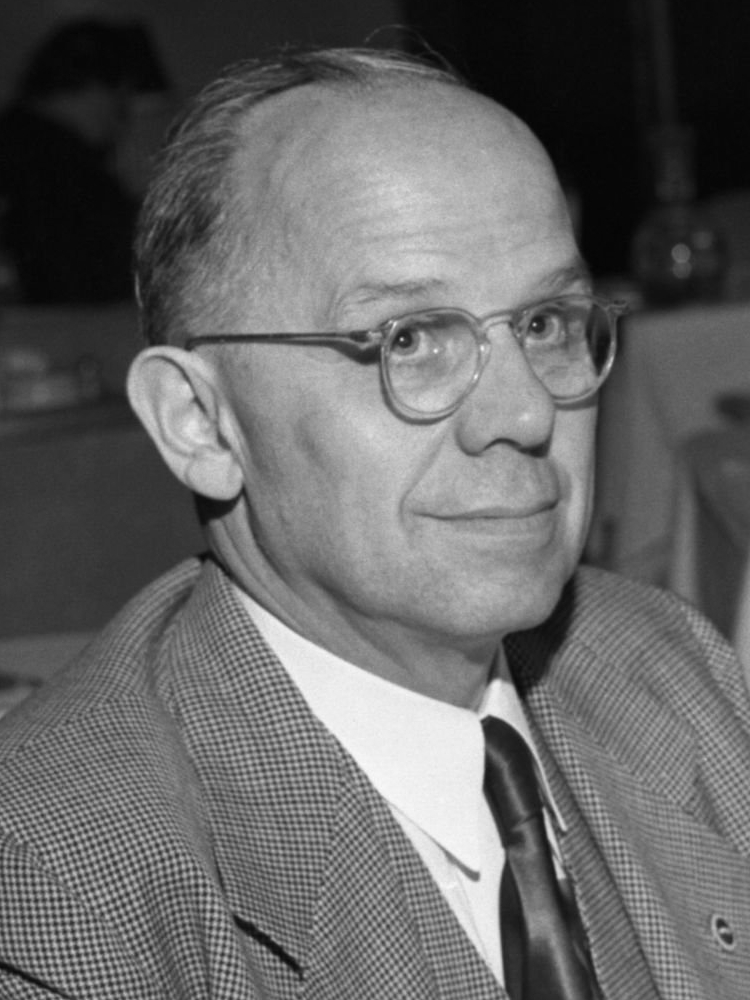
- Hoopes in 1952

National Chairman of the Socialist Party of America
- In office June 2, 1946 – July 7, 1968
- Preceded by: Maynard C. Krueger
- Succeeded by: Michael Harrington

Member of the Pennsylvania House of Representatives from the Berks County district
- In office January 6, 1931 – January 5, 1937
- Preceded by: Multi-member district
- Succeeded by: Multi-member district

Personal details
- Born: September 11, 1896 LaVale, Maryland, U.S.
- Died: September 25, 1989 (aged 93) Sinking Spring, Pennsylvania, U.S.
- Party: Socialist Party of America; Social Democratic Federation; Socialist Party USA
- Spouse: Hazelette Miller
- Children: 3
- Education: University of Wisconsin School of Agriculture

Darlington Hoopes (September 11, 1896 – September 25, 1989) was an American politician and lawyer who served in the Pennsylvania House of Representatives as a member of the Socialist Party of America. He served as chairman of the Socialist Party of America from 1946 to 1968.

Hoopes was born in LaVale, Maryland, and educated at the George School and the University of Wisconsin School of Agriculture. He ran for multiple offices with the Socialist nomination and served in multiple position within the Socialist Party; with him later becoming chairman of the party.

He served as the Socialist Party's vice-presidential nominee during the 1944 presidential election and as the party's presidential nominee during the 1952 and 1956 presidential elections. Hoopes conducted the last presidential campaigns of the Socialist Party of America. He briefly joined the Social Democratic Federation in the 1930s before returning to the Socialist Party and later joined the Socialist Party USA after the dissolution of the Socialist Party.

== Early life ==
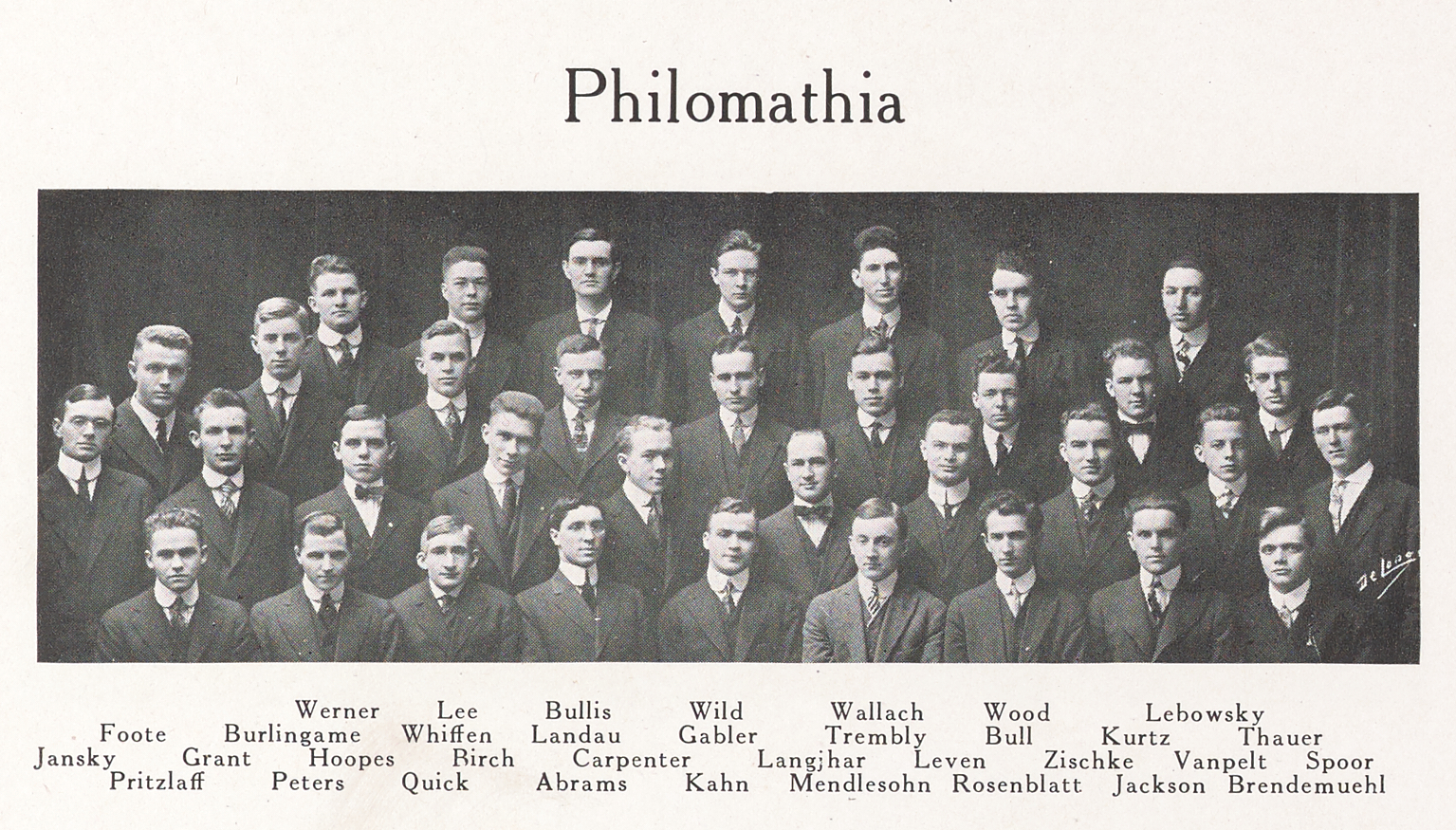
Hoopes (second row from bottom, third from left) with other members of the Philomathia Society at the University of Wisconsin–Madison, 1916

Darlington Hoopes was born on September 11, 1896, in LaVale, Maryland, to Quaker parents. He graduated from the George School in 1913, and attended the University of Wisconsin School of Agriculture. He was admitted to the Pennsylvania Bar Association in 1921. He married Hazelette Miller, with whom he had three children.

== Career ==
=== Early and party politics ===
Hoopes ran to be the Judge of the Court of Common Pleas in Berks County, Pennsylvania, with the Socialist nomination in 1927, 1929, and 1957. From 1928 to 1932, he served as Assistant City Solicitor of Reading and then as City Solicitor of Reading from 1936 to 1940. He served as the Socialist nominee for Governor of Pennsylvania during the 1946 elections.

Hoopes became a member of the Socialist Party of America in 1914. During the 1920s he served as secretary of the Socialist Party of Pennsylvania. Hoopes served as a member of the national Socialist executive committee during the 1930s. Hoopes was selected to serve as the chairman of the Socialist Party of America's 1934 national convention by a vote of 69 to 61 against George E. Roewer. He served as chairman of the Socialist Party of America from 1946 to 1968. Hoopes joined the Socialist Party USA in 1973.

In 1936, the Socialist Party of Pennsylvania severed its connection with the Socialist Party of America over ideological and tactical differences. Hoopes remained with the state organization outside of any national organization. On February 7, 1937, the Socialist Party of Pennsylvania called an "Eastern States Conference of Social Democratic Organizations" in Philadelphia which moved forward towards establishing a new organization, the Social Democratic Federation. Hoopes was named to the 7 member committee which issued a call for a National Convention in Pittsburgh, to be held May 29–31, 1937.

=== Pennsylvania House of Representatives ===
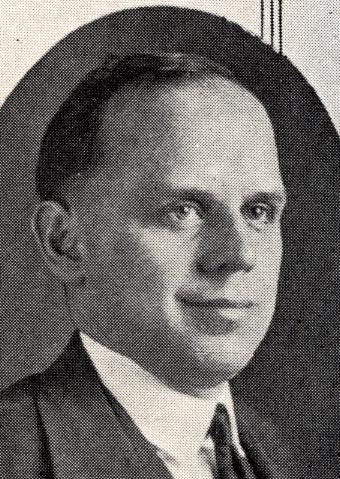
Hoopes during his time in the Pennsylvania House of Representatives.

Hoopes won election to the Pennsylvania House of Representatives in 1930, with the Socialist nomination alongside fellow Socialist Lilith M. Wilson. Hoopes and Wilson were the first third party delegation to serve in the Pennsylvania House of Representatives since 1917. During the 1930 campaign Hoopes had been arrested for attempting to conduct a political meeting without a permit, but the charges against him were later dropped. He was reelected to the Pennsylvania House of Representatives in 1932 and 1934. Hoopes ran for reelection in 1936, but lost in the general election. Hoopes sought election to the Pennsylvania House of Representatives in 1938, but lost.

=== Presidential and vice-presidential campaigns ===
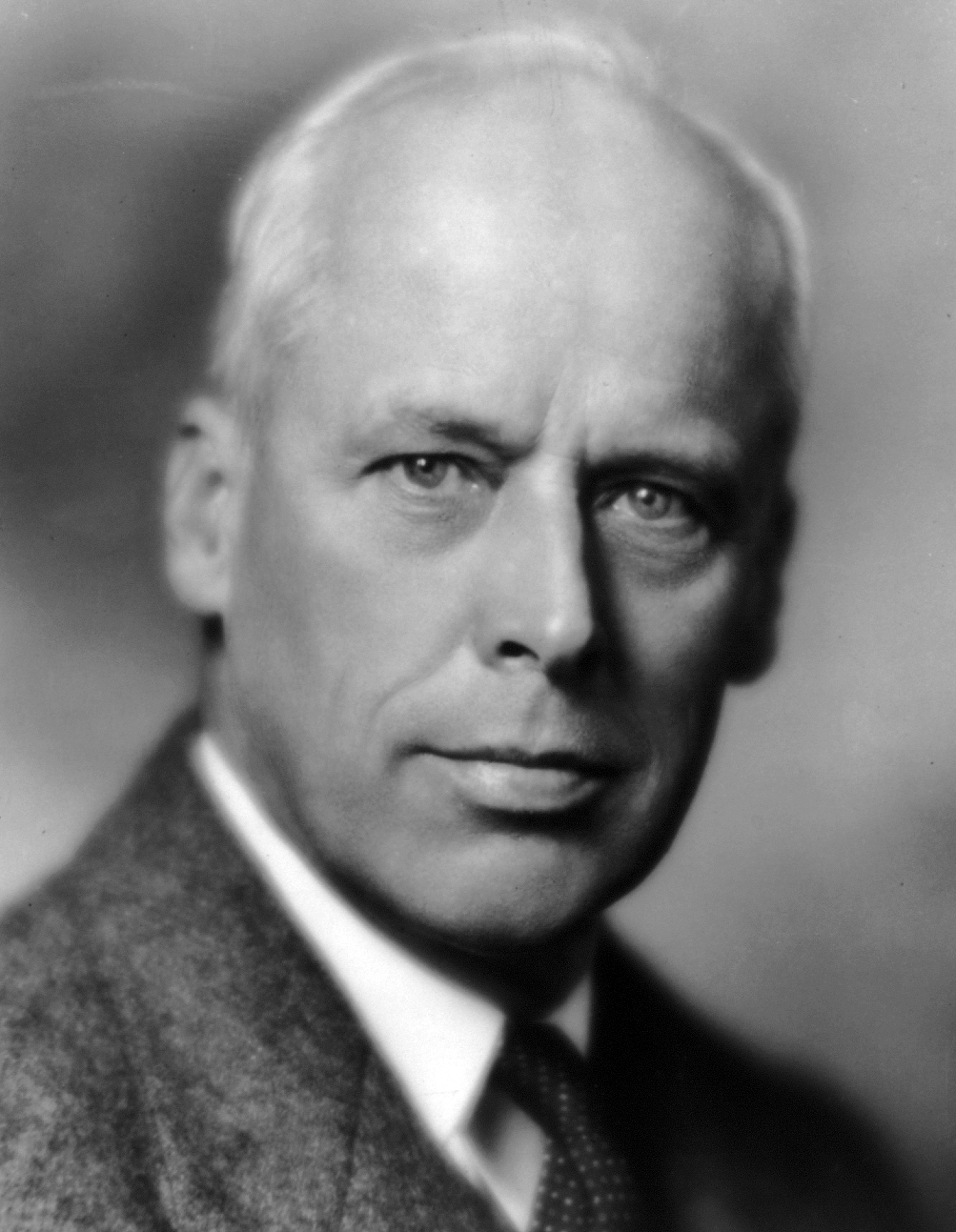
Darlington Hoopes served as Norman Thomas' vice-presidential running mate during the 1944 presidential election.

On June 4, 1944, Hoopes was selected unanimously as the vice-presidential running mate to Norman Thomas, who was seeking the presidency for the fifth time. The Thomas and Hoopes presidential ticket placed fourth in the general election and received 79,019 votes. During the 1948 presidential election Hoopes was endorsed for the vice-presidency by the Socialist Party of Pennsylvania. However, Tucker P. Smith won the party's vice-presidential nomination at the national convention.

On May 5, 1952, the Socialist Party of Massachusetts endorsed Hoopes for the Socialist Party of America's presidential nomination and Robin Myers for the vice-presidential nomination. Hoopes won the party's presidential nomination on a unanimous vote after his two opponents dropped out and Samuel H. Friedman was selected unanimously as his vice-presidential running mate. Hoopes was chosen as the party's presidential nominee after Thomas announced that he would not seek the party's presidential nomination again. During the campaign Hoopes spent $150 and in the general election he placed sixth after receiving 20,203 votes. He was the last member of the Socialist Party to appear on the ballot in Maine until a candidate of the Socialist Party USA appeared on the ballot for a seat in the Maine Senate in the 2018 election.

Hoopes and Friedman were selected as the party's presidential and vice-presidential nominees during the 1956 presidential election. However, the sixty delegates to the Socialist Party of America's national convention chose not to spend large amounts of money or effort on campaigning for president and would instead seek write-in votes for Hoopes and Friedman. In the general election he placed tenth after receiving 2,128 votes. Hoopes' 1956 presidential campaign was the last conducted by the Socialist Party of America before its dissolution in the 1970s.

== Later life ==
From 1957 to 1962, Hoopes served as president of the Pennsylvania Equal Rights Council. He also served as president of the Berks County Bar Association from 1961 to 1962. On September 25, 1989, Hoopes died in a nursing home in Sinking Spring, Pennsylvania of natural causes.

Party political offices
| Preceded by Norman Thomas | Socialist Party presidential candidate 1952 (lost), 1956 (lost) | Succeeded by Frank Zeidler (1976) |
| Preceded by Maynard C. Krueger | Socialist Party of America vice presidential candidate 1944 (lost) | Succeeded by Tucker P. Smith |
