= Manumit School =

Progressive Christian socialist boarding school

Information
- Established: 1924
- Closed: 1958
- Gender: Mixed

The Manumit School was a progressive Christian socialist boarding school located in Pawling, New York, from 1924 to 1943, and in Bristol, Pennsylvania, from 1944 to 1958.

Founded on purchased farmland by the Rev. William Fincke and his wife Helen, it was originally called The Manumit School for Workers' Children. Its curriculum provided a progressive "workers' education" focus during a time of growing socialist optimism in America. Sarah Norcliffe Cleghorn worked there as an English and Drama teacher until 1929.

== History ==
In 1924, the Rev. William Mann Fincke and his wife, Helen Hamlin, founded Manumit as a co-educational boarding school for elementary-level students on a working farm in Pawling, New York. The school was closely associated with several New York City labor unions. A. J. Muste served as Chair of the Manumit Associates/Board for several years. The name "Manumit" is derived from a Latin word meaning "set forth from the hand"; in English, to "manumit" means to release a slave from slavery.

In 1926, Henry R. Linville became interim director following the illness of Mr. Fincke who died in 1927. In the 1927/28 academic year, Nellie M. Seeds, wife of Scott Nearing, became director. In 1933, William Mann Fincke's son, William, and his wife, Mildred Gignoux, became co-directors. By this time, the school was facing significant financial difficulties, with only a few students remaining and concerns about whether the school's focus on political and social ideas was affecting the students' welfare.

In 1938/39, the Progressive Schools' Committee for Refugee Children was formed under the leadership of Mildred and William Fincke, and at least 23 Jewish refugee children attended Manumit. In 1942, the school added its first two years of high school to its elementary curriculum. In 1943, William I. Stephenson became director while William Fincke attended Yale University to pursue a doctorate. On October 25, 1943, a fire destroyed the major school building, the “Mill,” along with most of the school's records.

In 1944, William M. Fincke resumed the directorship with his wife, Amelia Evans. The school was relocated to Bristol, Bensalem Township, Bucks County, Pennsylvania. In 1947, Benjamin C.G. Fincke, son of the founders, and his wife, Magdalene (“Magda”) Joslyn, became co-directors. In 1949, the school added the final two years of high school. In 1950, the school adopted a "work project" experiment. The first full high school graduation took place in 1951. Between 1950 and 1957, there were between 43 and 52 graduates annually. Of the 42 on a list, 29 attended colleges, 3 attended art schools, and 1 attended a technical school.

In 1954, Benjamin Fincke resigned. John A. Lindlof, a former student and teacher at Bristol, became Co-Director. In the mid-1950s, 14% of the student body was Black, and 8% was of Asian descent. In 1956, external attacks on the school began, including fire hazard inspections. Local political manipulations were suspected due to recent housing projects surrounding the school and objections to its interracial status.

In 1957/58, the school was closed following the denial of license renewal for 1958 by the State Board of Private Academic Schools, Pennsylvania Department of Public Instruction. Subsequently, school records were destroyed. The Board inspector had repeatedly singled out the school for complaints, raising suspicions of prejudice against its integrated nature. William Mann Fincke died on January 4, 1968, in Stonington, Connecticut, where he had been teaching remedial reading since 1963.

== Notable students ==
- Sarah Norcliffe Cleghorn (February 4, 1876 – April 4, 1959) was an educator, author, social reformer, and poet.
- Frank Conroy, author (Stop-Time: A Memoir, 1967).
- John Herald, American folk and bluegrass musician.
- Madeline Kahn, actress/comedian ("She told me that every artistic bone in her body was born at Manumit" – Sue Simmons).
- Lee Marvin, actor.
- Susan Oliver, actress, director, and aviator.
- Robert Morse, actor (Mad Men, How to Succeed in Business Without Really Trying).

== Sources ==
- Scott Walter, “Labor's Demonstration School: The Manumit School for Workers' Children, 1924-1932,” 1998. typescript, 26 pp. (ERIC: ED473025)
- History of Manumit by Scott Walter
- Manumit School Archive, New York University, Tamiment Library
- Manumit School website
  - Revision of the site has eliminated some of the quoted material.
- Much of Wikipedia posting by Mike Speer, former Manumit student, 1945-49.

== See also ==
- Henry Linville
