= Samuel H. Friedman =

American socialist political candidate (c.1897–1990)

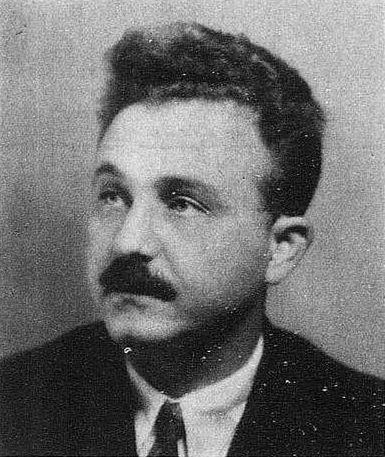
- Friedman in 1933

Personal details
- Born: c. 1897
- Died: March 17, 1990 (aged 93) The Bronx, New York City, US
- Party: Socialist
- Occupation: Journalist, public relations agent, trade unionist

Samuel H. Friedman (c. 1897 – March 17, 1990) was an American socialist political candidate. A member of the Socialist Party of America, he twice ran for Vice President of the United States, among other offices. He never won, instead working as a journalist, public relations agent, and trade unionist.

== Early life and education ==
Friedman was born c. 1897. He lived in Brooklyn and Manhattan. He studied at the City College of New York, and was editor-in-chief of its magazine, the College Mercury. In 1917, in his senior year, he was suspended from the school for one month after publishing an article defending pacifism and criticizing college president Sidney Edward Mezes. Despite the suspension, he received his diploma in June of the same year. He subsequently earned a master's degree from Columbia University.

== Career ==
Friedman served in World War I. A journalist, he wrote for The New Leader, the New York Call, and Women's Wear Daily, as well as working for publisher Fairchild Fashion Media. He was also a high school english and history teacher, public relations agent, and trade unionist. As a trade unionist, he lectured the Amalgamated Clothing Workers of America and the International Ladies Garment Workers Union. He was a member of the American Newspaper Guild and the Teachers Guild.

=== Politics ===
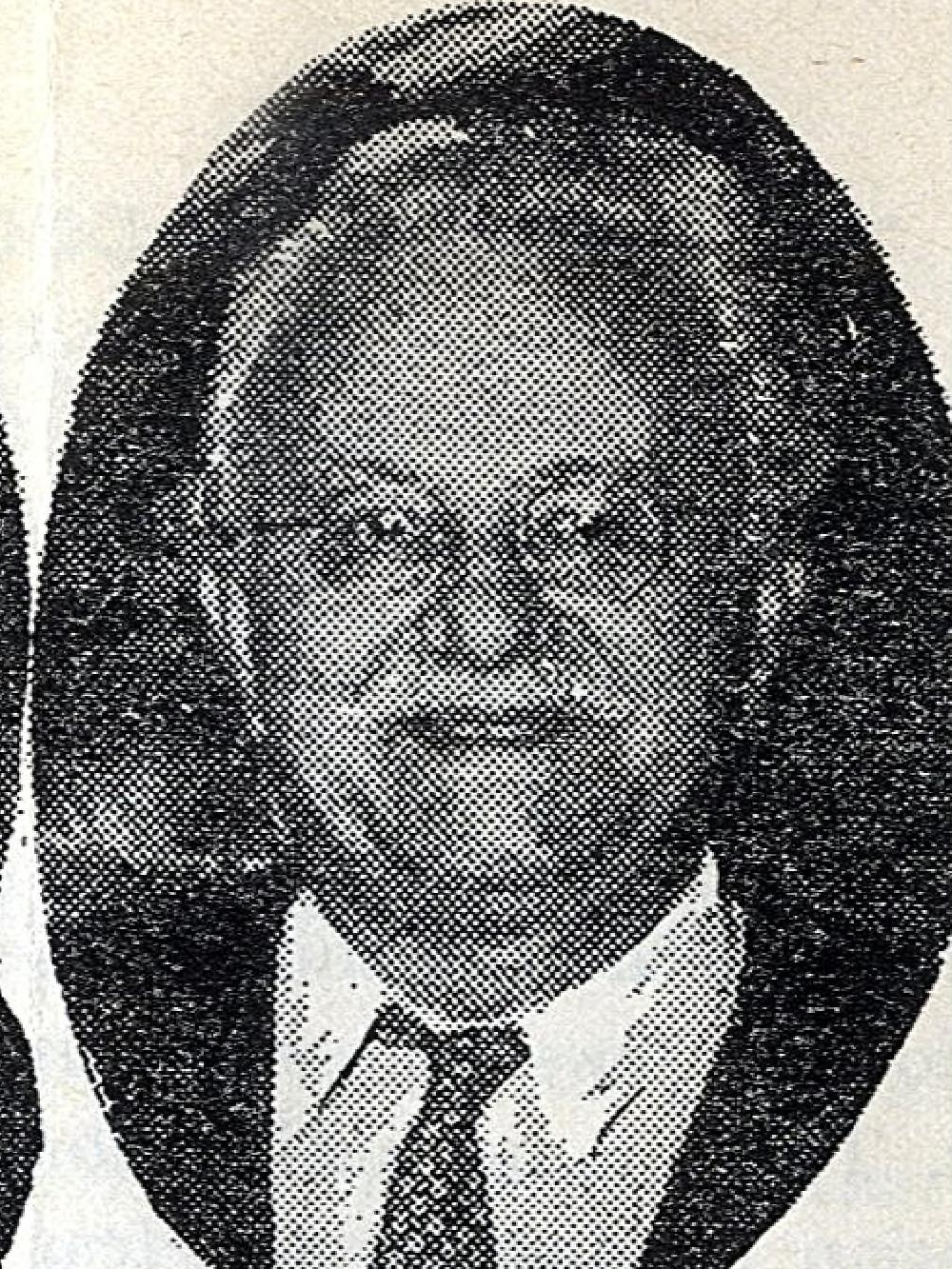
Friedman in 1957

Friedman was a member of the Socialist Party of America, serving as chairman of the Socialist Party of New York for a time. With the party, he ran for political office numerous times, but never won. He ran for the New York State Assembly in 1921, 1922, 1923, 1926, 1927, and 1929; he ran for Brooklyn's 5th district between 1921 and 1923, then ran for Brooklyn's 6th district between 1926 and 1929. He ran for New York State Senate in 1928, 1932, and 1936, running for the 7th district in 1928 and 1932, then for the 14th district in 1936. In 1934, he ran for the United States House of Representatives, for New York's 10th district.

Friedman ran for Vice President of the United States in 1952 and 1956, under Darlington Hoopes. In 1960, he was a delegate to the Socialist National Convention. At times, he also ran for Lieutenant Governor of New York, New York City Comptroller, and President of the New York City Council.

Friedman was a pacifist. He participated in the civil rights movement in the 1960s. In 1964, he was arrested during a sit-in alongside six other men, including activist Michael Schwerner. After the Socialist Party USA split in 1972, he opposed the majority Social Democrats, USA. He also condemned both the Democratic and the Republican Parties, calling them "rotten to the core". He was a member of the American Civil Liberties Union, as well as a board member of the League for Industrial Democracy and the Workers Defense League.

== Personal life and death ==
Friedman retired c. 1960. He was married to Mary Friedman. He fundraised for the United Jewish Appeal. He died on March 17, 1990, aged 93, from pneumonia, in the Bronx.

Party political offices
Preceded by Tucker P. Smith	Socialist Party of America vice presidential candidate 1952 (lost) 1956 (lost)	Succeeded by NA
