= Sarah Norcliffe Cleghorn =

American poet (1876–1959)

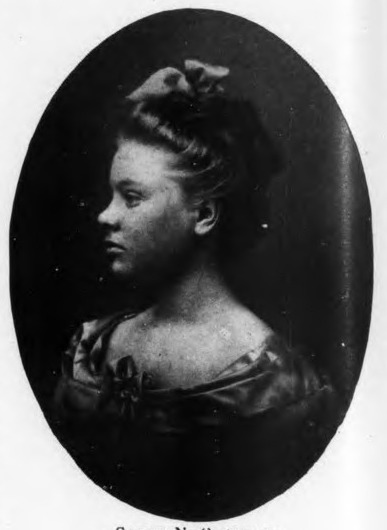
- Born: Sarah Norcliffe Dalton; February 4, 1876; Norfolk
- Died: April 4, 1959; Philadelphia
- Education: Radcliffe College
- Occupations: Poet, novelist, autobiographer, journalist, teacher, political activist, writer

Sarah Norcliffe Cleghorn (February 4, 1876 – April 4, 1959) was an educator, author, social reformer and poet whose work was associated with the American Naturalist literary movement.

== Early years ==
Born in Norfolk, Virginia, Cleghorn spent her early childhood in Wisconsin and Minnesota, then moved to Manchester, Vermont after the death of her mother to live with her father's sisters. Although she regularly traveled and was tenured both with the Brookwood Labor College and the Manumit School, Cleghorn is largely associated with Manchester, which was her primary home. She graduated from Burr and Burton Seminary in Manchester, Vermont in 1895 then spent a year at Radcliffe College. During her early years in southern Vermont, Cleghorn came to know Dorothy Canfield Fisher, who also became a noted writer and educator. The two women maintained a close relationship throughout their lifetimes and collaborated on several books.

== Writer and social reformer ==
Cleghorn's poetry is largely didactic in nature, serving to illustrate Christian Socialist values and progressive political and social principles. Her early work was published in the Atlantic Monthly, Harpers, The American Magazine, and others. Cleghorn was involved in various reform movements such as anti-vivisection, vegetarianism, pacifism and opposition to capital punishment and lynching. In 1913, she joined Socialist Party of America. Some of her later work was published in The Masses, The Survey, and The World Tomorrow. Her most widely known poem "The Golf Links" is an ironic and satirical look at child labor. It first appeared in F.P.A.'s column in the New-York Tribune.

The golf links lie so near the mill
That almost every day
The laboring children can look out
And see the men at play.

Cleghorn was a Quaker pacifist. She supported animal rights and opposed vivisection. She was a vegetarian and condemned animal experiments, fishing and hunting. Her book The Seamless Robe: The Religion of Lovingkindness advocated Christian vegetarianism with compassion and love to both animals and humans. However, in the 1930s Cleghorn who had pernicious anaemia gave up vegetarianism and returned to eating meat.

== Works and publications ==
- A Turnpike Lady: Beartown, Vermont, 1768-1796. Henry Holt and Company. 1907.
- The Spinster: A Novel Wherein a Nineteenth Century Girl Finds Her Place in the Twentieth. Henry Holt and Company. 1916.
- Fellow Captains. Henry Holt and Company. 1916. With Dorothy Canfield Fisher
- Portraits and Protests. Henry Holt and Company. 1917.
- Ballad of Gene Debs. The Driftwood Press. 1928.
- Understood Betsy, a play, adapted by Sarah N. Cleghorn from "Understood Betsy", by Dorothy Canfield Fisher. Harcourt, Brace and Company. 1934.
- Threescore: The Autobiography of Sarah N. Cleghorn. Harrison Smith & Robert Haas. 1936.
- Nothing Ever Happens and How it Does: Sixteen True Stories. The Beacon Press. 1940. With Dorothy Canfield Fisher
- Poems of Peace and Freedom. New York State Branch of the Women's International League for Peace and Freedom Trade. 1945.
- The Seamless Robe: The Religion of Lovingkindness. Macmillan Company. 1945.
