= Arthur W. Calhoun =

American academic

Arthur Wallace Calhoun (1885–1979) was a scholar, author, and professor at a wide variety of American colleges. He is well known for his published works and his teachings in worker's education.

== Biography ==
Calhoun was born January 29, 1885, in Dayton, Pennsylvania, the son of Noah Franklin Calhoun and Sarah Nancy (White) Calhoun. His father was a physician. Calhoun began his education at the University of Pittsburgh where he received his B.A. in 1906. Calhoun later married Mildred Tourtellot in 1916, with whom he fathered two sons. His first son was born in 1917 and later became Dr. Donald Wallace Calhoun, a sociologist. In 1921, Calhoun had his second son, Dr. Robert Allan Calhoun, a statistician and Director of Vital Statistics, Indiana State Board of Health 1955-1990.

Calhoun was a well-educated man and highly regarded for his teachings in workers education. Following his graduation from the University of Pittsburgh, Calhoun began studying at the Reformed Presbyterian Theological Seminary in 1909, but he dropped out due to ill health. He received his MA from the University of Wisconsin in 1913 and his PhD from Clark University in 1916. Calhoun then completed additional graduate work at Columbia University.

Calhoun taught at many American colleges over his career as a professor. He began as the professor of English and Philosophy at New Windsor College in New Windsor, Maryland, from 1906 to 1907. Calhoun then taught Latin and History at St. Petersburg High School in St. Petersburg, Florida, from 1907 to 1909; German and History at Florida State College for Women (now Florida State University) from 1910 to 1911; Social Science at Lenox College in Hopkinton, Iowa, from 1912 to 1913 and at Maryville College in Maryville, Tennessee, from 1913 to 1915.

Calhoun then returned to Clark University to become a Fellow in Sociology and received his doctorate and became Assistant Professor of Economics from 1916 to 1918. Calhoun held socially radical opinions and very rarely held a position for long. Therefore, he moved from place to place including, Assistant Professor of Sociology at the University of Kentucky from 1918 to 1919; Teacher of Cooperative at the Rand School of Social Science in New York City from 1920 to 1921; Professor of Economics at Grove City College in Grove City, Pennsylvania, from 1921 to 1922; Teacher of Latin and Spanish, Orlando, Fl., Jr. High School, 1922–23; Teacher of Social Science at Brookwood Labor College in Katonah, New York, 1923–29; Professor of History at Limestone College in Gaffney, South Carolina, from 1929 to 1932; Professor of German and Greek, Erskine College in Due West, South Carolina, 1933–36, Dean of Sterling College, 1936–55; Professor of Sociology at Illinois College in Jacksonville, Illinois, from 1957 to 58; and Professor of Social Science, Claflin University in Orangeburg, South Carolina, in 1958. Calhoun is most famous for his years in workers education at Brookwood Labor College in N.Y. where he taught many about American Labor Issues.

Calhoun was also the author of many published books. His most famous works included: Social History of the American Family, three volumes, 1916-1919; The Worker Looks at Government, 1927; The Social Universe, 1932; Social Regeneration, 1945; and The Cultural Concept of Christianity. He also wrote many short books and contributed to others such as American Labor Dynamics, 1928; The New Generation, 1930; Behold America, 1931; and The Early American Family, 1932.

Along with his books, Calhoun wrote many articles and short published works that can be found in the Arthur. W. Calhoun Collection of the Walter P. Reuther Library at Wayne State University.

Calhoun was baptized as an infant in a Dayton-area congregation of the Reformed Presbyterian Church; he remained in the denomination until 1916, when he joined the People's Church. In the same year, he married the former Mildred Alice Tourtellot in Austinville, Iowa. He held many positions in his life as an author and professor of multiple fields. His pacifist beliefs and socially radical opinions caused for much scrutiny but also allowed him to educate a wide variety of students.

== Death ==
Calhoun died in 1978 at the age of 93.
