= Thyra J. Edwards =

American educator, social worker and activist (1897–1953)

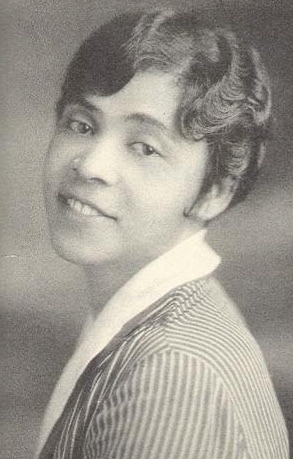
- Edwards in an undated photograph.
- Born: Thyra Johnson Edwards; December 25, 1897; Wharton, Texas, U.S.
- Died: July 9, 1953 (aged 55); New York, U.S.
- Other names: Thyra Edwards Gitlin
- Occupations: Journalist, educator, social worker, activist

Thyra Johnson Edwards (December 25, 1897 – July 9, 1953) was an African-American educator, social worker, journalist, labor and civil rights activist, and women's rights activist. Pan-Africanist, and communist.

== Early life ==
Thyra Johnson Edwards was born in 1897 in Wharton, Texas, the daughter of Horace Ferdinand Edwards and Anna Bell Johnson Edwards. Her grandparents were runaway slaves who migrated from Missouri to Illinois. Edwards' mother was a teacher in Wharton County. Both of Edwards' parents were involved in community work and social reform. The Edwards family later relocated to Houston.

Thyra Edwards graduated from Houston Colored High School in 1915. While in high school, she held close friendships with black and white girls her age. She recalls her personal interracial friendships and noticing how their skin-tones were a determining factor in their daily experiences. She trained as a social worker at the Chicago School of Civics and Philanthropy. She also studied labor politics at Brookwood Labor College, and pursued further studies at the International People's College in Elsinore, Denmark, in 1933.

=== The Soviet Union ===
In the early 1930s, Edwards traveled to the Soviet Union to "explore for the soviet promise of a better society”. Her trip to the Soviet Union was a significant adventure for her and supported her views, like the value of communism to civil rights and sexual liberation.

== Career ==
Edwards started as a teacher in Texas, right after high school. She became a charter member of the Houston chapter of the NAACP when it formed in 1918. In 1919, she began working for the Houston Social Service Bureau as a family visitor, where she began her work in social work. The next year moved to Gary, Indiana with her sister, Thelma.

She was based in Indiana for the next twelve years, working as a teacher, social worker, and juvenile probation officer, interracial activist, while lecturing and becoming more active in labor and civil rights work. In 1925 she became a child placement specialist with the Lake County Board of Guardians. In 1927 she helped to open the Lake County Children's Home, and she served as its director for three years. She was one of the founders of Gary's Interracial Commission in 1924, and served on the board of the John Stewart Social Settlement Center, a settlement house serving African Americans in Gary. She organized the Business and Professional Women's Club in Gary. She spoke at the National Negro Business League conference in St. Louis, Missouri in 1927. She was vice-president of the Gary Council of Social Agencies, and active in the city's YWCA.

Edwards traveled in Europe in 1929, and moved to Chicago in 1931, to be a social worker with the Joint Emergency Relief Commission, while living at the Abraham Lincoln Centre, a settlement house. She soon became active with the Brotherhood of Sleeping Car Porters, a black union based in Chicago, and with the Progressive Miners of America in southern Illinois. In 1933 she was part of forming the Chicago Scottsboro Action Committee.

Edwards was a caseworker for the Joint Emergency Relief Commission. In mid-1930s, she traveled in England, Scandinavia, Austria, Germany, and the Soviet Union, then on the Spain to work with child refugees of the Spanish Civil War. As head of the women's committee of the National Negro Congress during World War II, she taught about the Soviet Union at the Carver School. In 1944, she was heralded as "one of the most outstanding negro women in the world." At the end of World War II, she became the Executive Director of the Congress of American Women.

Thyra Edwards felt that she had an international approach to social work, and engaged in journals, engagement in communities, and union organizations. Her social work career focused on a perspective that modern day social workers call "work systems theory."

Her social work viewpoint focused on advocating for at-risk populations and predisposed disadvantages, the injustices affecting the well-being of women and working with and uniting diverse populations.

During this time in the history of America, it was believed that black social workers should only help the blacks, but Thyra Edwards helped people of all races, nationalities and ethnicities.

== Communist work ==
In the early 1930s, Thyra Edwards traveled to Europe for work in international affairs. Edwards visited Sweden, Finland, Poland, Germany and France. In Paris, Edwards led a travel seminar, The European Seminar of International Relations, an international group of social workers who were involved in European social movements, such as the rise of communism and socialism. The European Seminar of International Relations traveled to Spain, and the Soviet Union, which was a “safe haven” for black radicalists at the time. Edwards attended the International Congress against Anti-Semitism Racial Discrimination.

While Edwards was studying organizing and studying in Europe, she traveled to Spain, where she spent a significant amount of organizing during the Spanish Civil War. She worked alongside her academic peers, surveying colonies of children who were evacuated and relocated due to the war. When Edwards returned to America she continued pursuing her organizing work for Spain with the Negro Committee to Aid Spanish Democracy. Langston Hughes admired, and acknowledged her work.

During her time traveling in Europe, in 1953, she organized the first Jewish child care program in Rome to assist the children who had fallen victim to the Holocaust.

Thyra Edwards supported the Loyalists in the Spanish Civil War, and used her role to not only travel to Europe and the Soviet Union, but also to Mexico to further her work. Because of this, the FBI monitored Thyra's work until she died.

== Writing ==
As a journalist, Edwards wrote news articles for the Associated Negro Press. She wrote from her travels for African-American periodicals, including a 1932 report on a homeless men's shelter in Chicago, a 1933 interview with Nigerian lawyer Stella Thomas, whom she described as "tall and black and real and beautiful and poised, and wrapped in flame", and "Negro Literature Comes to Demark", her 1936 report from the International People's School. She wrote about the Spanish Civil War in a series of articles for the Chicago Defender. Edwards used these articles to express her support for socialism and her opposition to fascism, saying of the latter ideology that "Fascism degrades women".

== Personal life ==
Thyra J. Edwards married steelworker James Malcolm Garnett in 1924; they divorced a year later. She married again, to Murray Gitlin, in 1943. After 1948, they lived in Italy, where he was working with the American Jewish Joint Distribution Committee.

In 1946, Edward’s was diagnosed with rheumatoid arthritis. She was then later diagnosed with breast cancer. Thyra Edwards Gitlin died in New York, 1953, aged 55 years, from breast cancer. The Thyra Edwards Papers are archived at the Chicago History Museum. Actor William Marshall was Thyra Edwards' nephew, the son of her sister, Thelma Edwards Marshall.
