= Tucker P. Smith =

American politician and academic (1898–1970)

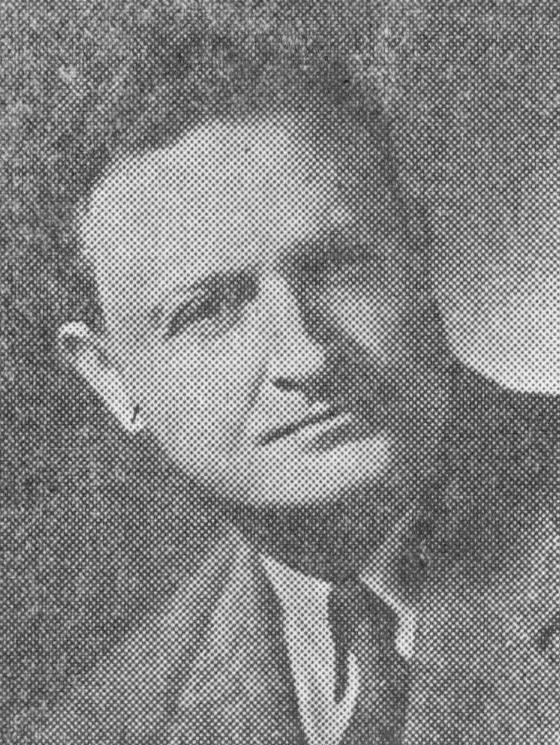
- A photo of Smith from a 1948 voters' pamphlet.
- Born: January 29, 1898
- Died: June 25, 1970 (aged 72)
- Education: University of Missouri

Tucker Powell Smith (January 29, 1898 – June 25, 1970) was an American academic and political activist. He was an economics professor at Brookwood Labor College and Olivet College. He was the Socialist Party of America's nominee for Vice President in the 1948 United States presidential election alongside presidential nominee Norman Thomas.

== Background ==
Circa 1930, Smith graduated from the University of Missouri with a bachelor's degree and master's degree in political science. He was a member of Phi Beta Kappa, Delta Sigma Rho, and Alpha Zeta Pi.

== Career ==
In the 1930s, Smith was a faculty member at Brookwood Labor College. On June 5, 1933, with the departure of A. J. Muste, Smith was appointed director of the college until it closed in 1937.

Smith was a Quaker and a committed pacifist. He was a member of the Committee on Militarism in Education, the War Resisters League, and the Fellowship of Reconciliation, major pacifist organizations during and after World War I.

In 1948, Smith was selected as the Socialist vice presidential candidate to run along with Norman Thomas. The 1948 Socialist ticket garnered 139,569 votes. In 1930, Tucker was the Socialist candidate for U.S. Representative from New York 2nd District. Tucker finished third of four candidates with 6,144 votes for 3.8% of the total vote.

On January 8, 1949, Smith was dismissed from his position at Olivet College because he had organized a teachers' union following the dismissal of colleague and professor of political science T. Barton Akeley. In May 1949, Socialist Party dinner, New York University philosophy professor Sidney Hook attacked Smith's dismissal, arguing that teachers should be judged on merit only by their peers.

Party political offices
Preceded by Darlington Hoopes	Socialist Party of America vice presidential candidate 1948 (lost)	Succeeded by Samuel H. Friedman
