= Joel I. Seidman =

20th-century Socialist labor economics professor and author

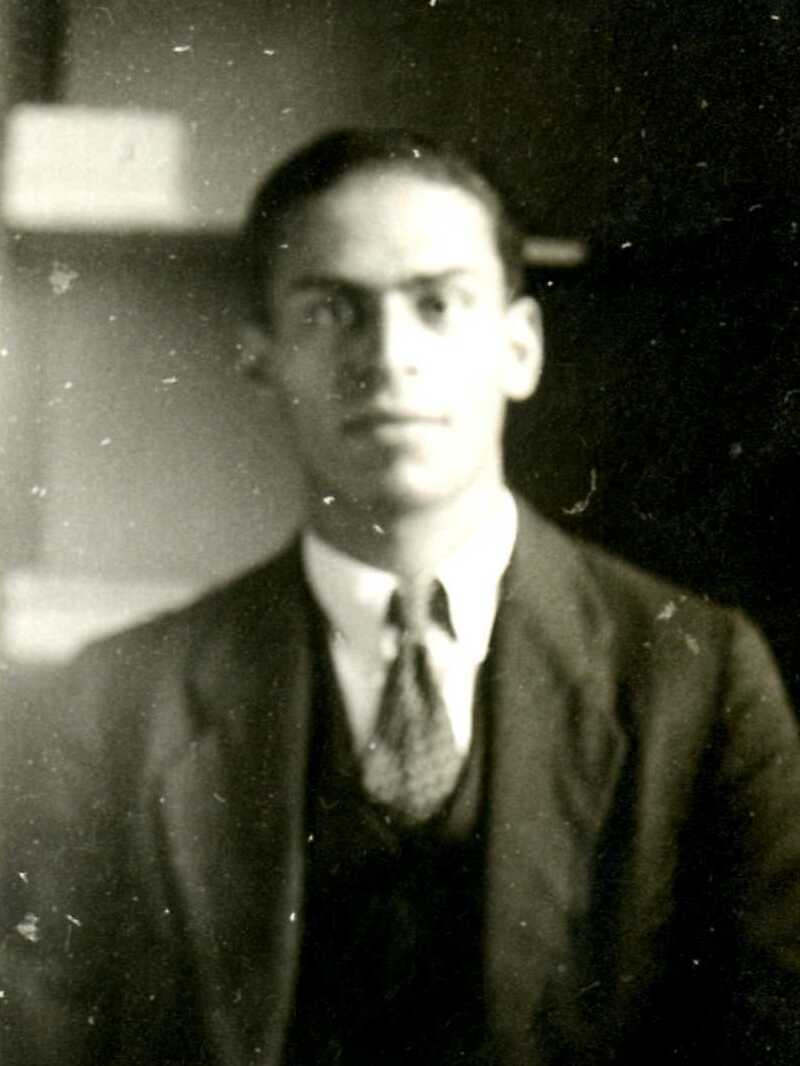
Seidman in 1923

Joel I. Seidman (1906 – October 17, 1977) was a 20th-century economics professor and Socialist, best known for his 1932 dissertation and book The Yellow Dog Contract as well as work with Brookwood Labor College.

== Background ==
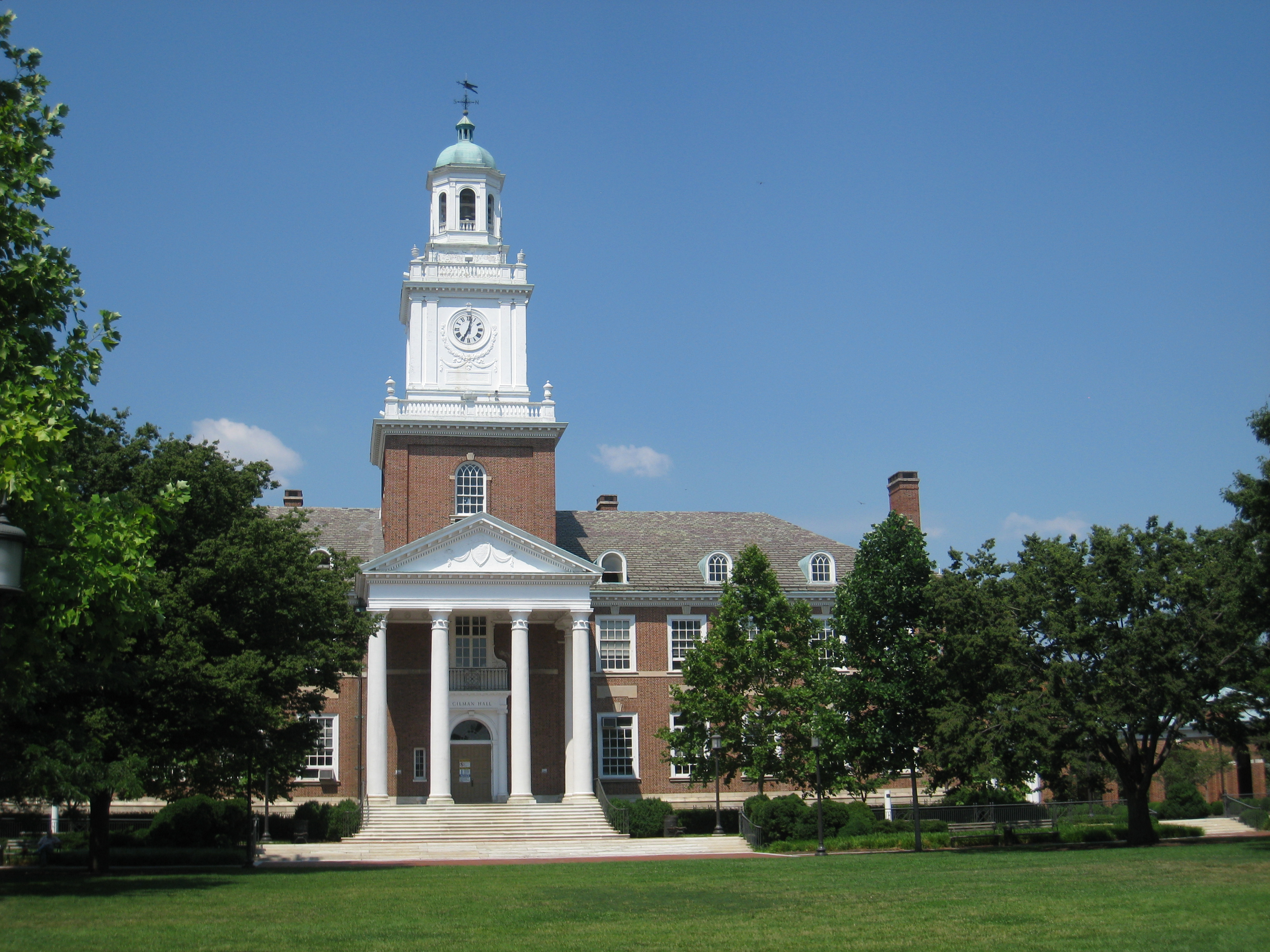
Seidman studied at the Johns Hopkins University in the mid-1920s (here, Gilman Hall)

Joel Isaac Seidman was born in 1906. He attended the Baltimore City College and earned a BA from the Johns Hopkins University in 1926. He earned a doctorate with a thesis on yellow-dog contracts.

== Career ==
Seidman taught at Brookwood Labor College in the 1930s (here, main building)

In the mid-1930s, Seidman taught for three years at the Brookwood Labor College, whose Brookwood Labor Publications published some of his works (e.g., A Labor Party for America? [1936]). As part of Brookwood's field work, Seidman met with UAW leaders including Walter Reuther to discuss the sitdown strike strategy, about which Seidman also wrote for the UAW. In the later 1930s, Seidman became director of Brookwood Labor College (which closed in 1937).

For a period of fifteen years, Seidman was associated with trade unions, chiefly the International Ladies' Garment Workers Union (ILGWU), AFL, and the United Automobile Workers of America (UAW), CIO.

In the late 1930s and into World War II (1939), League for Industrial Democracy organized summer institutes to educate students in union organizing and sponsored lecture tours by Seidman and LeRoy Bower.

During the 1930s and 1940s, Seidman served for five years on the National Labor Relations Board, less time spent in military service during World War II.

In the 1938 United States House of Representatives elections, Seidman ran for New York's 13th congressional district seat on the Socialist ticket.

Around 1947, Seidman joined the Industrial Relations Center in the University of Chicago's Graduate School of Business, where he taught and directed research, as well as serving as chairman of the Hyde Park Cooperative Society.

== Works ==
Seidman wrote the first-ever book on yellow dog contracts. It traced their history from the 1830s in the United Kingdom, the 1870s in the United States, the use of the term "yellow dog" following World War I, to a land-mark event when the U.S. Senate rejected the nomination of Judge John J. Parker to the United States Supreme Court.

Articles

- "The Yellow Dog Contract"" (1932)

Books

- The Yellow Dog Contract (1932)
- The Needle Trades (1942)
- Union Rights and Union Dues (1943)
- American Labor from Defense to Reconversion (1953)
- The Brotherhood of Railroad Trainmen (1962)
- Communism in the United States: A Bibliography (1969)

Co-Authored Books

- The Leadership Group in a Local Union (1950)
- The Worker Views His Union (1958)
- Trade Union Government and Collective Bargaining (1970)

Pamphlets, papers, monographs, lectures, and other

- Brookwood Labor Publications of Brookwood Labor College:
  - The Labor Movement Today (1934)
  - A Labor Party for America? (1936)
  - The Company Union (1936)
- Methods of War Resistance (practicum) (1939?)
- Education Department of the United Automobile Workers of America:
  - Introduction to Labor Problems (1937)
  - The Wagner Act and the Automobile Worker (1937)
  - Labor Problems and Sketch of American Labor Movement (1937)
  - The Elements of Trade Unionism (1937)
- "Sit-Down" (1937)
- Democracy in the Labor Movement (1958)
- Union Constitutions: Political Rights of Members (1959)
- Abraham Bisno, Union Pioneer with foreword by Joel Seidman (1967)
- Industrial Relations Center, College of Business Administration, University of Hawaii:
  - Industrial Relations Systems of the United States and New Zealand: A Comparison (1969)
  - Public Sector Collective Bargaining and the Administrative Process (1972)
  - A Guide to Discipline in the Public Sector (1977)

Co-Authored papers, monographs

- Some Presidential Interpretations of the Presidency (1932)
- Strikes Under the New Deal (1935-7?)
- Shall Strikes be Outlawed? (1938)
- Russia–Democracy Or Dictatorship? (1939)
- Political Consciousness in a Local Union (1951)
- The Dual Union Clause and Political Rights (1960)
- The Hawaii Law on Collective Bargaining in Public Employment (1973)
- Faculty Attitudes and Choice of a Collective Bargaining Agency in Hawaii (1974)
- The Education and Employment of Women Graduates in New Zealand (1975)
- The Merit Principle and Collective Bargaining in Hawaii: A Study (1976)

== See also ==
- Yellow dog contract
- Brookwood Labor College

== External sources ==
- Wayne State University - Reuther Center: "Labor Movement Today" - Class of Joel Seidman at Brookwood Labor College
