= Brookwood Labor College =

Coordinates: 41°16′30″N 73°40′5.5″W

Main building of Brookwood Labor College, located on a former estate in Westchester County, New York.

Brookwood Labor College (1921 to 1937) was a labor college located at 109 Cedar Road in Katonah, New York, United States. Founded as Brookwood School in 1919 and established as a college in 1921, it was the first residential labor college in the country. Its founding and longest-serving president was A. J. Muste. The school was supported by affiliate unions of the American Federation of Labor (AFL) until 1928.

The Brookwood faculty's emphasis on trade union militancy and on advocacy of socialism was opposed by the AFL's Executive Council, which pressured the AFL's unions to withdraw support for the school. Brookwood was later riven by internal dissent over whether it should support militant unionism or remain strictly an educational organization.

Suffering from financial difficulties, Brookwood closed in 1937. It is considered one of the most influential labor colleges in American history and was known as "labor's Harvard." Its best known alumnus was Walter Reuther.

== Formation, governance and mission ==
=== The Brookwood School ===
Between 1914 and 1921, a number of adult education and training organizations were founded to serve the American labor movement. Adult education was considered by these organizations and individuals to be the key to promoting class consciousness and teaching the skills needed to challenge the power of employers. Among the many different types of organizations created were labor colleges—experimental institutions of higher education designed to meet the needs of the labor movement as well as the educational needs of labor's often-uneducated adult members.

The Brookwood School was the predecessor to Brookwood Labor College. On March 19, 1914, William Mann Fincke, a liberal clergyman and son of a coal mine owner, purchased the 53-acre (210,000 m^{2}) Brookwood Estate in Katonah, New York, for $3,700. Deeply upset by the crushing of the steel strike of 1919, Fincke and his wife, Helen Hamlin Fincke, decided to found a school to teach working-class teenagers nonviolent ways to achieve social justice and political change. The curriculum was organized by Fincke to reflect the business life of the local community. The curriculum also emphasized social service and the study of economics, English literature, mathematics, social problems, and history. Students were urged to participate in the daily management of the school. With financial assistance and organizational support from Robert W. Dunn, John Nevin Sayre, and Norman Thomas, Brookwood School opened in the fall of 1919. The student body was initially 16- to 19-year-old males who were accepted on the basis of merit, and there was no tuition.

=== Formation of Brookwood Labor College ===
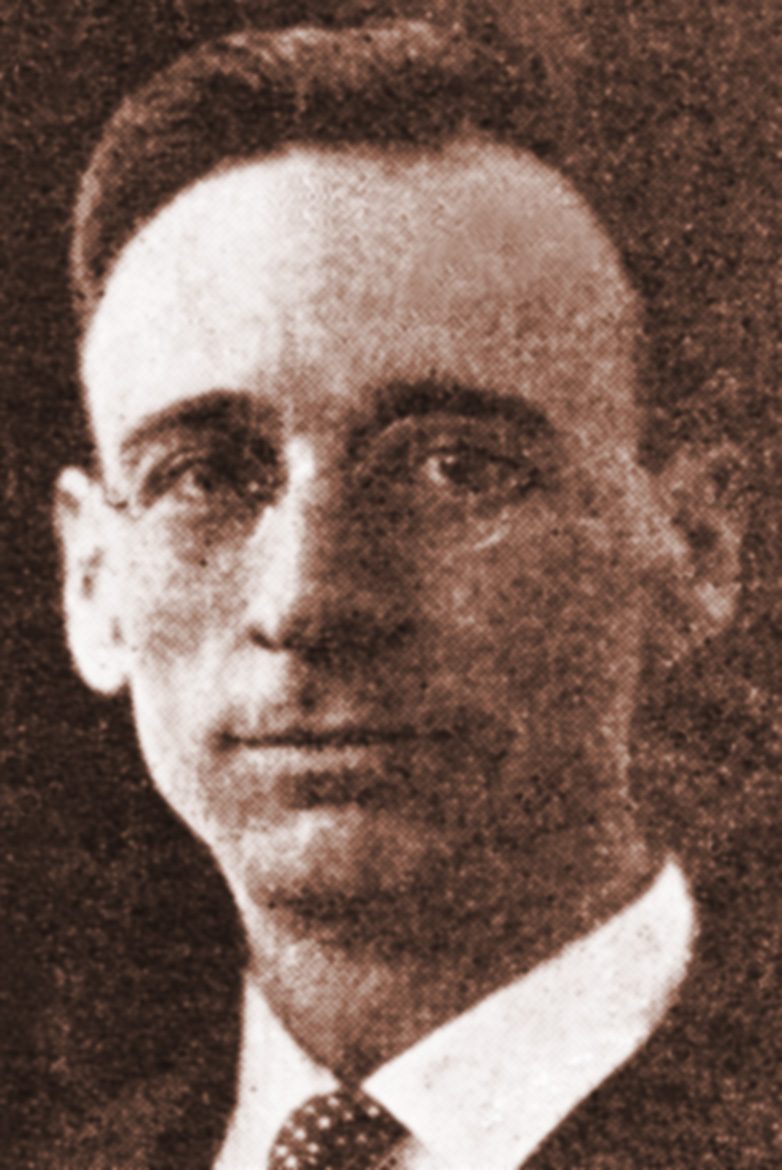
Brookwood Labor College is best remembered for its association with its first director, pacifist Christian minister A. J. Muste.

By 1921, the Brookwood School was facing major obstacles. The cost of running the school was mounting, and the Finckes realized that Brookwood needed to expand significantly in order to meet the needs of the working class. M. Tuscan Bennett and his wife, Josephine, joined the school in February 1921, and were close friends of the Finckes. After extensive discussion with the Bennetts, the Finckes decided to turn Brookwood School over to a group of trade union activists. The negotiations for the transfer of the estate occurred during a March 31-to-April 1, 1921, conference at Brookwood. Among those present at the conference were Fannia Cohn, education director of the International Ladies' Garment Workers' Union; William Z. Foster, leader of the 1919 steel strike; Abraham Lefkowitz, president of the American Federation of Teachers; James H. Maurer, president of the Pennsylvania Federation of Labor; Rose Schneiderman, president of the Women's Trade Union League; and A. J. Muste, pacifist minister and secretary of the Amalgamated Textile Workers of America. Brookwood Labor College was founded once the transfer was complete. Fundraising to open the new college then proceeded. Tuscan Bennett oversaw the effort, and the donors included Jane Addams, Stuart Chase, John R. Commons, Herbert Croly, John Dewey, and Freda Kirchwey.

Brookwood was governed by a 10-member Board of Directors, a majority of whom were officials of American Federation of Labor (AFL) unions. Faculty, student, and alumni representatives comprised the rest of the board. Unions providing scholarships for students were also eligible for seats on the board. Early board members included John Brophy, president of United Mine Workers of America District 2; John Fitzpatrick, president of the Chicago Federation of Labor; Clinton S. Golden, a former textile union organizer; Rose Schneiderman, president of the Amalgamated Textile Workers of America; and J.B.S. Hardman, education director of the Amalgamated Clothing Workers. James Maurer was elected president of the board.

The board was a constantly changing entity. Later board members included Fannia Cohn; Cara Cook, Brookwood faculty member and librarian; Robert Fechner, a vice president of the International Association of Machinists; Gustav Geiges, president of the American Federation of Full Fashioned Hosiery Workers; Fred Hewitt, editor of the Machinists' Monthly Journal; Abraham Lefkowitz; A.J. Kennedy, president of the Amalgamated Lithographers of America; Tom Tippett, Brookwood extension director; and Phil Ziegler, editor of the official journal of the Brotherhood of Railway Clerks.

Tuscan Bennett served as the school's executive secretary for the first three years of its operation, and Golden served for many years as its business manager. An advisory board was also established.

=== Values and goals ===
Brookwood's founders believed that worker education would play a key role in helping bring about social change in a nonviolent way. The founders believed in four tenets: "First, that a new social order is needed and is coming—in fact, that it is already on the way. Second, that education will not only hasten its coming, but will reduce to a minimum and perhaps do away entirely with a resort to violent methods. Third, that the workers are the ones who will usher in this new order. Fourth, that there is immediate need for a workers' college with a broad curriculum, located amid healthy country surroundings, where the students can completely apply themselves to the task at hand." Nearly all of Brookwood's founders were pacifists, and all of them sought an end to violence and war. They also believed in a strong and powerful labor movement. The existing labor movement, as epitomized by the dominant American Federation of Labor, was too unwilling, they felt, to challenge employers, too wedded to the existing political and economic system, and too focused on organizing only the most highly skilled workers into craft unions. Instead, Brookwood's leaders emphasized the mass unionization of workers into industrial unions (workers organized not by job type, but by industry), the unionization of semi-skilled workers and unskilled workers, and the merger of craft unions merge into industrial unions. They believed in a new social order based on the equality of workers and an elimination of discrimination based on race, gender, or nationality.

Brookwood's leaders and faculty were almost all left-wing in their politics. But what this meant is unclear. Labor historian Philip S. Foner argued that Brookwood's political leanings were radically left-wing, but historian Francis Ryan contends the leadership and faculty ran the gamut from center-left to Marxist. William Green biographer Craig Phelan describes the faculty as mostly progressives and labor reformers, few of whom supported the craft union and conservative trade union policies of the AFL. Any generalization is difficult since, as Ryan points out, no single political orthodoxy governed the college's faculty or students. There did, however, seem to be a fairly broad consensus among the faculty and leadership that Brookwood should cultivate a proletarian consciousness in its students. Many of the college's leaders and faculty also assumed that Brookwood graduates would seek employment in the labor movement after graduation, and work to change the conservative policies of AFL president Samuel Gompers.

== Funding ==
Initially, Brookwood sought financing from national, state and local labor unions. Endorsement of the school by labor unions, the New York Times said, was "practically universal". By 1925, 13 international unions had given money to Brookwood. Four others declined to provide funds, but warmly endorsed the college. There was also significant funding from the AFL in the early years, although Green declined to endorse the college on the grounds that such endorsements properly were the made by the Workers' Education Bureau (WEB). This funding continued for several years. For example, several international unions gave a total of $12,000 in early 1928.

But labor unions proved to be an inadequate source of funds and Brookwood turned to wealthy, progressive individuals and foundations for income. Among Brookwood's many donors were Dorothy Elmhirst and the American Fund for Public Service (better known as the Garland Fund). Evelyn Preston, a wealthy philanthropist and president of the League of Women Shoppers, gave $10,000 to the college from 1932 to 1935. Local business people, like Wappingers Falls laundry owner Harold Hatch, and Fannia Cohn's brother, sister, and brother-in-law also contributed large sums.

Nonetheless, most of Brookwood's income came from tuition payments. Tuition was low, just $200 a semester or $450 a year ($8,123 in 2025 dollars). The college's relatively high income from tuition allowed it to remain independent of both the AFL and other unions.

== Campus ==
Brookwood initially consisted of a large two-story Colonial Revival home. On the ground floor was a social hall with two fireplaces, a library, a dining room, and a kitchen. The second floor contained faculty apartments and offices, and tiny student rooms were in the attic.

Expansion took place quickly. In 1924, a major donor gave funds to build a two-story red brick women's dormitory behind the main house. Three small wooden cottages were added to create additional male housing in 1925, and three houses for faculty were built from 1925 to 1926. (A fourth faculty house was built a few years later.)

By 1926, Brookwood was planning to erect library and classroom buildings. Over the next few years, the college added a six-car garage, volleyball and tennis courts, and a swimming pool.

By 1937, the campus consisted of the main house, an administration building, the women's dormitory, seven cottages of five to 10 rooms each that could sleep for seven to 10 men, a six-car garage, and a number of outbuildings.

== Curriculum and faculty ==
=== Faculty ===
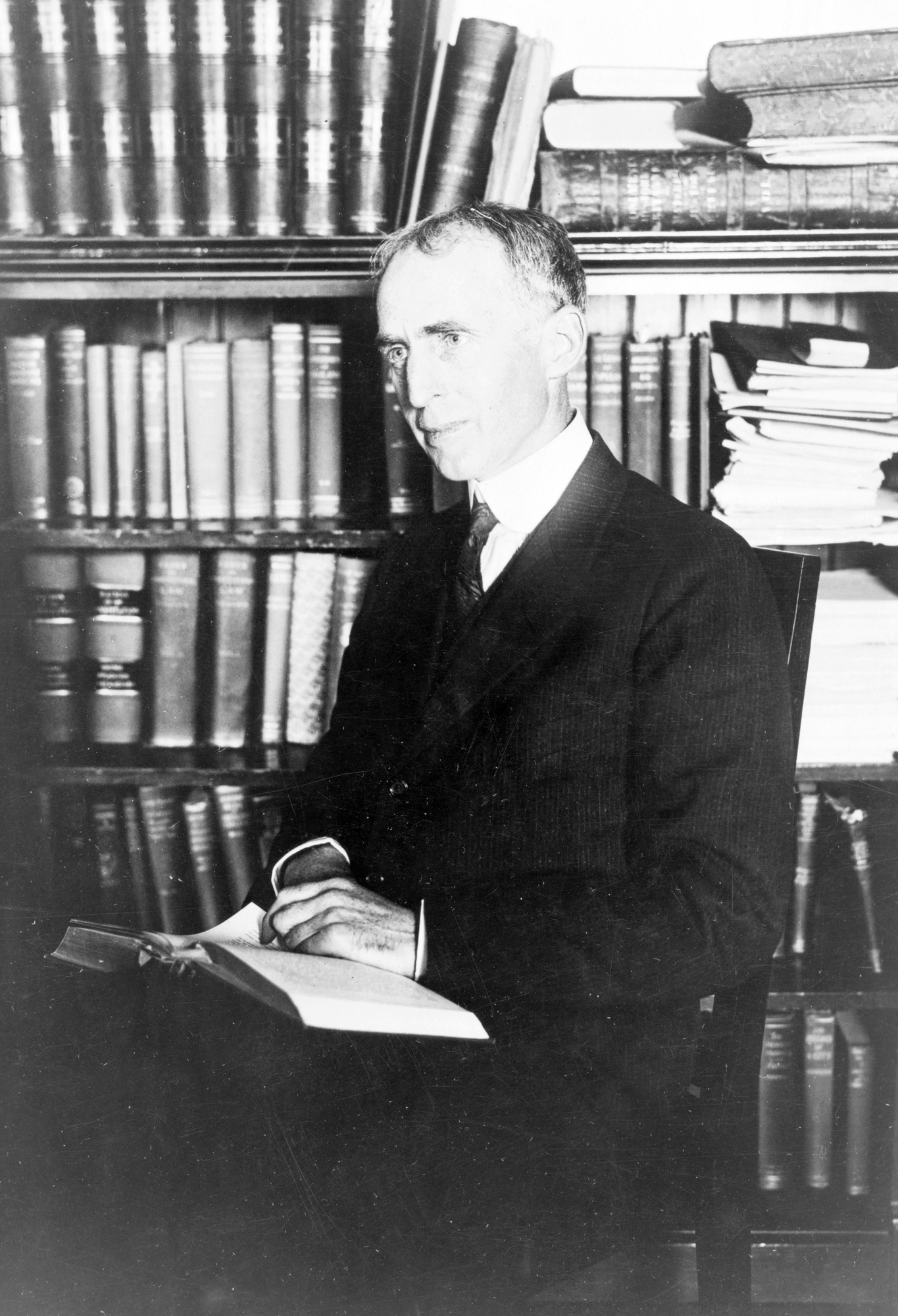
Charles A. Beard was one of Brookwood's most famous faculty members.

Brookwood's Director was A.J. Muste, a Christian and pacifist. He also served as chairman of the faculty, and taught world history. John C. Kennedy was the Director of Studies, and Tom Tippett the director of extension activities. Cara Cook acted as both Brookwood's librarian and served as administrative assistant to Muste. In later years, she taught classes and tutored students at the college as well.

Faculty taught either full- or part-time. Notable faculty who taught there (for a part or most of the school's history) included:

- Charles A. Beard (history)
- Louis Budenz (labor organizing and strike management)
- Dr. Arthur W. Calhoun (sociology and history)
- Sarah Norcliffe Cleghorn (writing and nonviolent techniques)
- Josephine Colby (public speaking)
- Katherine Pollak Ellickson (writing and economics)
- Jack Frager (labor history)
- Abram Lincoln Harris (economics)
- John C. Kennedy (economics)
- John Martindale (union organization and parliamentary procedure)
- Dr. Broadus Mitchell (economics)
- Helen G. Norton (labor journalism)
- Roy Reuther (labor organizing)
- Lawrence Rogin (trade union organization and labor journalism)
- John Nevin Sayre (nonviolent techniques)
- Dr. David J. Saposs (economics)
- Dr. Joel I. Seidman (economics and union issues)
- Tucker P. Smith (later Socialist candidate for U.S. vice president
- Mark Starr (British labor history)
- Dr. Lazare Teper (economics)
- Tom Tippett (strike organizing and music)
- Nat Weinberg (economics)

Clinton S. Golden is often claimed to have been on the faculty. But as Golden's biographer Thomas Brooks, points out, Golden lectured occasionally at Brookwood but was never appointed to the faculty. His role on the board of directors precluded it.

The faculty was integrated (Harris was African American). The faculty was also unionized, with all teachers members of Local 189 of the American Federation of Teachers.

Faculty at Brookwood were an integral part of the school's administration. Faculty had a formal role in directing the school and in setting its educational policies. Faculty also helped establish and maintain Brookwood's clearinghouse on worker education materials, and hosted an annual conference on worker education that drew labor educators from across the nation.

=== Curriculum ===
Generalizations about the curriculum are difficult because it was constantly changing.

However, Brookwood's curriculum primarily emphasized general education, with a strong emphasis on labor economics, labor history, and trade union organizing. The curriculum focused primarily on the humanities, and included courses in contemporary politics, creative writing, economics, English literature, labor history, literacy and reading comprehension, sociology, language studies, public speaking, rhetoric, and world history. Because so many students were immigrants or had very low levels of education, basic courses in reading and writing were also taught. Faculty also taught courses in how to be a better student, such as "How to Study" and "Use of the English Language". Brookwood's curriculum also emphasized the theory and practice of trade union organization and administration and labor militancy. Common courses included "History of the American Labor Movement", "Trade Union Organization Work", and "Foreign Labor History". "Preparation for Field Work", another labor course, analyzed successful and failed strikes and organizing campaigns, ways to generate positive publicity, and the difficulties of organizing disparate groups of workers. There were also courses in running meetings and parliamentary procedure. Texts included works by John R. Commons, David J. Saposs, and William Z. Foster. Courses in economics emphasized the maldistribution of wealth, the problems of the free market, and the benefits of a socialism, while those in psychology discussed how best to approach workers in union organizing campaigns. An exceptionally strong labor journalism course was offered, and the school published its own weekly journal, the Brookwood Review. Lawrence Rogin, who joined the school in 1934, was the journal's editor until 1937, and students were encouraged to submit pieces for publication to sharpen the skills learned in class.

One of Brookwood's innovative aspects was its emphasis on personal learning. Non-competitiveness was emphasized. There were no grades, no tests, no report cards, and no diplomas. High quality work was demanded by one's fellow students, who often protested vocally and publicly when their peers turned in poor work.

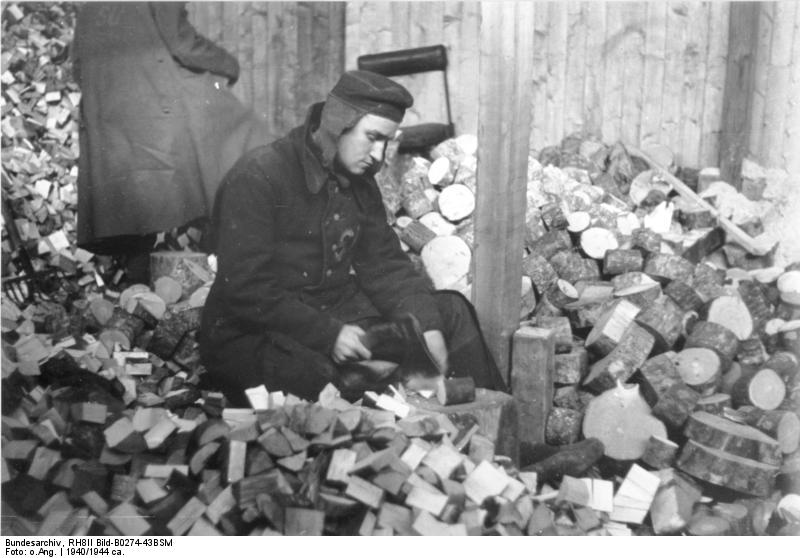
Wood chopping was one of the manual chores all faculty and students at Brookwood were expected to assist with.

Another innovation in the Brookwood curriculum was an emphasis on manual labor. All students were expected to engage in manual labor to keep the school clean and to make repairs to buildings, equipment, vehicles, and furniture. Cooking, serving meals, farming the college's extensive vegetable gardens, chopping wood for fuel, and assisting with the food and work animals on the campus were also expected. Faculty and even guests were expected to participate in manual labor as well.

Brookwood also worked to foster a strong sense of community among its leadership, faculty, and students. Enrollment in each course was kept small to encourage group cohesion. Small group work was common. Since many students were poor readers, just learning to read, or had English as a second language, educators often made sure that each group had at least one good reader. Together, the group conducted research, organized their work, and reported back orally to the rest of the class. Faculty ate at the same tables as students, and all meals were communal. A number of extracurricular activities were also offered to not only enhance the health of faculty and students but also to promote a sense of community. These included athletics, dances, group hikes, and communal singing.

Brookwood's educational program was initially a two-year one. Courses were three hours a week for 15 weeks. However, students and others pressed the college to make the program shorter to reduce the demands on workers, and a one-year program was added in 1926. Brookwood also began offering two-week "summer institutes" in 1926 for those who could not take the longer program. Speakers at these institutes included U.S. Senators, corporate executives, U.S. military personnel (often from the Corps of Engineers), and representatives from state regulatory agencies. Correspondence courses and extension courses (primarily delivered through labor unions) were part of the offerings as well. The college's educational efforts also included publication of a number of short, pragmatic pamphlets, worksheets, and booklets for workers to use in union organizing campaigns and strikes. Brookwood began offering a Chautauqua in 1934. Organized by students, the traveling show of speakers, drama, singers, and others traveled throughout New England, New Jersey, and Pennsylvania.

== Student body ==
Brookwood Labor College was a residential college, the first and only residential labor college in the United States.

Admission requirements to Brookwood were low. The college admitted students primarily on the basis of merit, looking for those with the most passion and promise for union work. Three references were required, two of them from labor union officials (to ensure that labor spies did not enroll). A student also had to be a worker and could not be independently wealthy. Union membership, however, was not required. Primarily socialist or radical-left unions sponsored students at Brookwood, however.

Brookwood accepted its first students and began classes in the fall of 1921 (although sources differ as to whether the school opened in September or October). There were just three faculty in the first term. The number of students is not clear. Some sources list 20, others 15, and some say just 12. Most of them were union members. Just under half of all students were immigrants, and more than half had never graduated from high school. Attendees came from all over the United States, and immigrants came from all over the world. Although most students were Christian, many were Jewish, and religious tolerance was enforced at the school. Students ranged in age from their late teens into their early 40s. The age range of students tended to narrow in Brookwood's later years, with most students aged 21-to-30 years of age (although some were older and some younger).

Brookwood had 40 students in 1926 and 42 students in May 1927. Later classes saw enrollment expand to as many as 50 students, although most years the number was 30 to 40.

Students in the first class came mostly from four industries: coal mining, garment manufacturing, machining, and textile manufacturing. In time, students from the agricultural, baking, carpentry, education, electronics manufacturing, food preparation, maritime, metalworking, painting, plumbing, railroad, retail, shoemaking, tailoring, taxicab, textile, upholstery, and woodworking sectors as well as the building trades.

Brookwood was co-educational from the beginning. During its history, about a third of all its students were women.

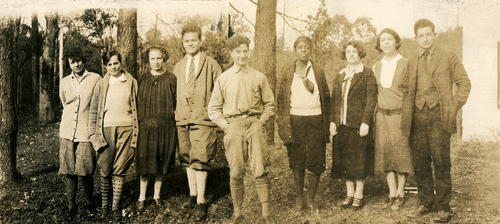
Floria Pinkney pictured (fourth from the right) with classmates in 1926.

Brookwood was also racially integrated, and black students participated fully and equally in the life of the school. Labor Activist, Floria Pinkney, was the first black woman to graduate from Brookwood. An African American student was elected student body president, and another elected to the board of directors. Courses emphasized the problems of black workers, and noted black labor leaders such as A. Philip Randolph and W. E. B. Du Bois lectured there.

Brookwood's student body was also international in make-up. By 1925, the school had five foreign students (two from Denmark, and one each from Belgium, Japan, and the United Kingdom). That same year, the school (with financial assistance from the Workers' Education Bureau) began sending its students overseas to study at foreign labor colleges.

Brookwood leadership and faculty expected their students to work in the labor movement, and most did. A survey of the school's graduates found that 80 percent of them worked for labor unions. Brookwood's graduates were so numerous, they formed a sizeable percentage of the mid-level staffers working in American labor unions throughout most of the 20th century.

== AFL conflicts with Brookwood ==
=== AFL control of the WEB ===
Since its founding in 1886, the American Federation of Labor had pursued a highly conservative, pro-business, craft union approach to labor policy. It aligned itself with the pro-business National Civic Federation; largely excluded African Americans, women, and immigrants from its unions; and through the craft union system largely and purposefully excluded most workers from the benefits of union protection. Brookwood's assumption that a new social order was not only needed but was quickly coming conflicted directly with the vision of the AFL.

The AFL was not opposed to worker education, however. Indeed, it sought to use worker education for its own purposes. To improve communication among worker education units of labor unions and independent labor colleges, James Maurer, John Brophy, and J. B. S. Hardman co-founded the Workers' Education Bureau (WEB) on December 31, 1921. Their goal was to reform and liberalize the labor policies of the AFL, popularize the emerging concept of industrial unionism, and instill a greater sense of militancy in the worker-members of the AFL. Maurer was elected president of the WEB.

AFL policy was to subvert the WEB. William Green, then the AFL's Secretary-Treasurer, was personally hostile toward the organization. In 1922, Green began implementing a plan to "burrow from within" and turn the WEB to the AFL's purposes. That same year, the AFL convention approved a cooperative agreement between the WEB and AFL, and in 1924 the AFL asked each of its members unions to contribute 0.5 percent of its annual income to the WEB. As conservative AFL unions began to join the WEB, the organization began shifting away from its progressive policy stands. In 1925, WEB revised its constitution to deny membership to the New York Workers School, the Work People's College, the Rand School of Social Science, and other labor colleges outside the traditional union and AFL structure. In 1926, the AFL recommended that unions double their spending on adult education, and by the end of the year more than 500 international and local AFL unions were affiliated with the WEB.

By 1927, Green's plan of "burrowing from within" had succeeded, and a majority of the WEB's board of directors were conservative AFL labor union leaders. That year, the WEB had adopted resolutions and constitutional amendments that essentially prevented it from concerning itself "in any way with trade union politicies" and required it to function "strictly as an educational and research organization". The WEB's new goal was to educate workers so they could get the most of out of life, even if the economic system they labored under was a poor one.

=== 1923 AFL attack on Brookwood ===
The first AFL attack on Brookwood came in April 1923. AFL President Samuel Gompers delivered a widely reported speech in which he accused the college of belonging to an "interlocking network" of more than 50 "pacifist and revolutionary organizations of a more or less extreme character". Gompers also pointed to the large financial donation made to Brookwood by the American Fund for Public Service (the Garland Fund), which Gompers charged was a Communist Party-dominated organization that was trying to violently overthrow the government of the United States. Garland Fund trustees then gently pointed out that a third of its donations had gone to AFL member unions or their sponsored organizations. The controversy immediately died down.

For many years after Gompers' attack, AFL officials largely ignored Brookwood. In part this was because the college was independent, but in part it was because the AFL believed it could dominate (and thus control) workers' education efforts and turn them to its own purposes through the Workers' Education Bureau.

=== The 1926 AFL investigation of Brookwood ===
Samuel Gompers died on December 13, 1924, and William Green was elected president of the AFL as his successor. Green and the AFL Executive Council were convinced that if the labor movement were to succeed, it had to market itself as a supporter of the capitalist system and partner with business. Every element of progressivism had to be eliminated from the labor movement in order to make this strategy work. It also meant that all progressive criticism of the AFL had to be silenced.

Brookwood's success proved threatening to the AFL, however. On May 1, 1926, Muste announced that Brookwood would embark on a major fund-raising campaign to allow the school to expand its enrollment to 100 students per class. As 1926 came to a close, Muste said the school was also looking to raise $2 million, half of which would be used to expand facilities and enrollment and half of which would be used to create an endowment to enhance the school's financial stability. Brookwood's attempt to raise $2 million alarmed the AFL. If successful, Brookwood (which was turning away as many students as it accepted) would begin graduating enough students to flood the labor movement with staff who would then begin challenging the AFL's conservative labor policies.

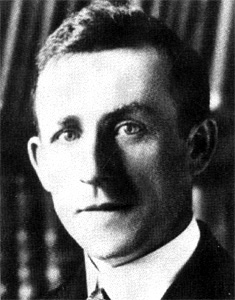
John Brophy, whose insurgent 1926 Mine Workers' presidential candidacy was actively supported by Brookwood faculty and students.

Brookwood proved controversial in 1926 in another way, too. John L. Lewis, president of the United Mine Workers, had largely eliminated opposition to his leadership of the union, and was no longer fighting hard against coal mine owners. Union contracts were being broken, membership was in steep decline, and income was falling very sharply. In June, John Brophy, the mineworker and Brookwood director, forged an alliance with communists in and out of the Mine Workers to defeat Lewis in the upcoming union election. Lewis turned the union's allegedly neutral journal against Brophy, used union dues to pay low-level officials to campaign against Brophy, and red-baited Brophy (who was not a communist himself) mercilessly. Lewis easily defeated Brophy by a vote of 195,000 to 85,000 in December 1926. Several Brookwood faculty and students assisted Brophy in his unsuccessful campaign against Lewis.

These developments alarmed Green. Throughout 1926, he made a number of inquiries into the political beliefs of the Brookwood faculty and the content of Brookwood courses. He particularly focused on the beliefs and activities of faculty member Arthur Calhoun, an avowed Marxist. Green's inquiries confirmed his suspicion that the college was a hotbed of radicalism. In April 1927, Green made a veiled threat against Brookwood in the pages of the AFL's magazine, The American Federationist, arguing that worker education should be a bulwark against rather than a fomenter of radicalism. Events came to a head the following month when Martin Ryan, president of the Brotherhood of Railway Carmen, showed Green a letter from a Canadian official in his union. The letter made additional allegations of radicalism against Brookwood. Green wrote to Ryan in June 1927 acknowledging that Brookwood was "surcharged with radical tendencies". Later that year, Green received letters from five students at Brookwood, who claimed that May Day (then closely associated with the Communist Party) and not Labor Day (the working class holiday promoted by the AFL) was celebrated at Brookwood. The students further claimed that Brookwood had formally celebrated the anniversary of the founding of the Soviet Union; placed pictures of Karl Marx, Vladimir Lenin, and Leon Trotsky throughout the school; and hung red banners (the symbol of the Communist Party) on holidays. The students claimed Brookwood was anti-American, anti-religious, and pro-communist. Muste unwittingly provided Green with additional anti-Brookwood ammunition in April 1928 when he published an article in the left-wing journal Labor Age. In the piece, Muste said working-class people were "mentally sick, twisted, tied up." Workers needed to be "psychoanalyzed...to have their thoughts and feelings laid bare before their own eyes. They know too many things that are not so, they are living a dream world, not a real world, in a world of fears, illusions, fairies, and bogey men". It was a view of workers that the AFL did not share.

=== The 1928 AFL attack on Brookwood ===
Green acted on the information he collected by secretly authorizing AFL Executive Council member Matthew Woll to investigate Brookwood even further. Woll was president of the International Photo-Engravers Union of North America, an AFL vice president, one of the most conservative of all the AFL union leaders, and chairman of the executive committee of the WEB.

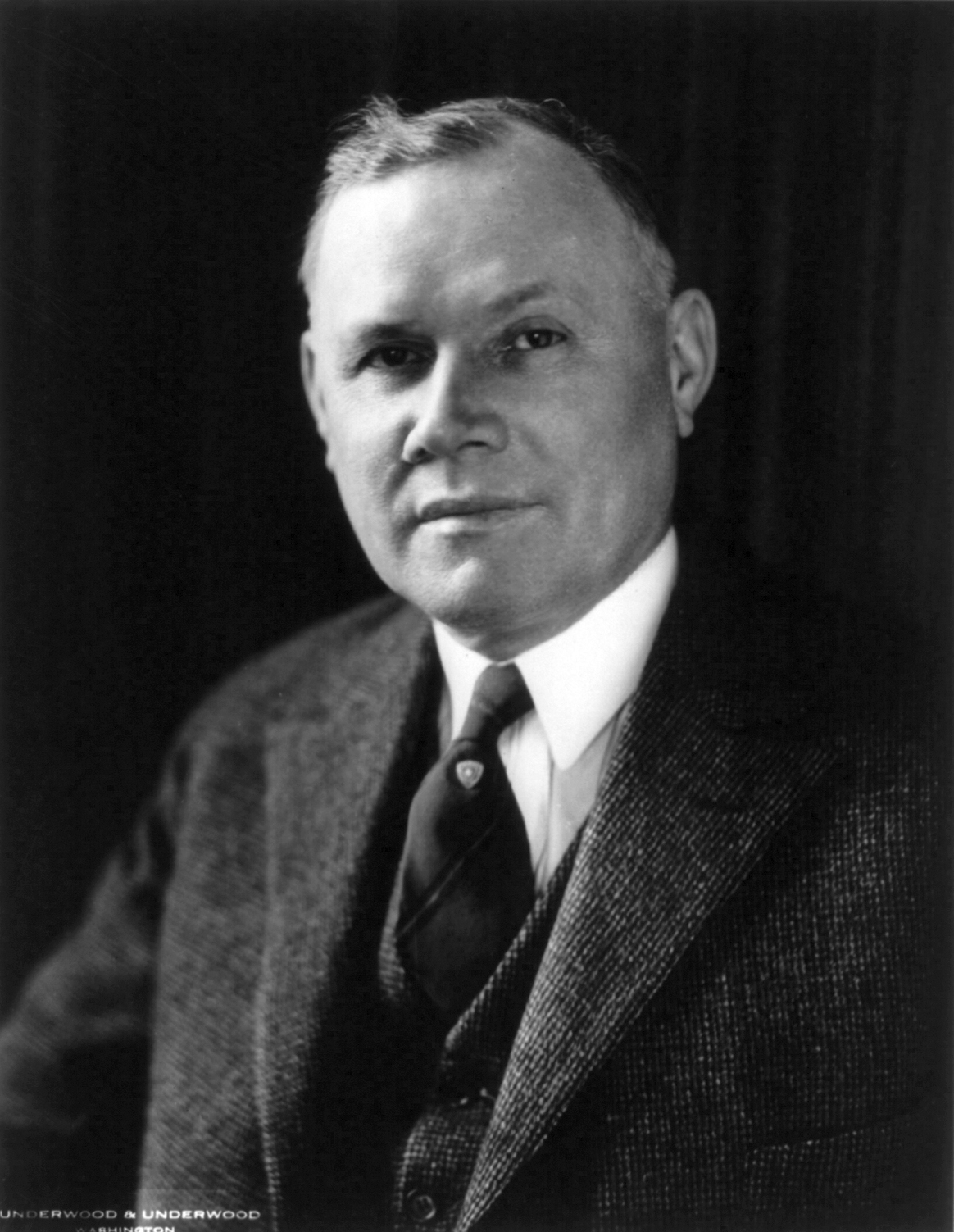
William Green, President of the American Federation of Labor, who was personally antagonistic to Brookwood.

Woll's report was delivered to the AFL Executive Council in August 1928. The report was secret, and no full version has ever been released. Historians have identified, however, that the report concluded that all faculty at Brookwood held left-wing political views, that most of the faculty taught communist philosophies, that three of them served on the faculty of the Worker's School (which was organized and supported by the Communist Party), and that Muste was a fervent communist. The report accused Brookwood of hosting "pro-Soviet demonstrations" and teaching "anti-religious doctrine" and "doctrines contrary to American Federation of Labor policies". On August 8, the AFL leadership advised all its member unions to withdraw moral and financial support for Brookwood.

The Executive Council formally ratified its August 8 announcement on October 29. Muste denounced the Executive Council's action. He said he asked Green for a hearing on the charges many times, but received no response. Green countered that the AFL asked Brookwood to respond to the charges, which it never did. The executive council of the Teachers Union, a left-wing educational union led by Abraham Lefkowitz that represented teachers in the New York City public school system, voted to denounce the AFL's October 29 action.

Brookwood and the AFL agreed to a truce in the war of words in mid-November. The purpose of the truce was to give the school time to respond to the charges contained in the AFL report. As part of the informal agreement, Muste agreed not to press to overturn the Executive Council's resolution on the floor of the upcoming AFL convention. In return, the AFL Executive Council agreed not to publish a supplementary report that contained additional charges against the school.

The AFL convention opened on November 19, 1928. On November 24, the Amalgamated Association of Street and Electric Railway Employees of America asked the Executive Council to make its August 8 report public so that unions could judge for themselves the truthfulness and severity of the allegations made against the school. But the Executive Council declined to do so. The Brookwood issue did not come up before the delegates again until November 27. There was bitter debate on the convention floor regarding the accusations. Green revealed the existence of the letter signed by five students which he had received in 1927, inflaming the delegates. Benjamin Schlesinger, president of the International Ladies' Garment Workers' Union, defended the school by noting that it had donated $100,000 to the union during a 1926 strike. James B. Rankin, president of the International Union of Mine, Mill, and Smelter Workers, tried to undermine the Woll report by declaring Brookwood convicted by "uncertain evidence" and "without a trial or official charges".

The debate over Brookwood lasted until November 29, the final day of the convention. That day, the Executive Council re-approved its October 29 resolution. That same day, in a nearly unanimous vote, the delegates to the AFL convention approved Woll's unreleased report and the Executive Council's October 29 resolution.

The AFL convention's action was also denounced by many. John Dewey and author and workers' education expert Marius Hansome defended Brookwood publicly after the convention. Many AFL unions tried for some time to continue their support for Brookwood, arguing that the school deserved a full, public hearing on the charges. In February 1929, 35 Brookwood alumni—including several international union vice presidents, labor journal editors, the heads of labor colleges, and state federation officials—wrote a letter to William Green protesting the AFL's action. But neither Green nor the AFL Executivge Council were moved. To them, the issue was not about academic freedom but the right of the AFL to maintain control over its own policies. Brookwood, with AFL member support, had challenged those policies, and it was the AFL's right to force the withdrawal of that support.

In January 1929, Brookwood Labor College was expelled from the WEB, and Muste removed from the WEB's executive board. Three months later, at its April 1929 convention, the WEB adopted two new constitutional amendments aimed at Brookwood. The first limited membership only to those organizations directly affiliated with the AFL and its member unions. The second amendment made it a goal of the WEB to partner on worker education solely with established colleges and universities. The goal of the amendments, William Green said, was to deny WEB's support to any organization "that ridicules our policy and undermines the work of our leaders". In response to these changes, James Maurer stepped down as president of the WEB. He was succeeded by Thomas Burke, Secretary of the United Association of Journeymen Plumbers. Delegates from Brookwood Labor College walked out of the WEB's convention after Matthew Woll led the delegates in rejecting all of the recommendations Maurer proposed, and enacting a series of changes to the selection of the Executive Committee, issuance of election calls, and selection of convention delegates intended to establish tighter control by the AFL over the organization.

== Financial woes and Muste's departure ==
In the wake of the AFL attack on Brookwood, the college's director, A.J. Muste, began pushing for the abandonment of Brookwood's strictly educational mission in favor of training strike organizers. This caused a split in the Brookwood faculty. Muste also began thinking of establishing an organization, distinct from both the AFL and the Communist Party, to organize workers into industrial unions. Muste's political views were changing as well, and moving leftward. By 1931, Muste believed he was going to lead a social revolt in the United States that would not only build a new, militant labor movement but also lead to violent overthrow of the existing capitalist system and establishment of a socialist workers' paradise. Board member Fannia Cohn and faculty member David J. Saposs, who both disliked Muste's new political views, fought to preserve Brookwood as a non-political school.

=== A new labor union center ===
Muste began leading Brookwood into controversy quietly enough. On February 23, 1929, he endorsed a proposal by the Pittsburgh Labor College which called for a "militant" trade union labor party. But Muste moved beyond endorsement, and quickly tried to implement the proposal. On March 2, Muste outlined a plan of action at a meeting of the League for Industrial Democracy. He proposed establishing a network of communications among progressive leaders, organizations, and other groups within the American Federation of Labor, with the goal of creating a "militant though informal" national movement. The key to this network was the WEB, he said. However, Muste said, any new organization must denounce communism.

Muste's plans for a "militant though informal" network took concrete form on May 26, 1929, when 151 union members, labor leaders, and socialists meeting in New York City agreed to form the Conference for Progressive Labor Action (CPLA). At the meeting were several Brookwood directors and faculty, including Budenz, Golden, Hartman, A.J. Kennedy, Lefkowitz, Maurer, and Muste. The CPLA's founders agreed to use the journal Labor Age to advocate for industrial unionism, labor militancy, the five-day work week, and a program of social insurance. The CPLA also advocated a planned economy and government ownership of national resources, and strongly rejected communism. Muste was elected national chairman of the CPLA. On June 3, the Brookwood board of directors approved a resolution supporting the CPLA, demanding more militant labor policies, opposing the two existing political parties, and supporting progressive workers' education. The AFL denounced the CPLA as dual unionism.

Despite this action, many of Brookwood's board members did not support Muste or the CPLA, and a majority of the faculty opposed the board's action and what the CPLA was trying to do. Muste's political drift leftward encouraged some Brookwood faculty to take even more radical stands. Veteran faculty member Arthur Calhoun, who had long held communist views, now began advocating that Brookwood formally adopt a communist philosophy to the exclusion of all other views. Deeply alarmed, the rest of the Brookwood faculty unanimously asked the Brookwood board of directors not to rehire Calhoun when his contract expired in early June 1929. Calhoun (who had asked to be released from tenure in 1927 to pursue other jobs) denied he was a member of the Communist Party. But when asked if his communist views would allow him to would continue serving on the Brookwood faculty while also seeking to destroy the institution, Calhoun answered they would. On June 9, the board declined to renew Calhoun's contract, ending his employment by the school.

The Brookwood board's strong support for the CPLA and the negative press associated with the public disclosure of Dr. Calhoun's political views led to the loss of support for the college. In August 1929, the New York State Federation of Labor withdrew its financial support for Brookwood after extensive and bitter debate. But delegates felt the evidence against Brookwood was overwhelming, and in the end the resolution implementing the decision passed by a comfortable margin.

=== 1932 financial crisis ===
In October 1929, Brookwood college opened with just six full-time faculty but a full class of 37 students. The faculty included Muste (teaching foreign labor history, public speaking, and history), Josephine Colby (teaching English and parliamentary law), David J. Saposs (teaching American labor history), Helen G. Norton (teaching journalism), and Mark Starr (teaching economics). Instructors were added as needed for correspondence courses, and celebrated author Sinclair Lewis agreed to lecture during the term. The college also began expanding that year, offering its first extension programs. Tom Tippett was hired to direct the extension effort.

Brookwood admitted 41 students in its fall 1930 term. But 24 of the 41 were from overseas, a significant change from previous years. When these students graduated in May 1931, Brookwood celebrated not only its tenth anniversary but also its 200th graduate.

In March 1931, in the middle of its 1930-1931 term, Brookwood Labor College established a national clearinghouse for information on worker education. It was believed to be not only the first but also the only national clearinghouse of its kind.

But there were signs that not all was well at Brookwood. Expansion was coming as the Great Depression deepened. In addition, racial tension now erupted at the school. In 1932, Mark Starr led a Brookwood Players theater group on a trip through the South. The Jim Crow laws of the Southern states which the troupe visited required the troupe's lone black student to stay in racially segregated, substandard housing; eat in the blacks-only section of restaurants (or use a separate restaurant entirely); use racially segregated toilet facilities, and more. Starr did not challenge these laws. White students complained bitterly to Muste about Starr's lack of militancy, and Muste reprimanded Starr for "jim-crowing" the black student.

A major funding crisis also hit the school in 1932. Muste was spending more and more time on CPLA business and far less effort on raising money for the college. He also diverted college resources to CPLA activities. In 1932, he instructed Tippett to write a play dramatizing the plight of Southern textile workers, who were facing strikebreakers, employer-sponsored violence, and attacks by the National Guard. This play, Mill Shadows, was taken at Brookwood expense on a nine-day, 800-mile (1,300 km) tour of the South. The money raised did not return to Brookwood, but rather was donated to striking textile workers in the South Carolina Piedmont. The lack of income and diversion of resources created a $10,000 deficit ($235,976 in 2025 dollars), and Brookwood nearly closed. John Dewey, Sinclair Lewis, and 80 others printed a public letter in the left-wing magazine The Nation in late November, pleading for money. Some funds were raised, and by reducing the number of faculty and significantly cutting back the extension program the crisis passed.

=== Departure of Muste ===
Muste's evolving political views and the increasing amount of time he spent on CPLA activities created much dissent within the Brookwood faculty. Shortly after the creation of the CPLA, Muste adopted Marxism as a philosophy, which caused a major split among the faculty. Muste's pacifist views were also changing, and he now advocated a qualified approval of labor union violence. In May 1932, Muste proposed that Brookwood become a "training base" for "CPLA fighters". The faculty rejected the plan. Many Brookwood faculty feared that Muste's evolving political views were heading toward Trotskyism (a theory of Marxism advocated by Leon Trotsky), and that he would drag the CPLA and Brookwood into the communist political camp with him. Others feared that Brookwood would lose its nonpartisan reputation, which they felt was its biggest and best selling point.

As Brookwood's financial crisis worsened in the fall of 1932, a political crisis over Muste's activities also emerged. At a meeting with faculty on October 22, Muste responded to a question by asserting that his CPLA work was more important than Brookwood. Nine days later, a majority of faculty signed a letter addressed to the board of directors asking that some other faculty member take over the director's duties and asking the board to reaffirm Brookwood's nonpartisan nature. When Muste learned of the letter's content, he accused the signers of cowardice and refusing to take part in the emerging "revolutionary movement".

The political crisis at Brookwood culminated in March 1933. The board of directors called a meeting at which Phil Ziegler presided. It began about March 2 and lasted three or four days. The board quickly cleared away its business: Maurer was reelected president, and Fannia Cohn was elected vice president. The board and Muste then spent several days discussing the future of Brookwood Labor College, the CPLA, the economic situation, and the best political response to take to the depression. Mark Starr led the group criticizing Muste. Many board members also expressed criticism of Tippett, who like Muste had moved away from a commitment to broad educational goals and toward a concept of Brookwood as a strike organizer training center for a nascent labor party and industrial union center. Muste offered a resolution to have Brookwood begin training a "revolutionary vanguard", but the board rejected the measure 15 to 4. The board then passed a resolution asking Muste to stay on as director, but only if he resigned as head of the CPLA. Muste refused, and both he and Tippett resigned on March 5, 1933.

Muste's resignation nearly crippled Brookwood. Six administrators and 19 of the school's current class of 28 students walked out as well. (Another source says there were just 23 students.) This constituted most of the administrative staff, and nearly all the student body. Among the students who walked out were all three of the school's African American students. They were angry at Starr's role in the opposing Muste, and upset at losing Muste (who adamantly opposed racial discrimination).

The board appointed J. C. Kennedy as the school's acting director while they searched for a permanent replacement for Muste. This appointment was criticized by many white and black students because Kennedy believed that African Americans must improve their economic status before being accepted as equals by whites or being accepted in white-only unions. In an era of rampant discrimination against blacks, this seemed position seemed senseless to African Americans. Brookwood reopened on March 8 with just nine students.

On June 5, 1933, the Brookwood board of directors appointed Tucker P. Smith the new director of Brookwood Labor College. Smith said he would refocus Brookwood on education, with a particular emphasis on semi-skilled and unskilled workers and the unemployed. He also said Brookwood would return to a full educational program, which would involve not only resident training but also field activities, Chautauquas, summer institutes, and publications.

== Closure ==
Brookwood stayed open four years after Muste departed. In many ways, the school returned to normal. There were 104 applications for admission in the fall of 1933, of which just 35 were accepted. These students came from 13 states and four countries, and represented 22 industries. Twenty-nine students graduated in April 1934.

Brookwood enrolled a class of 32 for the 1934–1935 school year. The school also had more than 200 enrolled in its adult education courses in economics and public speaking in New York City. James Maurer was reelected as president that year, and three individuals were hired as new faculty: Roy Reuther in extension studies; Lawrence Rogin in journalism and as editor of the Brookwood Review; and Ethel Lurie as librarian and tutor.

Enrollment dropped sharply in the school's last two years. Just 20 students enrolled for the 1935-1936 term, including two refugees from Nazi Germany. Despite the lower enrollment, the school added two new faculty, Dr. Lazare Teper and John Martindale. It also hired special instructors to teach a wide variety of courses. These included Luigi Antonini, Osmond Fraenkel, Jack Lever, and Frank Palmer.

Enrollment did not improve the following year. Brookwood enrolled just 19 students in the 1936-1937 term, which ended prematurely in March 1937.

In the later 1930s, Joel I. Seidman became director of Brookwood Labor College.

On November 21, 1937, the Brookwood Labor College board of directors voted to suspend classes and close the college. Brookwood's directors and historians have offered various reasons for the college's demise. The board blamed the Great Depression (which led to significant reductions in union membership and thus union dues) and the diversion of money to union organizing campaigns rather than worker education. The board also blamed the rift in the AFL, which led to the establishment of the Congress of Industrial Organizations (CIO) in 1935. Neither trade federation wanted to appear to be patronizing Brookwood, the board claimed, and thus few trade unions sent their members there. The board also blamed the rapid rise in the number of "little Brookwoods"—the education and theater programs of the Works Progress Administration (a federal agency which in part employed authors, musicians, and actors), unions (especially the CIO), and traditional colleges and universities.

Historians offer a wide range of reasons for Brookwood's demise as well. Many cite Brookwood's financial problems, with some specifically linking them to the Great Depression while others link them to withdrawal of support by the AFL. Some attribute it to both. The internal political tensions within Brookwood are also cited as a primary cause. Charles F. Howlett, author of a history of Brookwood, concludes that it was competition between the AFL and CIO that undermined the college. Historian Eric Leif Davin provides a more detailed version of this argument. He concludes that Brookwood continued to support the CPLA, while other unions (notably those in the more militant CIO) supported the Democratic Party and President Franklin D. Roosevelt. Faced with the choice of supporting Roosevelt or Brookwood, these unions gave their financial support to Roosevelt. Educational historian Joseph Kett cites declining enrollment as the primary cause of the college's closure, although the reason for the decline is not stated, while labor historian Frances Ryan agrees with Brookwood's directors that competition from a wide array of worker education efforts was the key reason. Labor historian Susan Stone Wong argues that the real was uninspired institutional leadership and indifference by labor leaders, while social historian Neil Hamilton cites, among other things, attacks by big business.

=== Aftermath ===
After the college's closure, Tucker Smith was hired by the United Auto Workers to lead their worker education department.

The Brookwood campus sat abandoned for four years after the school's closure. The board deeded the property to a successor body, Stanroy Estates, Inc. In August 1942, Stanroy Estates sold the campus to the Norwegian Shipping and Trade Mission for $34,000. The Norwegian government renamed the campus renamed Eidsvold, and transformed it into a rest home for Norwegian merchant sailors whose ships were being repaired in New York City.

Eidsvold was sold in 1951 to developer Albert Stone for $110,000.

== Theatre group ==
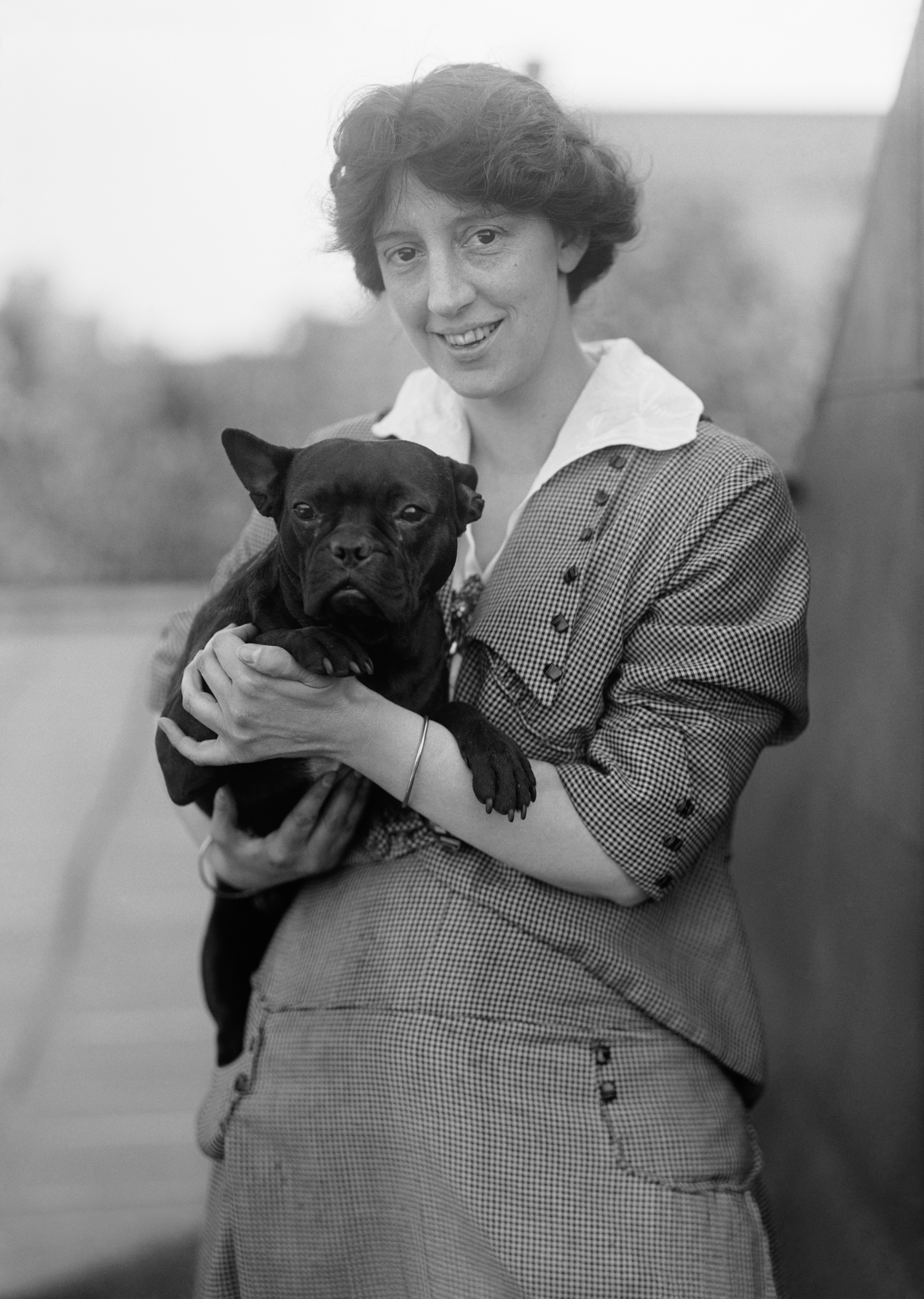
The first director of the drama department, Hazel MacKaye

Brookwood Labor College was noted for its exceptionally strong theater program. The drama troupe, the Brookwood Labor Players, toured the United States and received acclaim in the mid-1930s. The core of the program was a course, "Labor Drama", which was offered one hour each week. The course taught such basic skills as acting, directing, playwriting, and set design. But it also emphasized the importance of dramatic themes such as working-class problems and collective action as solutions to those problems. Singing was also part of the theater program, and included the teaching of standard labor songs. An adjunct of the drama program was the radio program The Brookwood Hour. The hour-long program aired Thursdays on WEVD in New York City.

Brookwood began teaching drama in 1923. Hazel MacKaye was the first director. MacKaye left in 1926 to run a similar program for the United Mine Workers, and was replaced by Jasper Deeter, a director who had worked with Nobel Prize-winning playwright Eugene O'Neill. Deeter directed several plays for The Workers' Theater after its formation in 1925, and often had Brookwood players appear in Workers' Theater productions.

Among the more celebrated plays produced by Brookwood Labor College were Peggy, Starvation Army, Mill Shadows, Miner, Gun Cotton, and Sit-Down (which portrayed the Flint Sit-Down Strike of 1936-1937). Some 2,800 people saw Mill Shadows when it toured Hartford, Connecticut; Allentown, Pennsylvania; Philadelphia, Pennsylvania; New Brunswick, New Jersey; Baltimore, Maryland; and Washington, D.C., in 1932. The play stayed in production for four years, and more than 30,000 people saw it.

In October 1936, Nicholas Ray was hired to run Brookwood's theater group. Ray saw a performance of Sit-Down and enjoyed it. Songwriter Earl Robinson was hired as composer. Ray and Robinson secured contracts which paid them $120 a month for eight months. Working only two hours a day, Ray crafted a troupe from the students at the college, and used improvisation techniques he'd learned at the Theatre of Action to help craft plays. The goal was to take the troupe on the road, performing at various union conventions and functions. But with Brookwood failing financially, they were released from their contracts after just three months.

Even during Brookwood's waning days, the labor program remained strong. In 1936, there were three full companies of Brookwood Players on tour, which produced plays in 100 cities in 23 states.

Two of the Brookwood plays, The Miners and Mill Shadows, remain critically acclaimed 75 years after they were first written. The two plays were collected in Lee Pappas' 2010 book of critically acclaimed labor plays.

== Publications ==
The college had a publishing arm, Brookwood Labor Publications, whose works included:

- The Labor Movement Today (1934)
- A Labor Party for America? (1936)
- The Company Union (1936)
- Strikes Under the New Deal (1935-7?)
- Methods of War Resistance (practicum) (1939?)

== Impact ==
Brookwood Labor College left a significant legacy in the American labor movement. Scholar Susan Kates notes that "no labor college proved more successful in attracting large numbers of students and setting the tone for worker education in America than Brookwood Labor College". Its curriculum shaped hundreds of programs nationwide. The school graduated more than 500 students in 16 years, and many of its graduates played prominent roles in national labor unions in mid-century. One sign of Brookwood's influence is just how much it changed American labor unions. Many of Brookwood's beliefs—mass unionization, unionization of skilled and semi-skilled workers, an end to gender and racial discrimination, support for social insurance programs—were later adopted by mainstream labor.

During the school's brief lifespan, Brookwood was widely known as "labor's Harvard", and noted author Sinclair Lewis called it "the only self-respecting, keen, alive educational institution I have ever known..." Labor historian Linda Eisenmann notes that, after 75 years, scholars still consider Brookwood one of the most influential labor colleges in American history. Labor historian Frances Ryan characterized it as "one of the most successful experiments in worker education in U.S. labor history".

Brookwood's reputation is based largely on its curriculum. Ryan says its curriculum was unique as a model of progressive education methods. The school also pioneered the extension course and the correspondence course.

== Notable students ==
Below is a partial list of notable students who attended Brookwood Labor College:

- Ella Baker, civil rights activist
- Harry Bellaver, stage, film and television actor
- Len De Caux, publicity director of the Congress of Industrial Organizations
- Elizabeth Hawes, union organizer and fashion designer
- Anna Pauline "Pauli" Murray, civil and women's rights activist and the first black woman ordained an Episcopal priest.
- Rose Finkelstein Norwood, labor organizer, president of the Boston Women's Trade Union League
- Joseph Ozanic, founder of the Progressive Miners of America
- Rose Pesotta, vice president of the ILGWU
- Roy Reuther, prominent international labor organizer with the United Automobile Workers
- Sophie Reuther, international labor organizer with the United Automobile Workers
- Walter Reuther, President of the United Automobile Workers and President of the Congress of Industrial Organizations
- Floria Pinkney, international labor organizer with the International Ladies' Garment Workers' Union

== See also ==
- Labour Party (disambiguation) for various political movements associated with trade unionism or labor colleges
- Rand School of Social Science (1906)
- Work People's College (1907)
- New York Workers School (1923):
  - New Workers School (1929)
  - Jefferson School of Social Science (1944)
- Highlander Research and Education Center (formerly Highlander Folk School) (1932)
  - Commonwealth College (Arkansas) (1923-1940)
  - Southern Appalachian Labor School (since 1977)
- San Francisco Workers' School (1934)
  - California Labor School (formerly Tom Mooney Labor School) (1942)
- Continuing education

== Bibliography ==
- Allen, Devere. Adventurous Americans. New York: Farrar & Rinehart, 1932.
- Altenbaugh, Richard J. "'The Children and the Instruments of a Militant Labor Progressivism': Brookwood Labor College and the American Labor College Movement of the 1920s and 1930s." History of Education Quarterly. 23:4 (Winter 1983): 395-411.
- Andrews, Gregg. Thyra J. Edwards: Black Activist in the Global Freedom Struggle. Columbia, Mo.: University of Missouri Press, 2011.
- Appelbaum, Patricia Faith. Kingdom to Commune: Protestant Pacifist Culture Between World War I and the Vietnam Era. Chapel Hill, N.C.: University of North Carolina Press, 2009.
- Barrow, Clyde W. "Playing Workers: Proletarian Drama In the Curriculum of American Labor Colleges, 1921-37." In Paying the Piper: Causes and Consequences of Art Patronage. Judith H. Balfe, ed. Urbana, Ill.: University of Illinois Press, 1993.
- Brooks, Thomas R. Clint: A Biography of a Labor Intellectual, Clinton S. Golden. New York: Atheneum, 1978.
- "Brookwood Labor College." In Encyclopedia of American Social Movements. Vol. 2. Immanuel Ness, ed. Armonk, N.Y.: Sharpe Reference, 2004.
- Carew, Anthony. Labour Under the Marshall Plan: The Politics of Productivity and the Marketing of Management Science. Manchester, U.K.: Manchester University Press, 1987.
- Clark, Paul F. The Miners' Fight for Democracy: Arnold Miller and the Reform of the United Mine Workers. Ithaca, N.Y.: New York State School of Industrial and Labor Relations, 1981.
- Cottrell, Robert C. Roger Nash Baldwin and the American Civil Liberties Union. New York: Columbia University Press, 2000.
- Craig, Robert H. Religion and Radical Politics: An Alternative Christian Tradition in the United States. Philadelphia: Temple University Press, 1992.
- Cummins, E.E. and De Vyver, Frank T. The Labor Problem in the United States. New York: D. Van Nostrand Co., 1947.
- Danielson, Leila (2015). American Gandhi: A. J. Muste and the History of Radicalism in the Twentieth Century. Philadelphia: University of Pennsylvania Press. Archived from the original on May 28, 2014.
- Davin, Eric Leif. Crucible of Freedom: Workers' Democracy in the Industrial Heartland, 1914-1960. Lanham, Md.: Lexington Books, 2010.
- De Caux, Len. Labor Radical: From the Wobblies to CIO, a Personal History. Boston: Beacon Press, 1970.
- Denning, Michael. The Cultural Front: The Laboring of American Culture in the Twentieth Century. London: Verso, 2000.
- Dewey, John. The Later Works of John Dewey, 1925-1953. Jo Ann Boydston and Sidney Ratner, eds. Carbondale, Ill.: Southern Illinois University Press, 2008.
- Dubofsky, Melvyn and Van Tine, Warren. John L. Lewis: A Biography. Reprint ed. Champaign, Ill.: University of Illinois Press, 1992.
- Dunbar, Anthony P. Against the Grain. Charlottesville, Va.: University Press of Virginia, 1981.
- Eisenmann, Linda. "Labor Colleges." In Historical Dictionary of Women's Education in the United States. Linda Eisenmann, ed. Westport, Conn.: Greenwood Press, 1998.
- Fletcher, Meredith. Digging People Up for Coal: A History of Yallourn. Carlton, Vic., Australia: Melbourne University Press, 2002.
- Foner, Philip S. History of the Labor Movement in the United States. Vol. 9: The T.U.E.L. to the End of the Gompers Era. New York: International Publishers, 1991.
- Foner, Philip S. Women and the American Labor Movement: From the First Trade Unions to the Present. New York: Free Press, 1982.
- Hamilton, Neil A. "Muste, A.J." In American Social Leaders and Activists. New York: Facts On File, 2002.
- Hendrickson, Mark. American Labor and Economic Citizenship: New Capitalism From World War I to the Great Depression. New York: Cambridge University Press, 2013.
- Hentoff, Nat. Peace Agitator: The Story of A.J. Muste. New York: A.J. Muste Memorial Institute, 1982
- Hightower-Langston, Donna. A to Z of American Women Leaders and Activists. New York: Facts on File, 2002.
- Holloway, Jonathan Scott. Confronting the Veil: Abram Harris, Jr., E. Franklin Frazier, and Ralph Bunche, 1919-1941. Chapel Hill, N.C.: University of North Carolina Press, 2002.
- Howlett, Charles F. "A.J. Muste: Portrait of a Twentieth-Century Pacifist." In The Human Tradition in America Between the Wars, 1920-1945. Donald W. Whisenhunt, ed. Wilmington, Del.: Scholarly Resources, 2002.
- Howlett, Charles F. "Brookwood Labor College." In Protest, Power, and Change: An Encyclopedia of Nonviolent Action from ACT-UP to Women's Suffrage, Roger S. Powers, William B. Vogele, Christopher Kruegler, and Ronald M. McCarthy, eds. Florence, Ky.: Taylor & Francis, 1997.
- Howlett, Charles F. "Fincke, William M." In American National Biography. Supplement 2. Mark C. Carnes, ed. New York: Oxford University Press, 2005.
- Howlett, Charles F. and Morris, Ian M. Books, Not Bombs: Teaching Peace Since the Dawn of the Republic. Charlotte, N.C.: Information Age Publishing, 2010.
- International Brotherhood of Electrical Workers. Proceedings of the Nineteenth Biennial Convention of the International Brotherhood of Electrical Workers. Washington, D.C.: IBEW, 1927.
- Kates, Susan. Activist Rhetorics and American Higher Education, 1885-1937. Carbondale, Ill.: Southern Illinois University Press, 2001.
- Katz, Daniel. All Together Different: Yiddish Socialists, Garment Workers, and the Labor Roots of Multiculturalism. New York: New York University Press, 2011.
- Kett, Joseph F. The Pursuit of Knowledge Under Difficulties: From Self-Improvement to Adult Education in America, 1750-1990. Stanford, Calif.: Stanford University Press, 1994.
- Kosek, Joseph Kip. Acts of Conscience: Christian Nonviolence and Modern American Democracy. New York: Columbia University Press, 2009.
- Lazzari, Marie. Twentieth-Century Literary Criticism. Vol. 54. Detroit, Mich.: Gale Research, 1994.
- Lecklider, Aaron. Inventing the Egghead: The Battle Over Brainpower in American Culture. Philadelphia: University of Pennsylvania Press, 2013.
- Levine, Arthur. "Brookwood Remembered." In Learning From Change: Landmarks in Teaching and Learning in Higher Education From 'Change' Magazine, 1969-1999. Deborah DeZure, ed. Sterling, Va.: Stylus Publishing, 2000.
- Lichtenstein, Nelson (1995). Walter Reuther: The Most Dangerous Man in Detroit. Urbana, Ill.: University of Illinois Press. ISBN 9780252066269.
- London, Steven H.; Tarr, Elvira R.; and Wilson, Joseph F. The Re-Education of the American Working Class. New York: Greenwood Press, 1990.
- Lynd, Staughton. "A.J. Muste." In The American Radical. Mary Jo Buhle, Paul Buhle, and Harvey J. Kaye, eds. New York: Routledge, 2013.
- Magat, Richard. Unlikely Partners: Philanthropic Foundations and the Labor Movement. Ithaca, N.Y.: ILR Press, 1999.
- Mantooth, Wes. "You Factory Folks who Sing this Rhyme Will Surely Understand": Culture, Ideology, and Action in the Gastonia Novels of Myra Page, Grace Lumpkin, and Olive Dargan. New York: CRC Press, 2006.
- McGilligan, Patrick. Nicholas Ray: The Glorious Failure of an American Director. New York: It Books, 2011.
- Morris, James Oliver. The Origins of the C.I.O.: A Study of Conflict Within the Labor Movement, 1921-1938. Ann Arbor, Mich.: University of Michigan, 1954.
- Muste, A.J. The Essays of A.J. Muste. Nat Hentoff, ed. Indianapolis: Bobbs-Merrill Co., 1967.
- "Muste, A.J." In American Social Leaders and Activists. Neil A. Hamilton, ed. New York: Facts On File, 2002.
- Nash, Al. Ruskin College: A Challenge to Adult and Labor Education. Ithaca, N.Y.: Cornell University, 1981.
- Orleck, Annelise. Common Sense and A Little Fire: Women and Working-Class Politics in the United States, 1900-1965. Chapel Hill, N.C.: University of North Carolina Press, 1995.
- Paulston, Rolland G. Other Dreams, Other Schools: Folk Colleges in Social and Ethnic Movements. Pittsburgh: University of Pittsburgh, 1980.
- Phelan, Craig. William Green: Biography of a Labor Leader. Albany, N.Y.: State University Press of New York, 1989.
- Ransby, Barbara. Ella Baker and the Black Freedom Movement: A Radical Democratic Vision. Chapel Hill, N.C.: University of North Carolina Press, 2003.
- Robinson, James W. "The Expulsion of Brookwood Labor College from the Workers' Education Bureau." Labour History. November 1968: 64-69.
- Robinson, Jo Ann. Abraham Went Out: A Biography of A.J. Muste. Philadelphia: Temple University Press, 1981.
- Ryan, Francis. "Brookwood Labor College." In Encyclopedia of U.S. Labor and Working-Class History. Vol. 1. Eric Arnesen, ed. New York: CRC Press, 2007.
- Ryan, Francis. "Education, Labor." In Encyclopedia of U.S. Labor and Working-Class History. Vol. 1. Eric Arnesen, ed. New York: CRC Press, 2007.
- Samson, Gloria Garrett. The American Fund for Public Service: Charles Garland and Radical Philanthropy, 1922-1941. Westport, Conn.: Greenwood Press, 1996.
- Saposs, David J. Investigation of Un-American Propaganda Activities in the United States. Vol. 6. Special Committee on Un-American Activities. House of Representatives. 78th Cong., 1st sess. Washington, D.C.: U.S. Government Printing Office, 1943.
- "Saposs, David J." In American National Biography: Supplement 2. Paul F. Betz and Mark C. Carnes, eds. New York: Oxford University Press, 2005.
- Special Committee on Un-American Activities. Investigation of Un-American Propaganda Activities in the United States. Vol. 1. House of Representatives. 75th Cong., 3d sess. Washington, D.C.: U.S. Government Printing Office, 1938.
- Stapleford, Thomas A. The Cost of Living in America: A Political History of Economic Statistics, 1880-2000. New York: Cambridge University Press, 2009.
- Stolberg, Mary M. Bridging the River of Hatred: The Pioneering Efforts of Detroit Police Commissioner George Edwards. Detroit: Wayne State University Press, 2002.
- Storch, Randi. Working Hard for the American Dream: Workers and Their Unions, World War I to the Present. Chichester, West Sussex, U.K.: John Wiley & Sons, 2013.
- Tracy, James. Direct Action: Radical Pacifism From the Union Eight to the Chicago Seven. Chicago, Ill.: University of Chicago Press, 1996.
- Tyler, Gus. Look for the Union Label: A History of the International Ladies' Garment Workers' Union. Armonk, N.Y.: M.E. Sharpe, 1995.
- Weinberg, Carl R. "Brophy, John." In Encyclopedia of U.S. Labor and Working-Class History. Vol. 1. Eric Arnesen, ed. New York: CRC Press, 2007.
- Weir, Robert E. "Labor Colleges." In Workers in America: A Historical Encyclopedia. Santa Barbara, Calif.: ABC-CLIO, 2013.
- Williams, Jay. Stage Left. New York: Scribner's 1974.
- Wolfe, Margaret Ripley. "Eleanor Cooperhaver Anderson and the Industrial Department of the National Board YWCA: Toward a New Social Order in Dixie." In The Human Tradition in the New South. James C. Klotter, ed. Lanham, Md.: Rowman & Littlefield Publishers, 2005.
- Wong, Susan Stone. "Cohn, Fannia Mary." In Notable American Women: The Modern Period: A Biographical Dictionary. Barbara Sicherman, Carol Hurd Green, Ilene Kantrov, and Harriet Walker, eds. Cambridge: The Belknap Press of Harvard University Press, 1980.
