= Floria Pinkney =

USA trade union activist

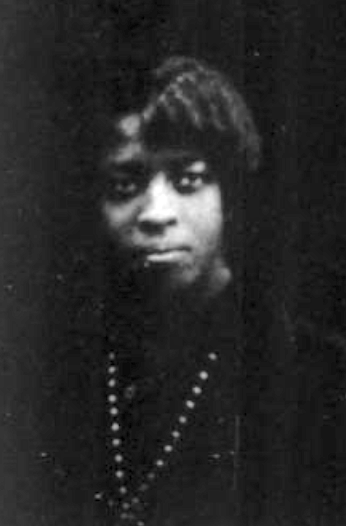
- Floria Pinkney, from a 1926 publication
- Born: 1903 (age 122–123); Connecticut
- Education: Brockwood Labor College
- Occupations: Garment worker, union organizer, and activist

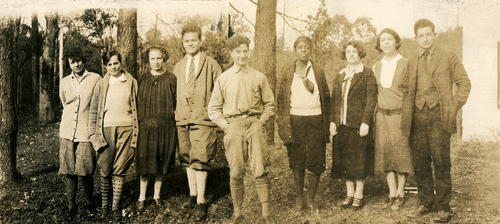
Floria Pinkney (fourth from right) pictured with classmates at Brookwood Labor College

Floria Pinkney (1903 – after May 1984) was a Progressive Era Black garment worker and union activist and leader from Brooklyn, New York. She was the first African-American woman to hold a leadership role as an organizer within the International Ladies Garment Workers Union (ILGWU). As a legacy dressmaker, Pinkney was involved in the garment industry throughout her life.

== Early life and education ==
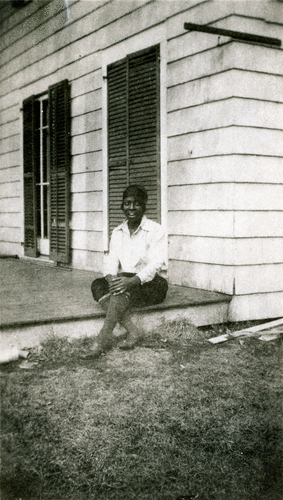
Floria Pinkney pictured at Brookwood Labor College in 1926.

Pinkney's parents were both originally from Florida and they migrated to Connecticut at the turn of the century. Pinkney's mother was a self-employed dressmaker. Pinkney was born in Connecticut in 1903. Shortly after Pinkney's birth, her then widowed mother moved the family to Brooklyn. Before working in the garment industry, Pinkney attended Manhattan Trade School for Girls. There, she was taught skills including sewing machine mechanics, sewing techniques, and basic academic skills like writing.

In 1925, Pinkney received a scholarship to Brookwood Labor College, sponsored by the American Fund for Public Service (AFPS), commonly known as the Garland Fund, which supported radical political causes. She also received scholarship from the NAACP. The scholarship from AFPS gave Pinkney the ability to learn more about organizing and later on apply it to helping black workers succeed in the garment industry and fight prejudice.

Her scholarship at Brookwood was extended two years due to her academic success, and Pinkney was recognized as a class speaker at graduation. Upon graduating, Pinkney become the first Black woman to graduate from Brookwood Labor College. Pinkney also studied at the Bryn Mawr Summer School for Women Workers, where she was one of the first five Black students to be admitted and the International People’s College in Denmark.

In 1930, Pinkney won an award from the New York School of Social Work to do a 6 month Fellowship at the University of Copenhagen. This fellowship focused on work that was being done in Denmark in adult education and social organization. In 1984, Pinkney attended a reunion of the Bryn Mawr Summer School for Women Workers.

== Activism ==
Pinkney joined the International Ladies' Garment Workers' Union (ILGWU) in the 1920s and was quickly identified as a promising leader. She worked for several years before attending Brockwood Labor College. After graduating, she returned to the industry she was quickly appointed to into leadership positions. Among other roles, Pinkney served as Special Organizer for ILGWU in 1929.

Pinkney was instrumental in the ILGWU's September 1929 drive to enroll black garment workers. She spoke alongside A. Philip Randolph, who lead the Brotherhood of Sleeping Car Porters and ILGWU Vice President Julius Hochman at St. Luke's in Harlem. Randolph endorsed Pinkney as an organizer for the ILGWU, calling her "a capable young woman". She worked beyond the garment district and was active in both the Harlem and Brooklyn communities.

Pinkney was on the board of managers for the Ashland Place YWCA in Brooklyn. She led YWCA branch’s Industrial Assembly and represented the Ashland Place Y at a regional conference in Trenton in 1926. She attended the 1930 YWCA Industrial Assemblies Convention in Detroit, where she was selected to represent the Industrial Assembly in Geneva, Switzerland. Pinkney continued her advocacy work through the Women's Trade Union League (WTUL), specifically working with the Laundry Workers Union.

In 1933, she was barred from the Cairo Hotel in Washington, D.C., and other delegates to the same labor conference marched in protest. Also in 1933, Congress passed NIRA, which led to a large increase in union membership, because of more protection of employee rights, and ultimately giving unions more power and visibility. In 1935, she was appointed to teach worker education classes at the Harlem YWCA and Utopia Neighborhood House.

Though known for her radical ideals, Pinkney differed from many of her peers as she also embraced labor interracialism. For example, her involvement with YWCA, a widely segregated organization. Though Pinkney existed in this segregated space, she took full advantage of her leadership roles and used her organizing abilities to build up the black community and union members to gain power and respect and from White women leaders.
