= John Nevin Sayre =

American activist

The Reverend John Nevin Sayre
- Born: February 4, 1884; Bethlehem, Pennsylvania, US
- Died: September 13, 1977 (aged 93); South Nyack, New York, US
- Education: Princeton University; Union Theological Seminary
- Spouses: Helen Augusta Bangs (m. 1910; died 1912); Kathleen Whitaker (m. 1922)
- Relatives: Francis Bowes Sayre Sr. (brother)
- Religion: Christianity (Anglican)
- Church: Episcopal Church (United States)
- Ordained: 1911 (deacon); 1912 (priest)

John Nevin Sayre (February 4, 1884 – September 13, 1977) was an American Episcopal priest, peace activist, and author. He was an active member of the Fellowship of Reconciliation (FOR) and helped found the Episcopal Pacifist Fellowship (now the Episcopal Peace Fellowship). The US State Department official Francis Bowes Sayre Sr. was his brother.

== Reputation ==
Sayre promoted peace and supported conscientious objectors throughout the world through magazines he edited (The World Tomorrow and Fellowship), books that he wrote, and various peace organizations he belonged to or founded.

== Academics ==
Sayre taught nonviolent techniques at the Brookwood Labor College.

== Hiss Case ==
Whittaker Chambers's wife Esther Shemitz and her friend Grace Lumpkin worked for Sayre on the staff of The World Tomorrow magazine during the 1920s.

Later, Sayre's brother Francis Bowes Sayre Sr. had Alger Hiss reporting to him at the State Department, then declined to testify on Hiss's behalf.
