= Packard (surname) =

Packard is a surname of English origin. Notable people with the surname include:

- Alicyn Packard, voice actress
- Alpheus S. Packard (1798–1884), American educator
- Alpheus Spring Packard (1839–1905), American entomologist and palaeontologist
- Becky Wai-Ling Packard, professor of Psychology and Education
- Damon Packard (born 1967), American film director
- David Packard (1912–1996), co-founder of Hewlett-Packard
- Dennis Packard (born 1982), Canadian ice hockey player
- Edward Packard (writer) (born 1931), American author
- Edward Packard (businessman, born 1819) (1819–1899), British fertilizer manufacturer
- Edward Packard (businessman, born 1843) (1843–1932), British fertilizer manufacturer
- Elizabeth Packard (1816–1897), American women's rights and mental health activist
- Emmy Lou Packard (1914–1998), American visual artist
- Frank L. Packard (1877–1942), Canadian novelist
- Harrison Daniel Packard (1838–1874), South Australian surveyor
- James Ward Packard (1863–1928), automobile designer and manufacturer, co-founder of Packard Motor Company
- John Harrison Packard (1847–1929), South Australian surveyor
- Julie Packard, American conservationist and philanthropist
- Keith Packard, American software developer
- Kelly Packard (born 1975), American actress
- Marlboro Packard (1828–1904), American master shipbuilder
- Norman Packard (born 1954), American physicist and chaos theorist
- Ron Packard (born 1931), American politician from California
- Sherman Packard (born 1949), American politician from New Hampshire
- Vance Packard (1914–1996), American journalist, social critic, and author
- Walter Packard (1884–1966), National Director of the U.S. Rural Resettlement Administration
- William Alfred Packard (1830–1909), American classical scholar
- William Doud Packard (1861–1923), American co-founder of Packard Motor Company
- William Guthrie Packard (1889–1987), American businessman
- William Packard (author) (1933–2002), American poet and editor

Packard is also the name of the following fictional characters:

- Andrew Packard, fictional character on the American television show Twin Peaks
- Norris Packard, fictional character in MS Gundam

== See also ==
- Packard (disambiguation)
- Pickard, a surname
