= Richard V. Correll =

Richard Van Dyke Correll
- Born: October 22, 1904; Springfield, Missouri, U.S.
- Died: June 15, 1990 (aged 85); Oakland, California, U.S.
- Known for: Printmaking

Richard Van Dyke Correll (October 22, 1904 – June 15, 1990) was an American artist, primarily known as a printmaker. He began his professional career in Seattle in the Federal Art Project, then spent most of his working life in New York City and the San Francisco Bay Area. He earned a living as a commercial artist in the book publishing and advertising fields while producing a large body of fine art in his own time. His work was characterized by strong, rhythmic design, usually in stark black and white, and themes ranging from landscapes and agricultural scenes, harbors and ships, nature and music to those which reflected his lifelong concern with political, social and environmental issues.

== Early life ==
Born in 1904, in Missouri, Richard V. Correll spent most of his life in California, Oregon, and Washington. He showed artistic talent early and was largely self-taught. His only formal training was a few classes he took at the (then) Chouinard Art Institute when his family lived in Los Angeles in the early 1920s.

== Seattle and the Works Project Administration ==
By the late 1930s Correll was selected to participate in the Federal Art Project of the Works Project Administration in Seattle. While working alongside such artists as Morris Graves, Mark Tobey, Faye Chong, Julius Twohy and Hannes Bok, Correll's work matured and his style crystallized. For many artists who were used to working alone this association with other artists from diverse backgrounds was an enriching education.

On the Federal Art Project Correll specialized in printmaking, primarily wood and linoleum block prints, but produced etchings, lithographs, drawings, gouache paintings and two murals for a high school in Arlington, Washington. He is particularly known for a suite of prints and one mural depicting the legendary American folk hero, Paul Bunyan. He also contributed to the Index of American Design.

During the Seattle years, Correll was a founding member of the Washington Artists' Union. He married in 1938. He had several solo shows and exhibited widely in national juried group shows (Print Club of Philadelphia, the California Etcher's Society, and the San Francisco Museum of Modern Art's Print Annual). In 1939 his work was exhibited at the New York World's Fair. Many of Correll's works from the WPA period are today in the collections of museums, universities, and public buildings, and continue to be shown and circulated.

=== Gallery ===
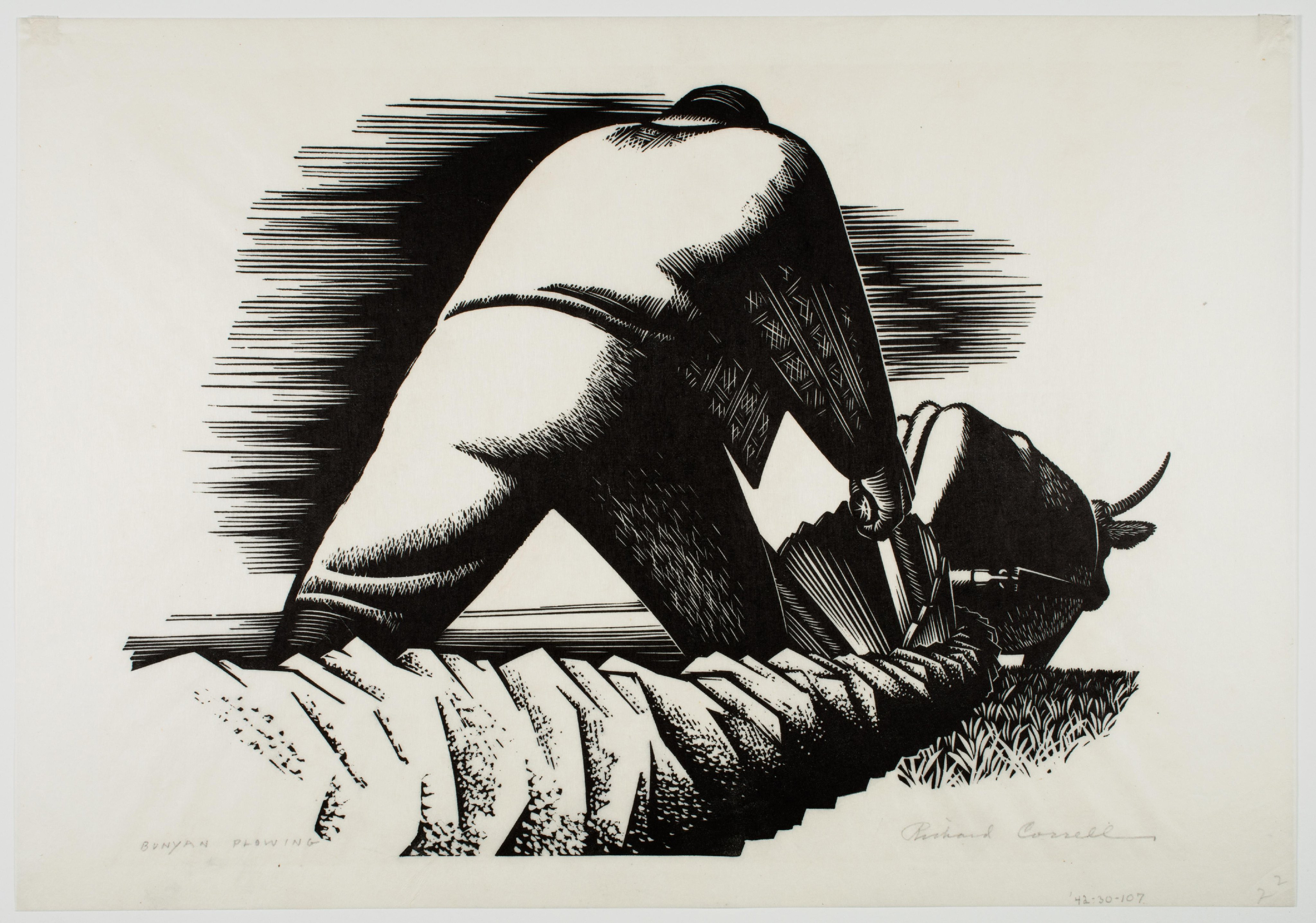
Paul Bunyan Digging Puget Sound, 1939

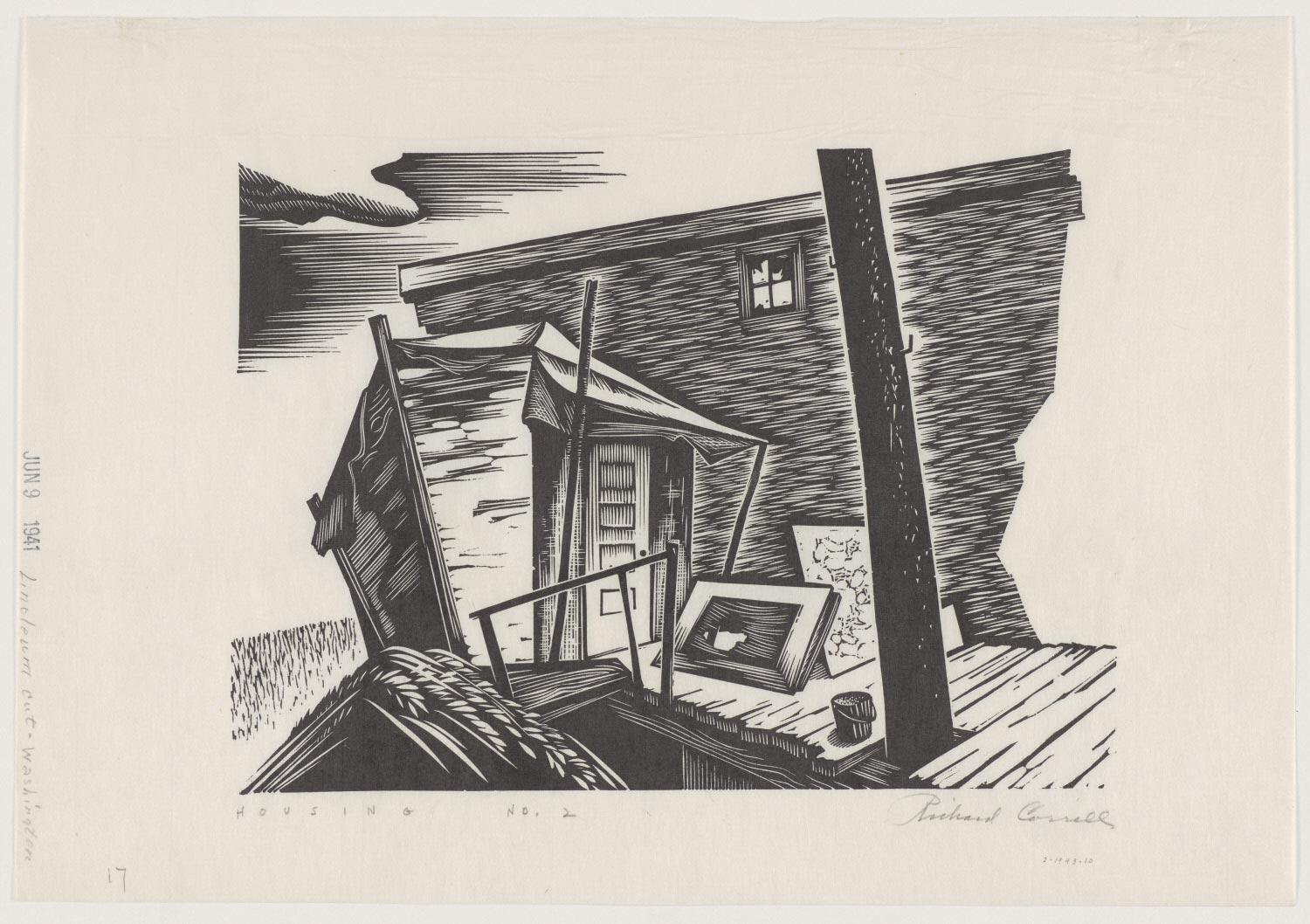
Dwellings of the Jobless, 1939

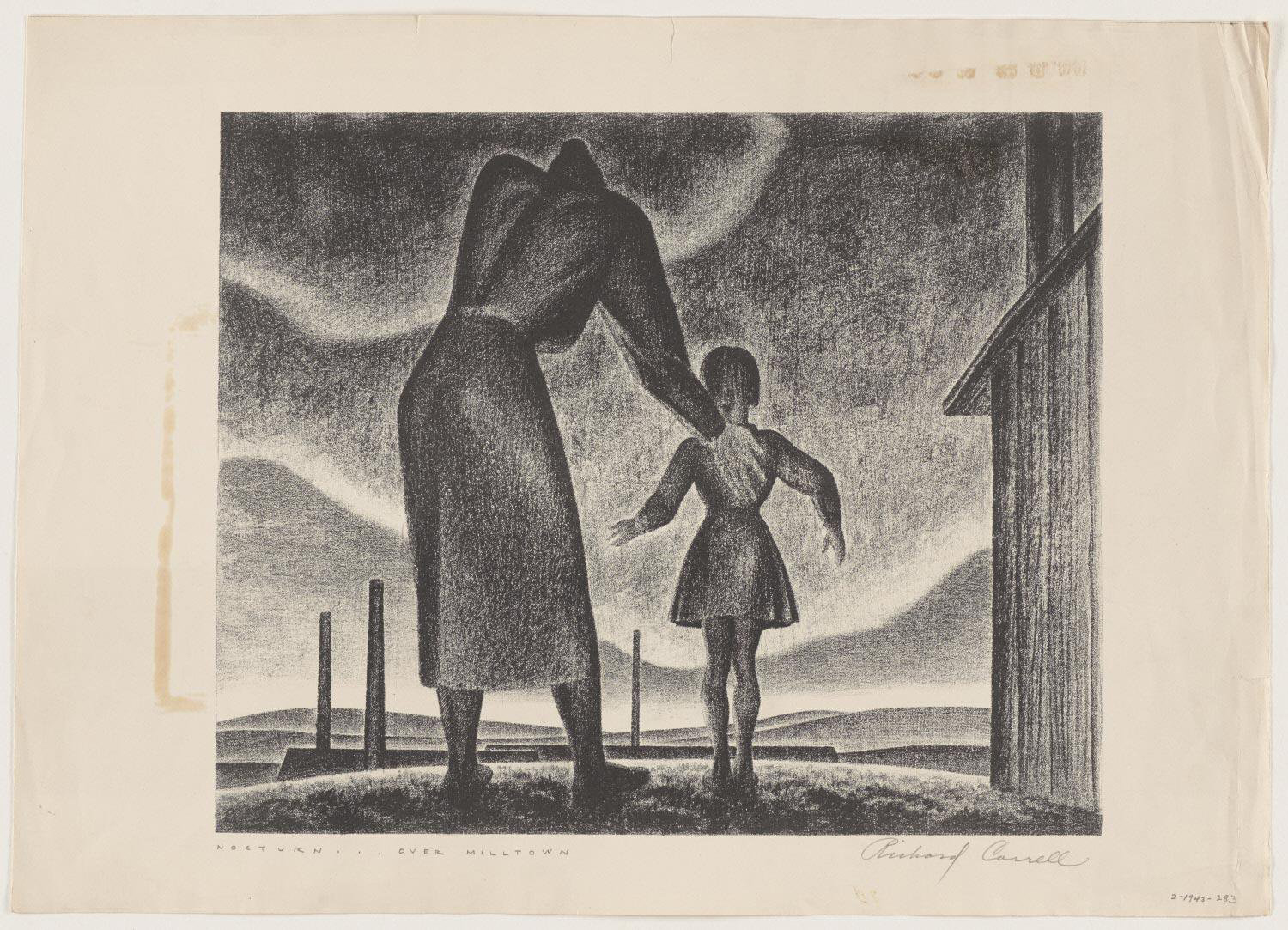
Nocturne...Over Milltown, c. 1939

== New York City ==
In 1941, after the WPA ended, the Corrells moved to New York City. As America entered World War II, Correll, at 36, too old for the draft, joined the Civilian Defense Corps as an air raid warden. He also produced artwork for Civil Defense and dozens of flyers, banners, signs, and posters for various causes. He earned a living on Madison Avenue as a free-lance artist in book publishing and advertising doing illustration, lettering, calligraphy and layout. "New York was an especially exciting place for an artist during these (postwar) years," he stated, "Murals by the Mexican artists could be seen in the New School for Social Research as well as in the Museum of Modern Art. Refugees from fascist persecution were bringing over the latest European art theories."

Correll was a founding member of the Artists League of America (ALA), an organization of artists and sculptors "devoted to social, cultural, and economic interest of artists." He served as Publication Chair of the ALA News from 1943 on, and by 1946 was Editor. Membership in those years included Rockwell Kent, Lynd Ward, Jacob Lawrence and Moses Soyer. He exhibited regularly with ALA, and his linocut, Air Raid Wardens was included in the "Artists for Victory" traveling exhibition at the Metropolitan Museum of Art and 26 other venues in the USA and Canada.

== San Francisco Bay Area ==
In 1952, the Corrells and daughter moved to San Francisco. Correll found steady work in a good commercial art studio and soon joined the newly-formed Graphic Arts Workshop (GAW) of San Francisco, a group of artist-activists who shared studio and exhibition space and contributed pro bono artwork to peace and social justice causes. Through his lifelong membership in the Workshop he met and worked with many other noted San Francisco artists and muralists such as Emmy Lou Packard, Victor Arnautoff, William Wolff, Irving Fromer, Louise Gilbert, Pele de Lappe and Stanley Koppel. In 1954 he visited México and saw in person the great works of Diego Rivera, José Clemente Orozco, and David Alfaro Siqueiros, and visited the Taller de Gráfica Popular that had so influenced him and his generation of socially engaged artists.

Correll retired in 1969, and in 1972 he and his wife moved to Oakland, California. He continued printmaking, exhibiting and pro bono community work until his death in 1990.

== Style and influence ==
Although Correll falls loosely into the Social Realist school, his art is not defined or confined by any labels. When Correll saw the "modernists" moving increasingly toward abstraction, he declared, "What interested me more than anything else was technique, how to do things, rather than art theory, because I always felt that I had my own ideas of what I wanted to do. In art I am chiefly attracted by the synthesis of realism and design; that is, a humanitarian realism and an abstract-dramatic design – each one to augment the other – an old combination of limitless possibilities." Correll stated that, above all, he was a humanist. His themes often reflected his social conscience and he was attracted by heroic acts committed by everyday people in the struggle to achieve dignity, freedom, and human rights.

Although never formally a teacher, Correll's command of technique and compositions blended with humanistic subject matter influenced many of the younger generation of West Coast printmakers and graphic artists.

His art is in the collection of the Library of Congress, and the National Gallery of Art, Washington, DC, The Philadelphia Museum of Art, the Art Institute of Chicago, and many others. His entire archives is in the Labor Archives of Washington, University of Washington Libraries Special Collections.

== Bibliography ==
- Correll, Richard V., DeWitt Cheng, Lincoln Cushing, and Leslie Correll. 2005. Richard V. Correll: prints and drawings. Oakland, Calif: Correll Studios.
- Grijalva, Brian. "Richard Correll and the Woodcut Graphics of the Voice of Action," Communism in Washington State Historyand Memory Project Retrieved October 19, 2016
- M. Lee Stone Fine Prints. "Richard V. Correll (1904-1990)," M. Lee Stone Fine Prints.com. Retrieved October 19, 2016
- Mahoney, Eleanor. "The Federal Art Project in Washington State," The Great Depression in Washington State Project. Retrieved October 19, 2016 from The Great Depression in Washington State Project.
