= Graphic Arts Workshop =

Address
- 2565 3rd Street, #305; San Francisco, California 94107; United States

Information
- School type: Art School
- Founded: 1952
- Sister school: California Labor School
- Website: http://graphicartsworkshop.org/

The Graphic Arts Workshop (GAW) of San Francisco, a cooperative print studio, is located in the Dogpatch neighborhood. The studio has approximately 40 members working in fine art printmaking techniques such as lithography, intaglio, serigraphs, and relief printing. GAW offers affordable printmaking studio access and printmaking classes.

== History ==
GAW was founded in 1952 by several artists from the California Labor School. The founding members of GAW include: Pele De Lappe, Victor Arnautoff, Emmy Lou Packard, Byron Randall, Stanley Koppel, Louise Gilbert, Ed Hanson, Virginia Bogue, Claus Sievert, Frank Rowe, Irving Fromer, and Charles Keller. Many of the early printmakers at GAW were interested in left-wing leaning politics, Communism, social movements, and the labor movement and as a result they produced images of political, social, labor, and ethnic themes. When the California Labor School closed in 1957, GAW inherited a lot of printmaking tools and supplies.
