= Byron Randall =

American painter (1918–1999)

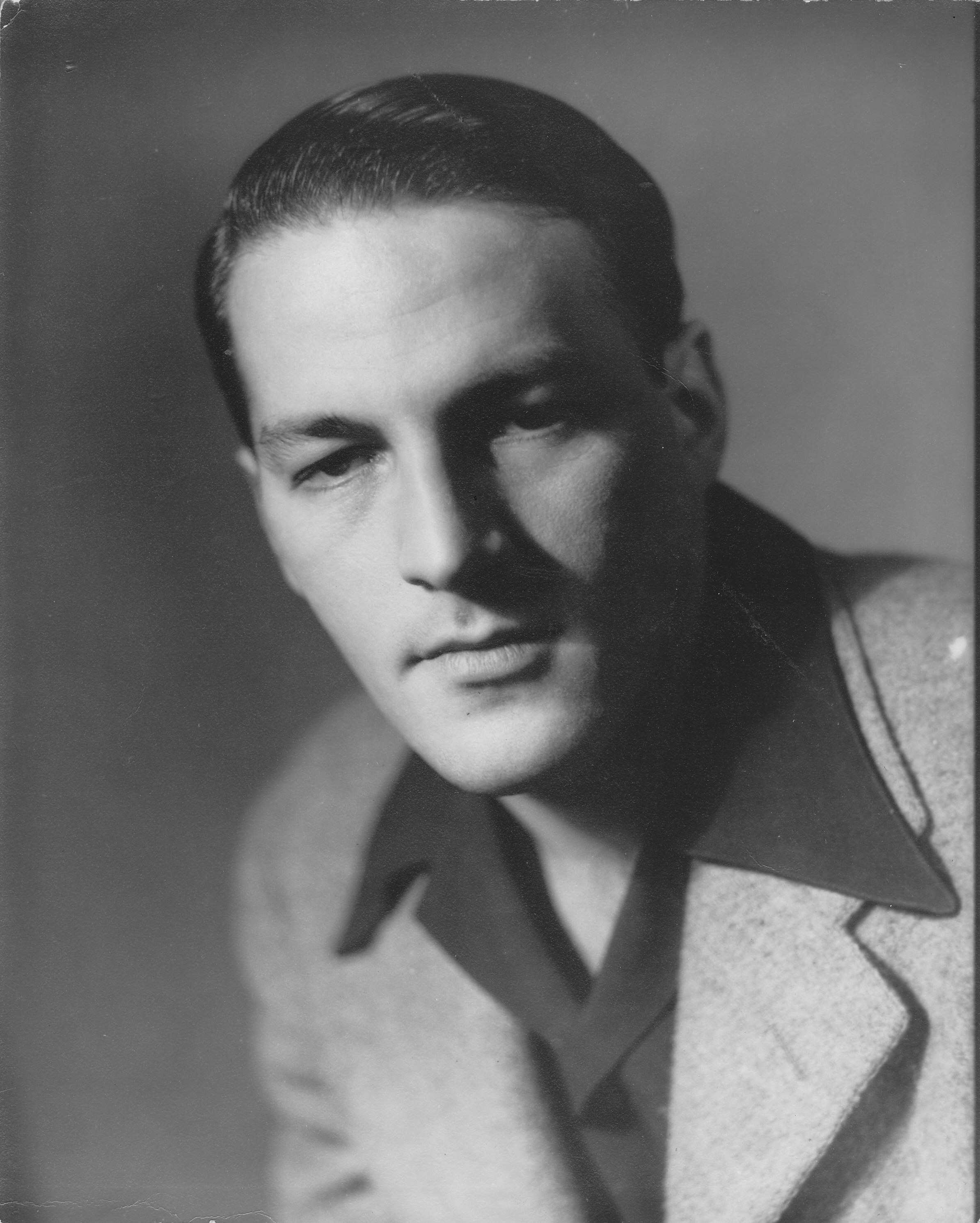
- Born: Byron Theodore Randall; October 23, 1918; Tacoma, Washington, U.S.
- Died: August 11, 1999 (aged 80); San Francisco, California, U.S.
- Education: Federal Art Project
- Known for: Painting, printmaking
- Movement: Social realism, expressionism
- Spouse(s): Helen Nelson (1940–1956), Emmy Lou Packard (1959–1972), Eve Wieland (1981–1986)
- Partner: Pele de Lappe (1990–1999)

Byron Randall (October 23, 1918 – August 11, 1999) was an expressionist artist and social activist. Recognized as both a painter and a printmaker, he produced landscapes, still lifes, portraiture, satire, and nudes. Labor, war, and Mexico are among his most prominent themes. Critics identify glowing and unusual color, dramatic lines, intense energy, and emotional range as the hallmarks of his style. As an activist, Randall was known for peace and environmental work, founding and chairing arts organizations, and promoting international cultural understanding.

== Early Years: Oregon, Mexico, and the American East Coast ==
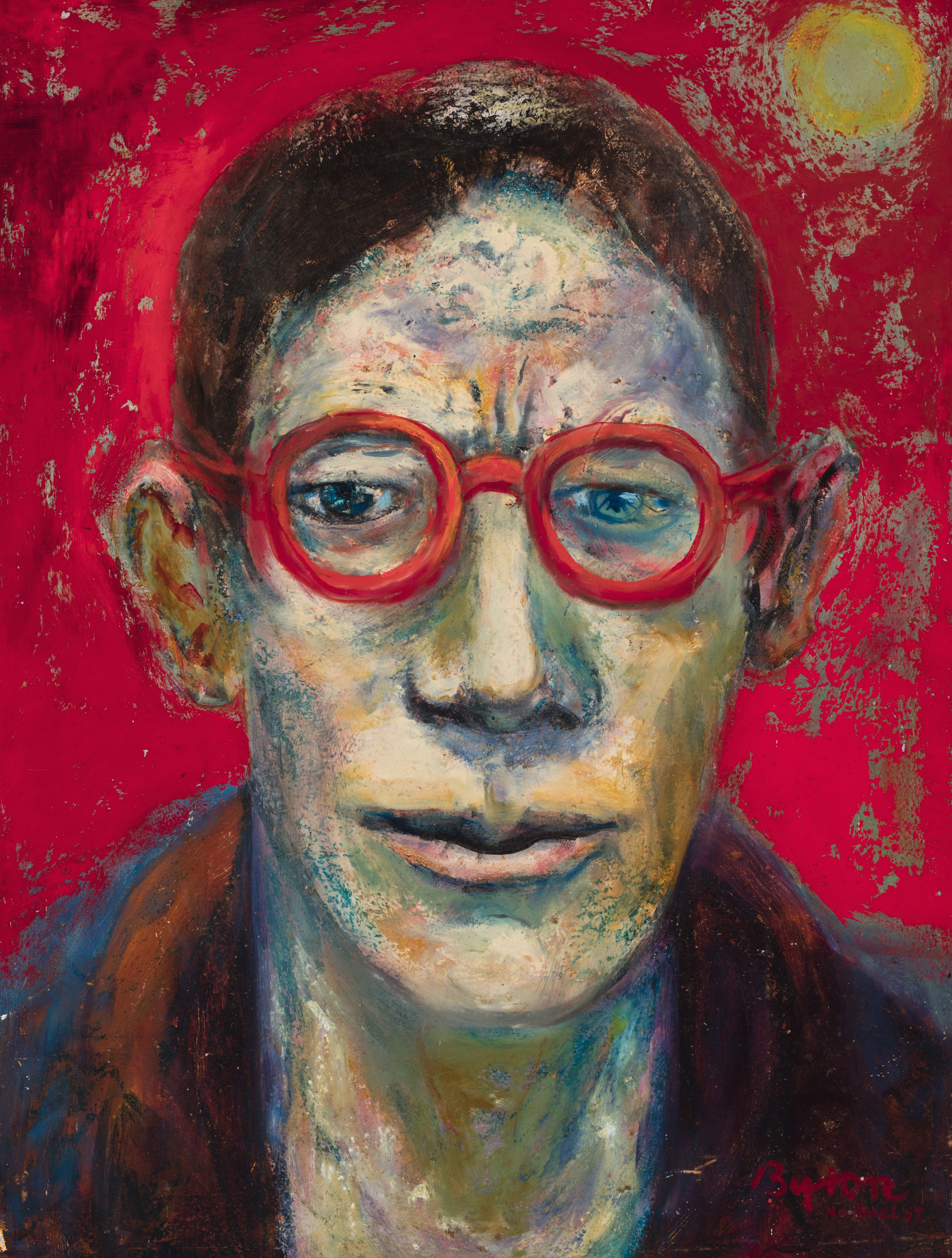
Byron Randall, Self Portrait, 1957 (oil)

Randall was born in Tacoma, Washington and raised in Salem, Oregon. His family's economic hardship during the Great Depression influenced him to become a socially-critical artist. He studied under Louis Bunce at Salem's Federal Art Center (a Community Art Program sponsored by the Federal Art Project), and was mentored by the Center's Director, Charles Val Clear. Randall identified both the Oregon landscape and the New Deal's Works Progress Administration as formative to his creative development.

In 1939, Salem's Art Center hosted the 20-year-old's first one-man show of watercolors. Later that year Randall went to Washington, D.C. where he showed his watercolors to Donald Whyte, founder of the Whyte Gallery, and his professional career began. Whyte put him on a long-term stipend, bought over 30 watercolors, and quickly resold the majority. Whyte's Gallery hosted Randall's one-man show, "Present Tense", in October 1939. Newsweek magazine published a feature on Randall and his exhibit. National media declared him "Art Find of the Season" and carried images of his show's Mexican landscapes, New York cityscapes, and portraits. Duncan Phillips, founder of The Phillips Collection, added Randall's watercolor "Nocturne" to his collection. New York's Museum of Modern Art included his work in the "Unknown American Painters" show, while Whyte arranged a one-man show that toured the West Coast. His East Coast success was closely tracked in his home state, which saw in it a national recognition of Oregon's beauty and cultural significance.

In 1940, Randall married Helen Nelson, a Canadian sculptor who had joined the Salem Federal Art Center in 1938 and specialized in instructing blind children. The couple moved to Mexico City, where Byron became involved with the Taller de Grafica Popular and befriended one of its founders, the muralist and printmaker Pablo O'Higgins. The Randalls returned to the US in 1941 with a large collection of Mexican art, which they exhibited to the Oregon public. Randall saw strong government support as a major factor in Mexican cultural excellence, and advocated that the USA follow its example. He now taught at the Salem Federal Art Center. There he held a major retrospective of 75 works, which was extended by popular demand. Among the pieces that quickly sold was a socially-conscious painting about the Spanish Civil War. As a printmaker, Randall made a linocut series about the effects of World War II on Salem civilian life.

== Middle Years: California's Bay Area and Canada ==
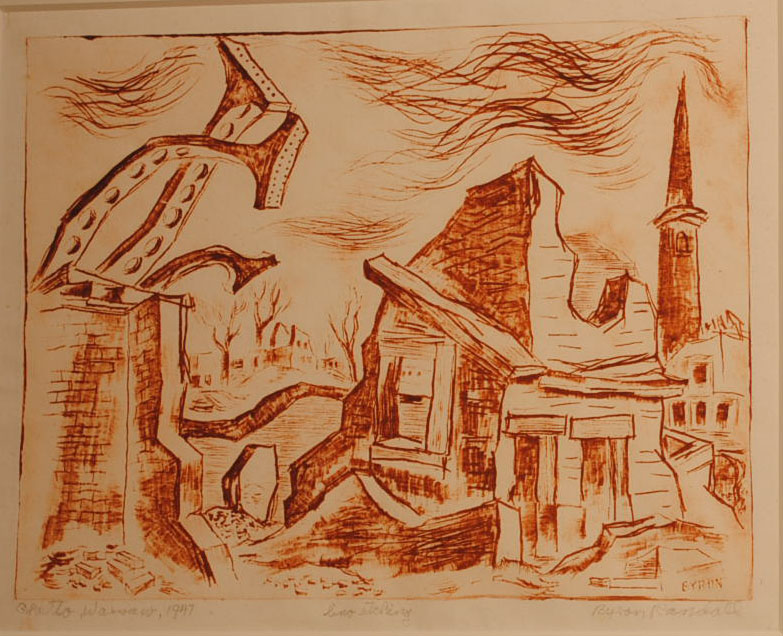
Ghetto Warsaw 1947

The Randalls moved to California in 1942, from where Byron shipped out to the South Pacific, as a Merchant Marine, with his artist friend Robert P. McChesney. Both artists painted prolifically in conditions that were frequently life-threatening. Randall's resulting South Pacific paintings were exhibited in California in the 1940s. In San Francisco, he became part of a North Beach artistic community associated with Henri Lenoir, proprietor of the Iron Pot, 12 Adler Place, and Vesuvio Cafe. These establishments operated simultaneously as art galleries and restaurants. Randall participated in one-man and group shows at Lenoir's venues. From these, San Francisco Museum of Art (later named San Francisco Museum of Modern Art) selected a Randall work for its permanent collection.

Randall was also part of an artistic community that taught and exhibited at the California Labor School. In 1948, to commemorate the centenary of the Communist Manifesto, it published the booklet, The Communist Manifesto in Pictures, with illustrations by Randall, Giacomo Patri, Robert McChesney, Hassel Smith, Louise Gilbert, Lou Jackson, and Bits Hayden. One of these, Randall's "Diabolical Machine", was reproduced in the leftwing journal Mainstream.

Shortly after World War II ended, Randall worked as an art correspondent for a Canadian news agency, which sent him to Poland and Yugoslavia. His East European scenes of cities, war ruins, and Jewish survivors were exhibited in Chicago and L.A. During this decade Randall's work was included in multiple annual San Francisco Art Association shows: three times as watercolorist, once as oil painter, and once as printmaker. His work was exhibited in major group shows at the San Francisco Museum of Art in 1949 and 1950. Randall's art was frequently shown in Los Angeles galleries, and was particularly popular at L.A.'s American Contemporary Gallery, where he held six one-man shows.

While living in the Bay Area, Randall was active in local arts organizing. Inspired by the example of the Taller de Grafica, he founded the San Francisco Artists' Guild and served as its president. The Guild established a gallery and exhibited work by many California Labor School artists. It hosted the first West Coast show of revolutionary graphic art by the Taller. Randall's activism also led him to serve as the co-chair of the San Francisco Committee for Municipal Art which successfully campaigned for city funds to sponsor and finance San Francisco's first open air art show.

Randall was involved in the US Communist movement, and, in 1953, following the advice of an attorney, the Randalls moved to Canada to escape McCarthyism. Randall painted scenes of urban and rural Canadian life, while there, and taught art at the Montreal Y.M.H.A. He travelled again to Mexico in 1954, where he was made an Associate Member of the Taller de Grafica Popular. There he produced a linocut series of Mexican working people. From it, "Maestros", "Hanging Clothes" and "Carbonero" were published in American and Russian journals. In Montreal, Randall's wife Helen was fatally struck by a car in 1956.

== Late Years: California's Mendocino and Tomales ==
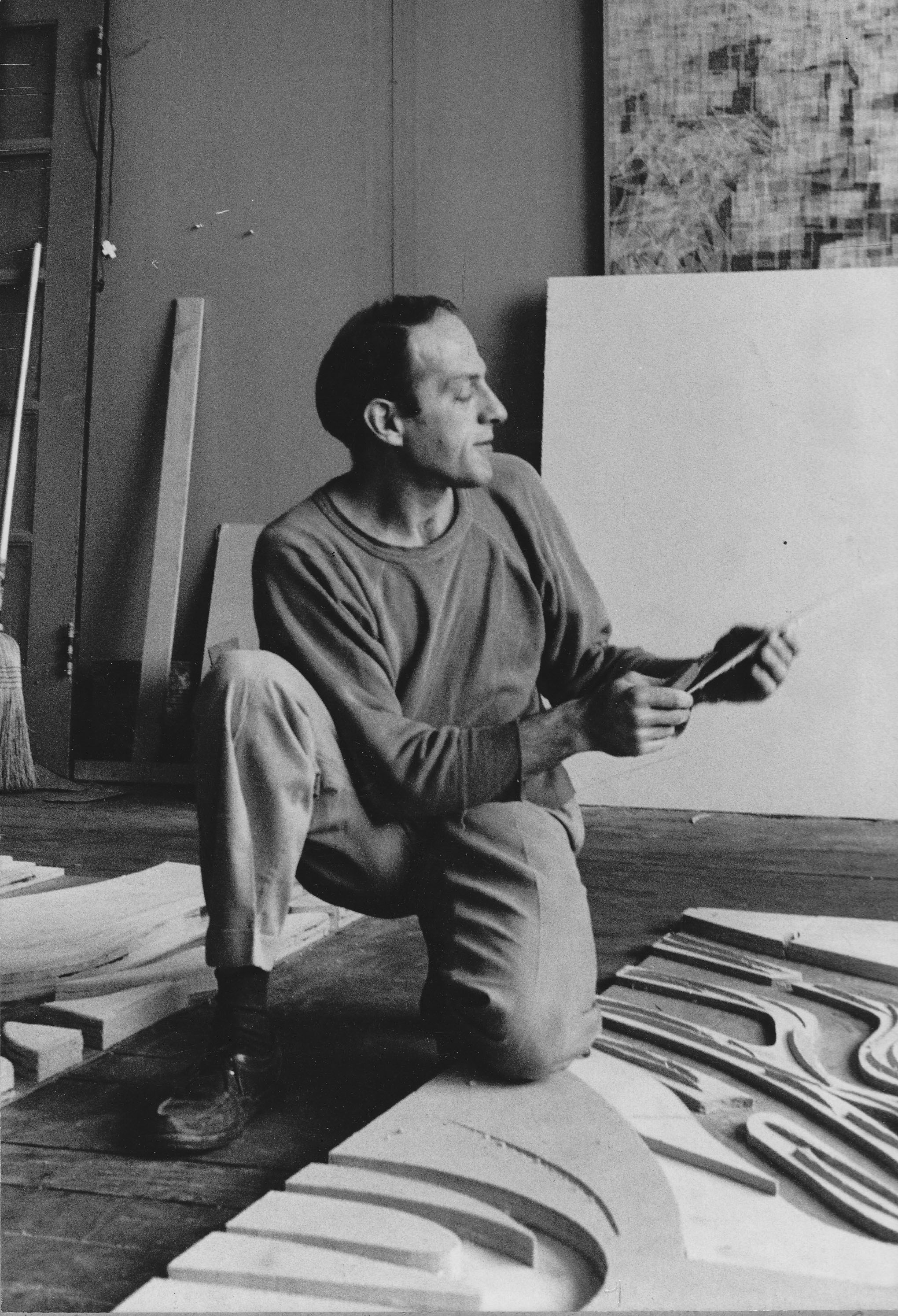
Randall at Berkeley, 1960s

Following his wife's death, Randall returned to California, where he developed the mixed media "Water Street, San Francisco" still life series. In 1959 he married the muralist, painter, and printmaker Emmy Lou Packard. They belonged to a creative vanguard of artists that moved from the Bay Area to the Northern California coastal town of Mendocino. They established the Randall Packard Art Gallery. Together they exhibited in galleries and public institutions across the West Coast. As muralists, they created a concrete bas relief frieze at the U.C. Berkeley Chavez Student Center. In 1964, Russia's Pushkin Museum acquired 48 of their block prints for its permanent collection, and hosted a televised exhibition devoted to their work. Packard and Randall reciprocated by hosting a Soviet Art exhibit in 1967, the first art exchange exhibit of Soviet art on the West Coast.

The couple were members of the Mendocino Citizen's Committee, whose purpose was to foster political debate. Involved in the anti-war movement, they were US delegates to the 1965 Eighth World Congress for Peace, National Independence, and General Disarmament, in Helsinki. Their gallery became the local headquarters for the Peace and Freedom Party. They were also environmental activists who successfully campaigned to turn the Mendocino Headlands into a state park. Their activism subjected them to death threats and property damage.

In Salem, Randall held a major one-man show in 1960, its two parts divided into his early and recent art. As before at this venue, the show was extended by popular demand. His Mendocino years were prolific. He developed the Doomsday series of oils, prompted by his understanding of contemporary life as a time "when unthinkably hideous destruction confronts most of us on earth". Exhibited in 1971, it was described as a "powerful statement" of a "sinister and senseless" condition; from the series the works "A Day at the Beach", "Thanksgiving", "And Then There Were None" were praised for their use of a "whirling madness of color" to depict "half-recognizable" bodies and objects exploding from a miasma. Randall continued his anti-war concerns through his work as a printmaker. In Mendocino, he also worked in still life and landscape genres. He collected saws, planes, jackscrews, and brace-and-bits, which he turned into "strong and colorful" oil paintings that the San Francisco Carpenter Union acquired for its Hall. Several Mendocino still life block prints were exhibited, and published, in Russia, including "Plum Branches", "Peeling Apples", and "Apple Tree and Crocus". In 1969, Randall created an exuberant series of Hawaii landscapes, inspired by the windward side of Oahu. Randall and Packard's marriage ended in the late 1960s and their divorce was finalized in 1972.

In 1970, Randall settled in Tomales, California, where he established a guest house and art gallery. His conversion of the lot's chicken coop into his studio and home was captured in a book. He amassed a large collection of manual potato mashers, which garnered national attention. Randall's international activism continued; in 1975, he, along with Emmy Lou Packard was among a group of socially concerned artists that exhibited in Tashkent, invited by the Uzbek Friendship Society. Locally, he joined the opposition to Christo and Jeanne-Claude's "Running Fence" art installation in Sonoma County. He was among a group of artists who participated in a major Marin County show addressing environmental and aesthetic crises, titled "Endangered Species, Cows and Artists". From the 1980s onward, Randall's paintings used a personal symbolism of Satan, skulls, nude females and Mickey Mouse that he would not explain. He also created a series of small linocuts of sensual nudes that was exhibited at this time. In 1981 Randall married Eve Wieland, who died several years later. From 1990 until his death, his partner was the artist Pele de Lappe. He continued to exhibit through the last decade of his 60-year career. Byron Randall died in 1999.

== Collections, Archives, and Legacy ==
Since his death, Byron Randall's art has been exhibited in numerous group shows, and his work has been the focus of a number of retrospectives and one-man exhibits. Parts of his archive are held in the Kelley House Museum, Mendocino, and at the University of Washington. Grinnell College Museum of Art holds Randall's personal collections of Soviet art and anti-war posters.

Over 50 museums now hold his work in their permanent collections. These include:

- National Gallery of Art
- Fine Arts Museums of San Francisco
- San Francisco Museum of Modern Art
- Ackland Art Museum
- Art, Design & Architecture Museum
- Berkeley Art Museum and Pacific Film Archive
- Center for the Study of Political Graphics
- Centro Cultural de la Raza Archives
- Davis Museum at Wellesley College
- Davison Art Center
- de Saisset Museum
- Fresno Art Museum
- Frost Art Museum
- Georgia Museum of Art
- Grinnell College Museum of Art
- Hallie Ford Museum of Art
- Henry Art Gallery
- Housatonic Museum of Art
- Hunter Museum of American Art
- Jordan Schnitzer Museum of Art
- Jundt Art Museum, Gonzaga University
- Krannert Art Museum
- Los Angeles Museum of the Holocaust
- Mariners' Museum
- Mary and Leigh Block Museum of Art
- Maryhill Museum of Art
- Middlebury College Museum of Art
- Mills College Art Museum
- Minneapolis Institute of Art
- Monterey Museum of Art
- Musée national des beaux-arts du Québec
- San Jose Museum of Art
- Smith College Museum of Art
- Triton Museum of Art
- University of Iowa Stanley Museum of Art
- University of Michigan Museum of Art
- Weatherspoon Art Museum

== Gallery ==
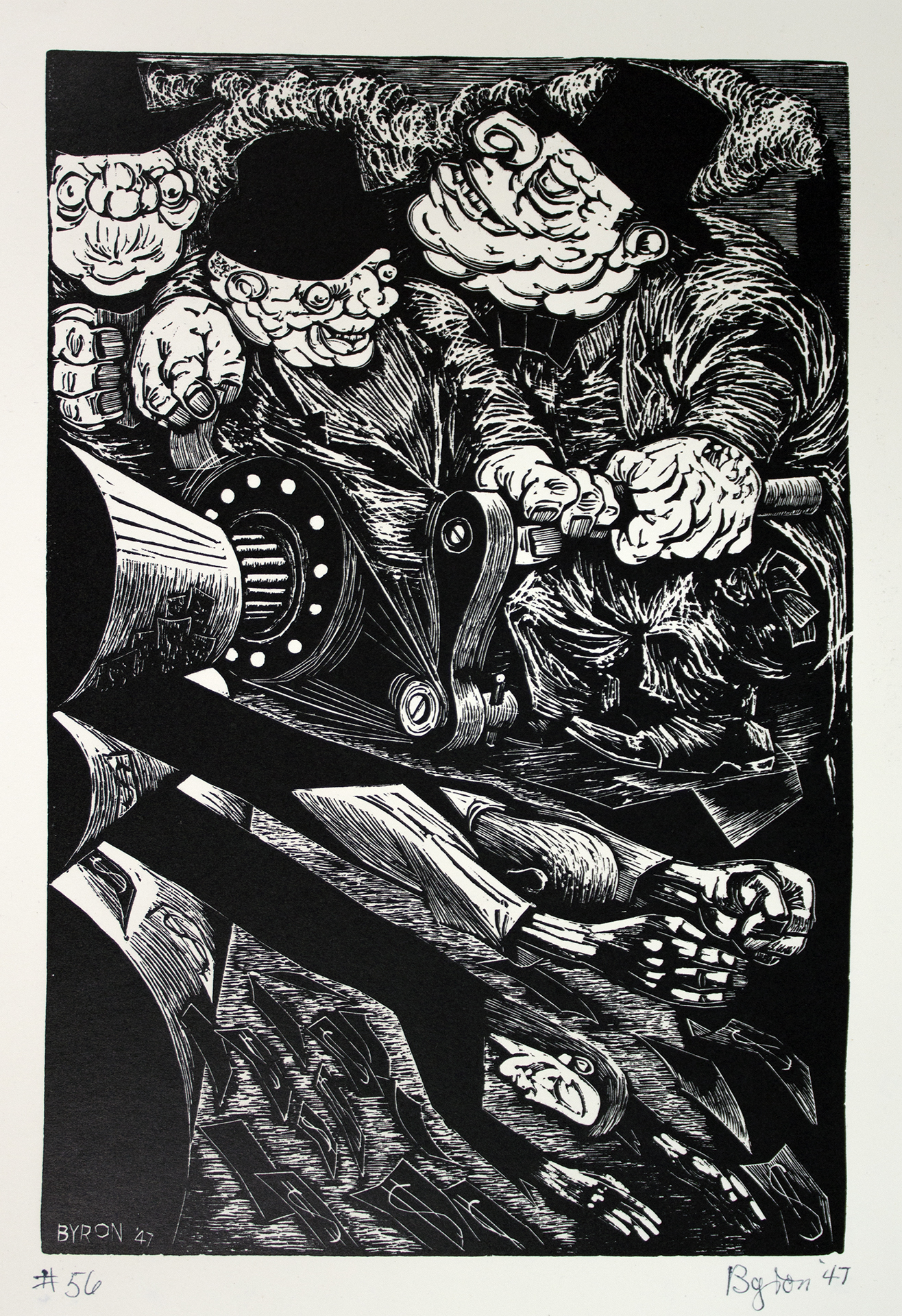
1947, Diabolical Machine, for 1948 Communist Manifesto in Pictures, Byron Randall

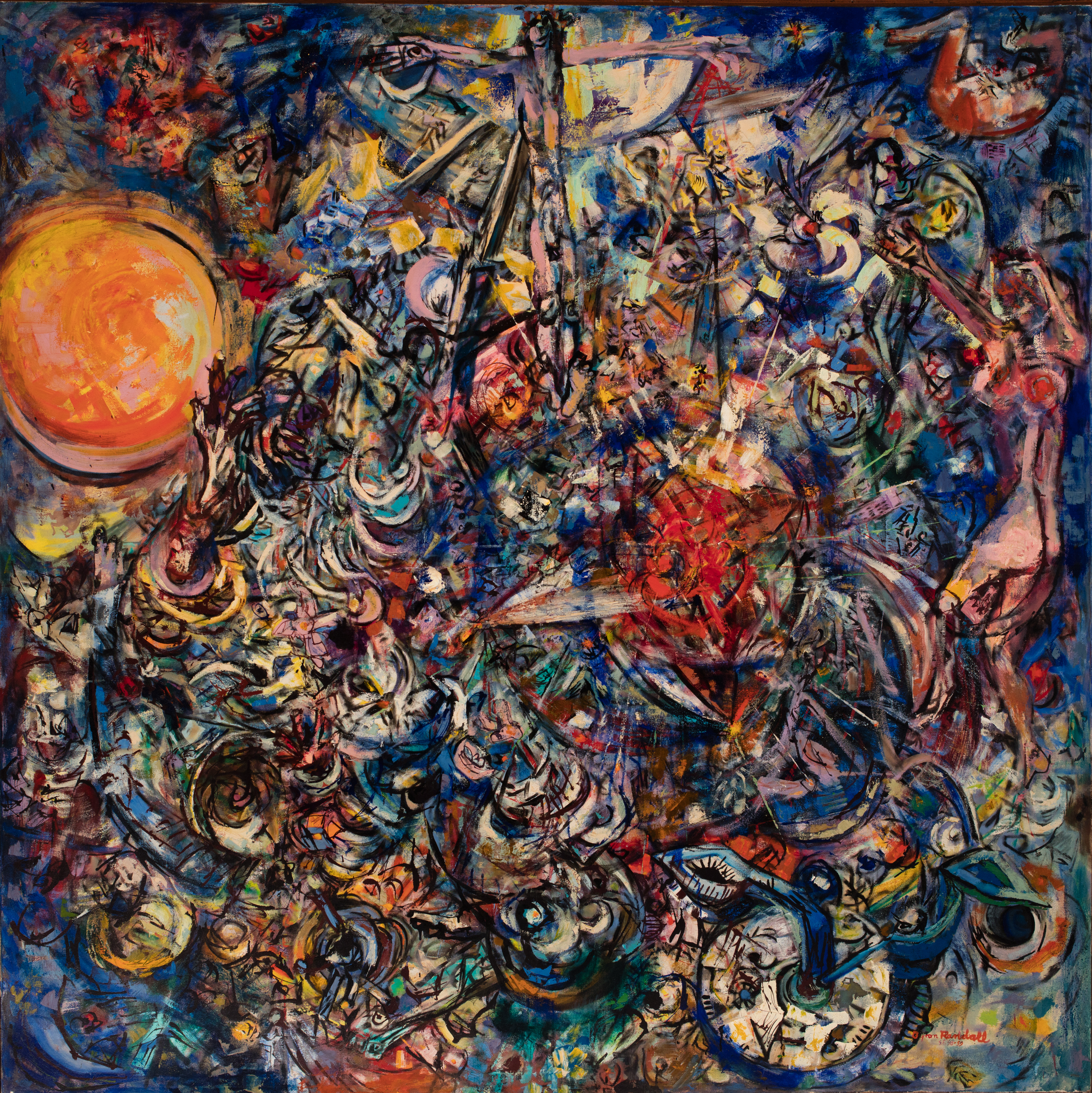
Then There Were None, 1959, Doomsday series (Byron Randall) (Jundt Museum)

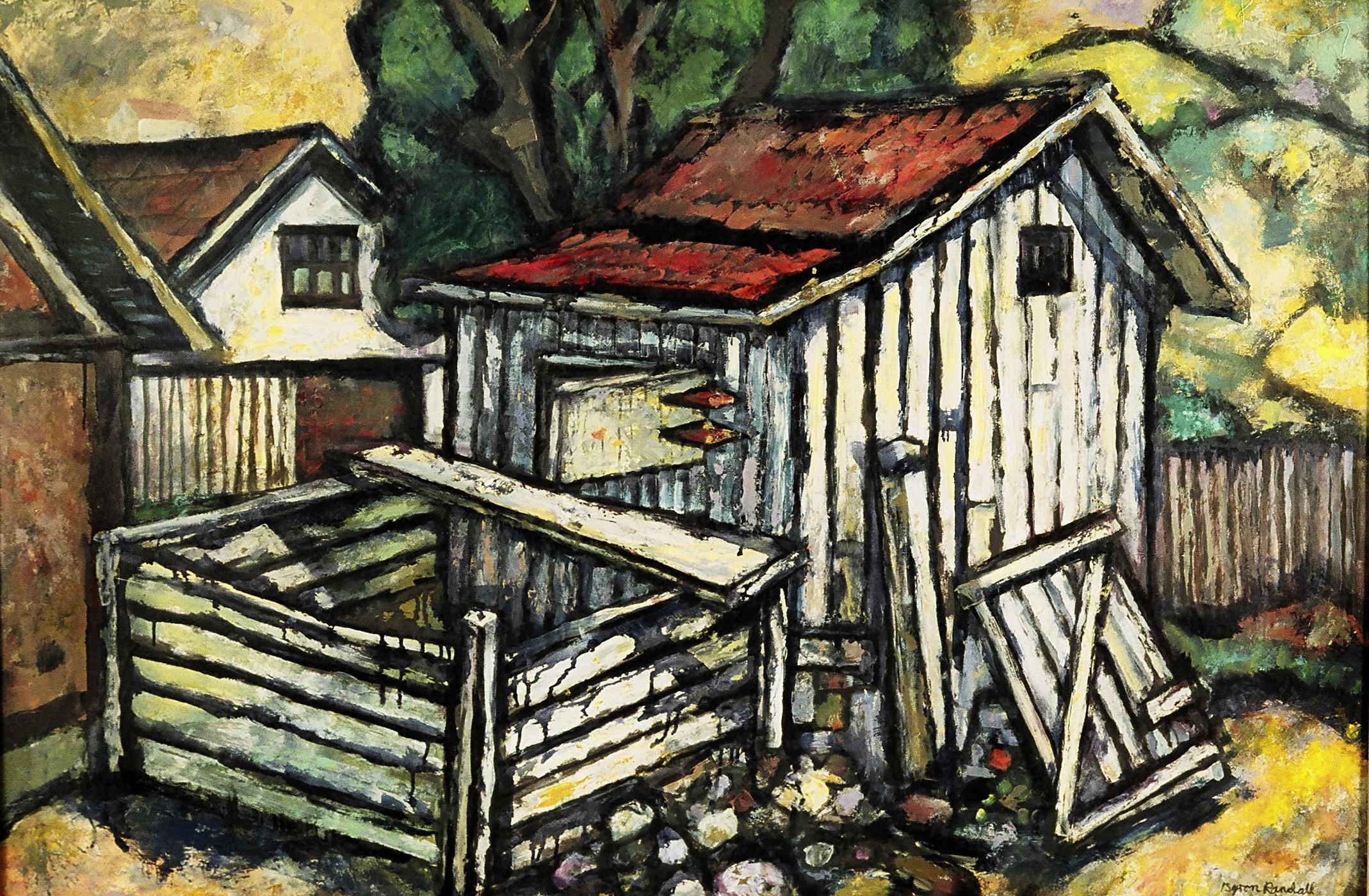
Philo 1964–89, Byron Randall (Private Collection)

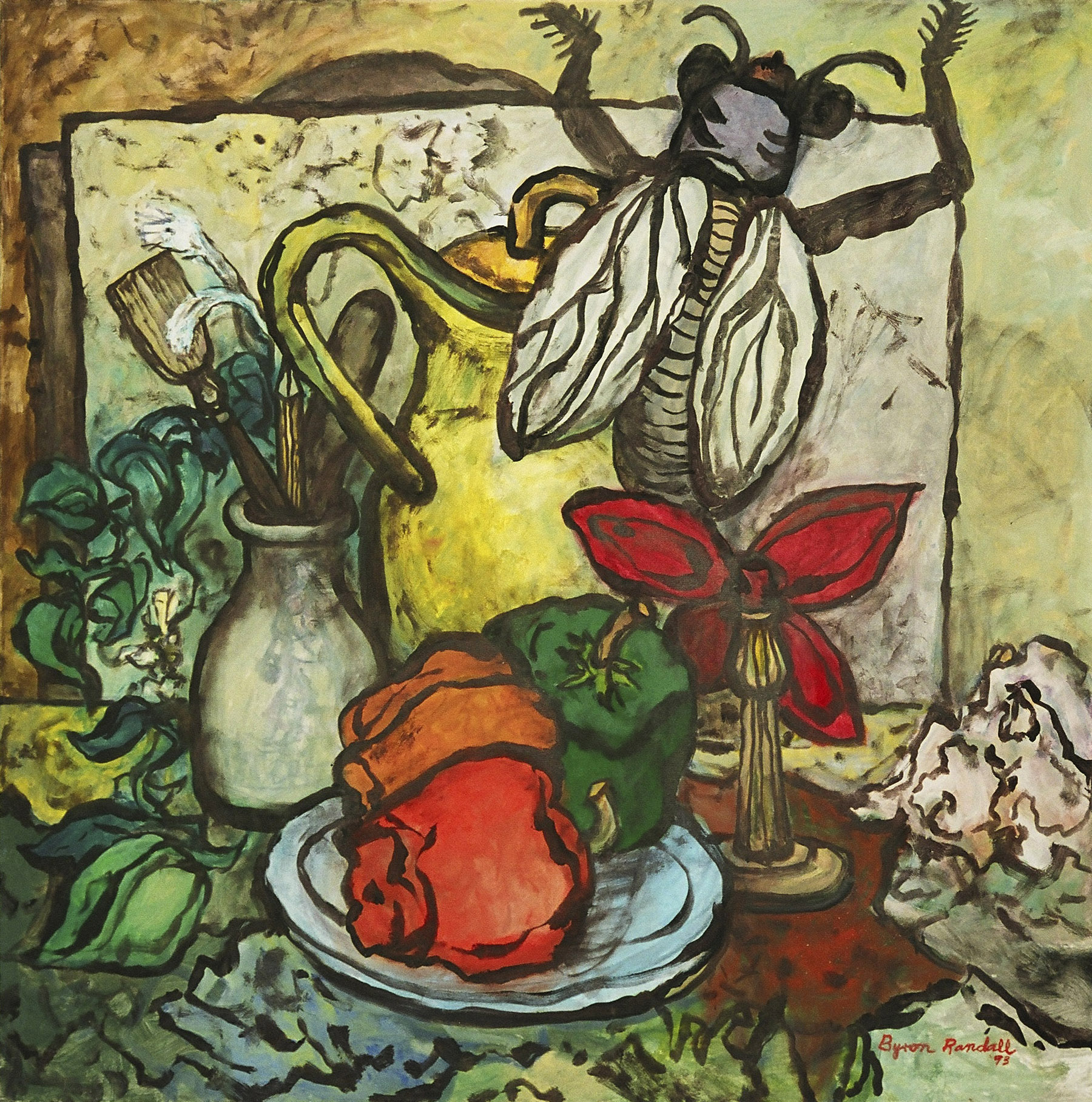
Peppers & Honeysuckle, 1993, Byron Randall (Long Beach Museum of Art)

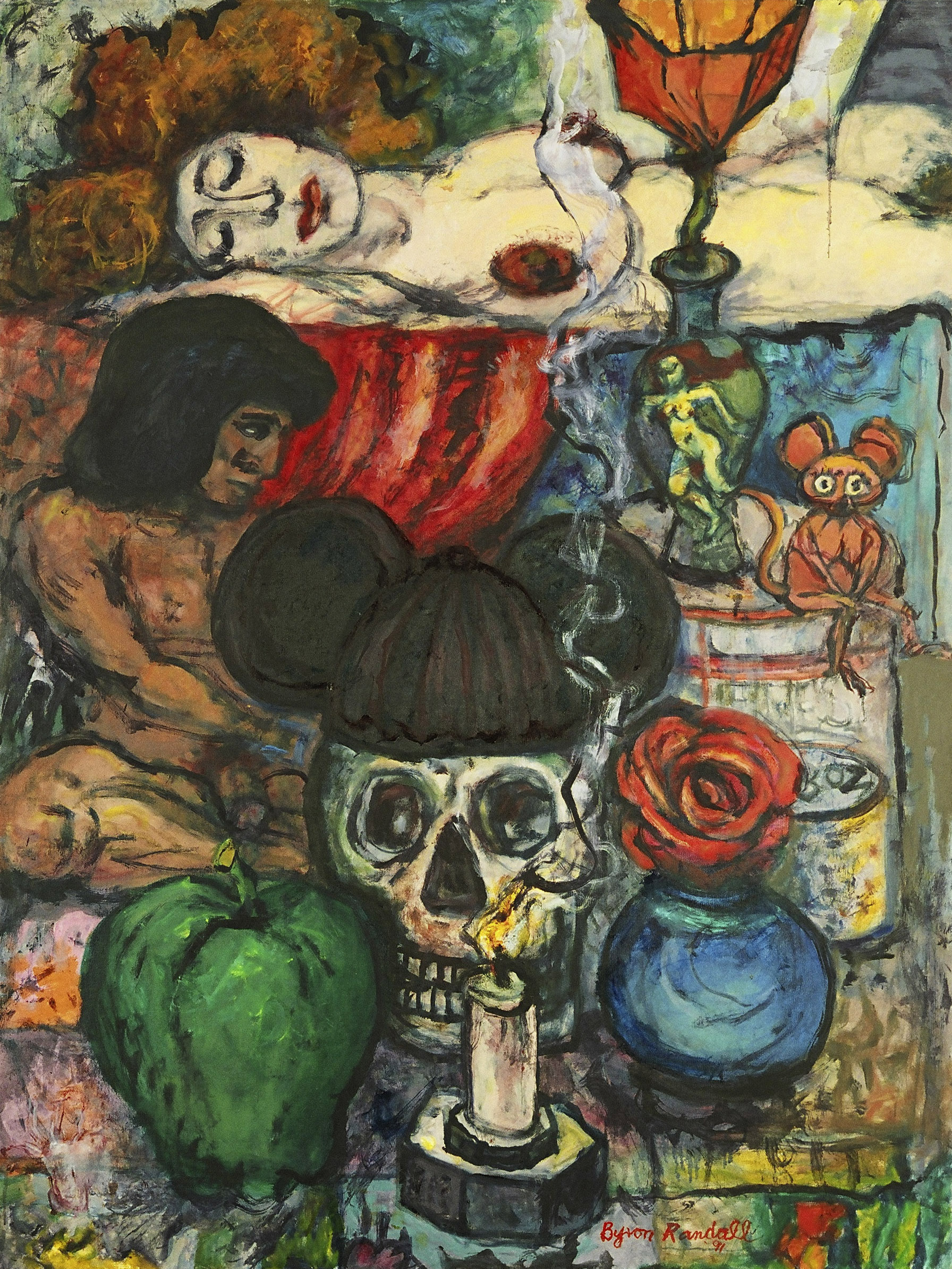
Mickey Skull, 1991, Byron Randall (Private Collection)

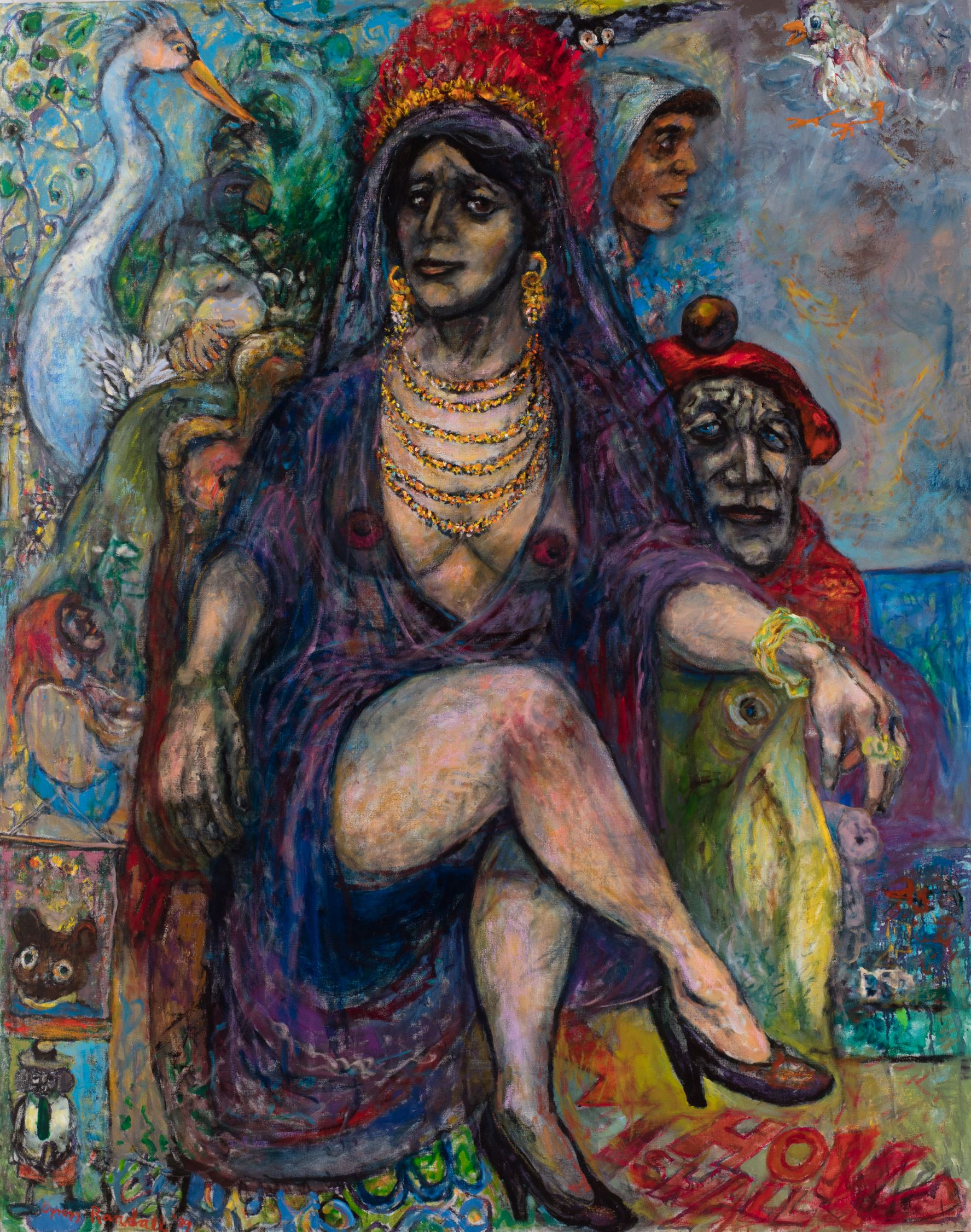
Lorraine Almeida, 1989, Byron Randall (Long Beach Museum of Art)

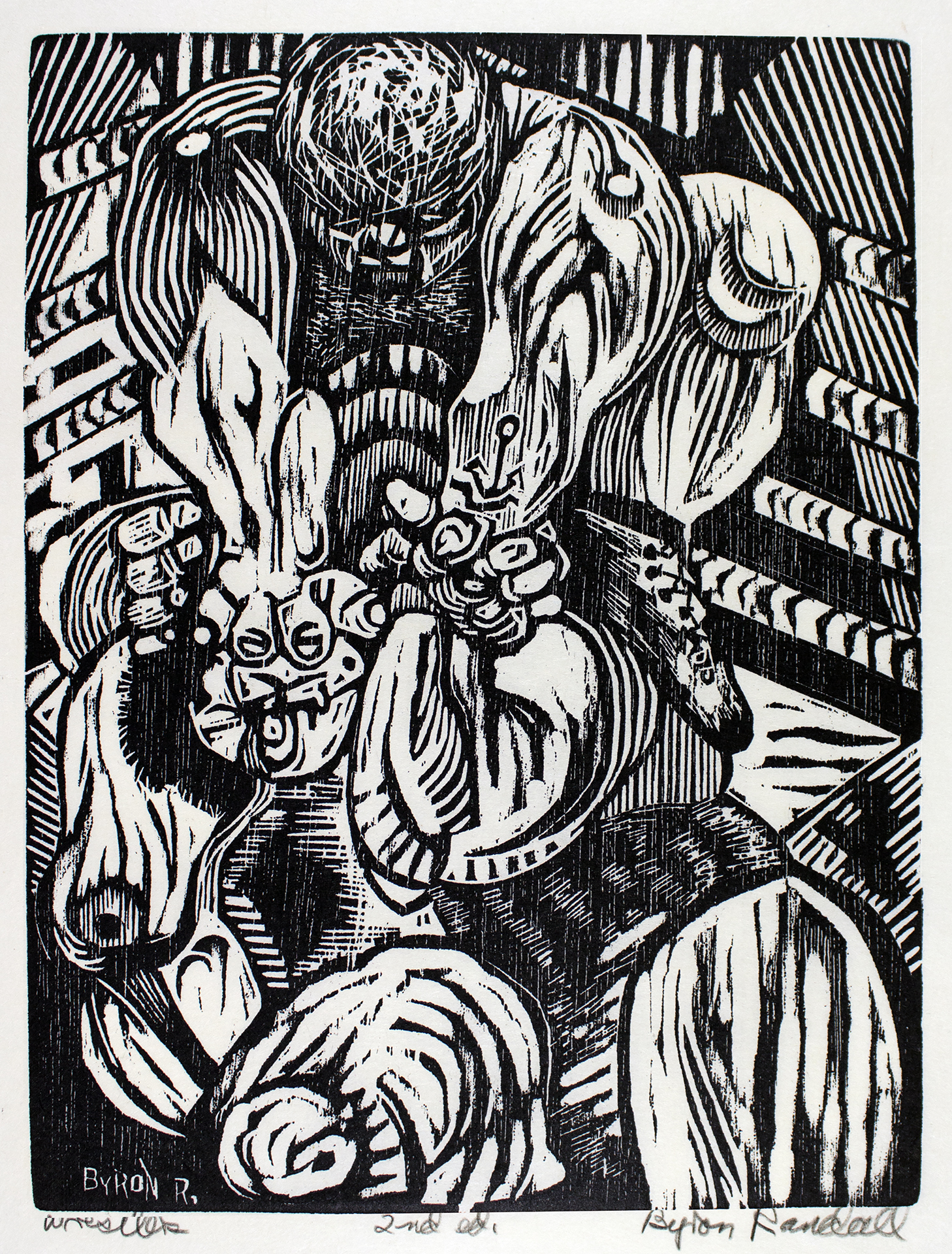
Byron Randall, Wrestlers, 1961
