= California Labor School =

Educational organization in San Francisco (1942–1957)

Location
- 216 Market Street & 240 Golden Gate Avenue; San Francisco, California

Information
- Other name: Tom Mooney Labor School
- Founded: 1942
- Closed: 1957 (aged 14–15)

The California Labor School (until 1945 named the Tom Mooney Labor School) was an educational organization in San Francisco from 1942 to 1957. Like the contemporary Jefferson School of Social Science and the New York Workers School, it represented the "transformed and upgraded" successors of the "workers schools" of the 1920s and 1930s.

== History ==
During World War II, as part of Browderism, Communist Party USA leader Earl Browder established new communist "schools of social sciences" in major urban areas. On the East Coast, these schools included names of American patriots: the Sam Adams School (Boston), Tom Paine School of Social Sciences (Philadelphia), George Washington Carver School (Harlem, New York), Abraham Lincoln School (Chicago), and Jefferson School of Social Sciences (New York). West Coast schools used geographic names: the Pacific Northwest Labor School and the California Labor School.

=== Founding ===
The CLS was founded in August 1942, in premises above a car showroom at 678 Turk Street in San Francisco, and named for labor leader Tom Mooney, who had died on March 6 that year. It later moved to a 5-story building at 216 Market Street, and in 1947 bought premises at 240 Golden Gate Avenue.

The school was supported by 72 trade unions, including members of the American Federation of Labor and the Congress of Industrial Organizations. Its initial program "promised to analyze social, economic and political questions in light of the present world struggle against fascism". It also taught the arts: the teenage Maya Angelou had a scholarship to study dance and drama. The school taught students on many subjects such as labor organization, journalism, music, drama, history, women's studies, economics and industrial arts. Union officials and professors from Stanford University and the University of California at Berkeley taught the courses at CLS. The most popular course at the CLS called "Mental Hygiene Today" was taught by Erik Erikson. The most important history course was called "History and Problems of the Negro in America". The school offered different kinds of services such as preparing union pamphlets and newspapers, conducting dance concerts and theatrical shows at local meetings.

=== Funding ===
The largest funder of the CLS was the International Longshore and Warehouse Union (ILWU), headed by Harry Bridges. The American Federation of Labor (AFL), Congress of Industrial Organizations (CIO), American Veterans Committee, and the National Association for the Advancement of Colored People (NAACP) also supported it.

=== Attendance and closure ===
From 1945 to 1947 the school was accredited for veterans' education under the G.I. Bill of Rights, and by 1947 there were 220 full-time students, among the 1800 students attending 135 classes. In 1948 the school was placed on the Attorney General's List of Subversive Organizations and attendances declined. The school closed in 1957.

== Faculty and teachers ==
David Jenkins was the initial director and Holland Roberts was the first education director for this "people's school."

- Victor Arnautoff
- Jules Carson
- Isobel M. Cerney
- Imogen Cunningham
- Pele de Lappe, figure drawing in the 1940s.
- Margaret De Patta
- Garrett Eckbo
- Erik Erikson
- Claire Falkenstein
- Philip S. Foner, lectured at CLS, as a guest from the Jefferson School.
- Mary Fuller (sculptor)
- Edith Heath
- Mimi Kagan
- Freda Koblick
- Peter Macchiarini
- Pablo O'Higgins
- Tillie Olsen
- Giacomo Patri
- Byron Randall
- Anton Refregier
- Dave Sarvis, director of theater
- Zahara Schatz, taught at the Berkeley campus
- Howard Selsam, lectured at CLS, as a guest from the Jefferson School.
- Celeste Strack
- Oleta Yates

== Legacy ==
Archives of the school's material are held in the Labor Archives & Research Center of California State University and the University of Michigan.

The Graphic Arts Workshop (GAW) of San Francisco, a cooperative print studio, was founded in 1952 by several artists from the California Labor School.

== Los Angeles People's Educational Center ==
From 1944 to 1948, the school ran a "counterpart" or "extension" called the "People's Educational Center" (or "Peoples Educational Center). Its head was Dorothy Healey, head of the Communist Party of Los Angeles. Frances Eisenberg of Canoga Park High School served on its board of directors. John Howard Lawson was an instructor there. Robert E. Stripling stated that the center succeed the writers school of the League of American Writers. Sam Wood testified that Edward Dmytryk taught there. Oliver Carlson testified that William Wolfe of the ILGWU education department ran it, succeeded by Sidney Davison (sent from New York); Herbert Biberman taught there (Soviet theater), as did Guy Endore Robert Lees. Advisors included Lees, Lawson, Healey, Herbert Sorrell, Frank Tuttle, and Sondra Gorney.

== See also ==
- Rand School of Social Science (1906)
- Work People's College (1907)
- Brookwood Labor College (1921)
- New York Workers School (1923):
  - New Workers School (1929)
  - Jefferson School of Social Science (1944)
- Highlander Research and Education Center (formerly Highlander Folk School) (1932)
  - Commonwealth College (Arkansas) (1923-1940)
  - Southern Appalachian Labor School (since 1977)
- San Francisco Workers' School (1934)
  - California Labor School (formerly Tom Mooney Labor School) (1942)
- Continuing education
- Los Angeles People's Education Center

== External sources ==
- Jenkins, David (1993). "The Union Movement, the California Labor School, and San Francisco Politics, 1926-1988" (transcription as manuscript in PDF) (oral history interview). Interviewed by Lisa Rubens.
