= Packard (disambiguation) =

Packard was an American industrial manufacturing company, best known for its eponymous automobile marque.

Packard may also refer to:

- Packard (surname)
- Packard Business College, New York City
- Packard F.C., early 20th century soccer club, sponsored by the automaker
- Packard Formation, Mesozoic geologic formation in Mexico
- Packard Glacier, Antarctica
- Packard Jennings (born 1970), American artist
- Packard Proving Grounds, former automotive testing facility near Utica, Michigan, which once belonged to the above-mentioned automaker
- Packard Stadium, home park of the Arizona State Sun Devils baseball team
- Packard, Kentucky, ghost town
- Packard, Wisconsin, unincorporated community

== See also ==
- Packard Bell, Dutch computer manufacturer
- Packard Commission, appointed by U.S. President Reagan to study the management of the Department of Defense
- Hewlett-Packard, present-day electronics company, unrelated to the former industrial manufacturer
- The David and Lucile Packard Foundation, a charitable foundation created by Hewlett-Packard founder David Packard
