= Claus Sievert =

German-born American printmaker and illustrator

- Born: 1949; Detmold, Germany
- Died: 2009 (aged 59–60); California, United States
- Known for: printmaking, illustration

Claus Sievert, nicknamed the "tree guy" (1949–2009) was a German-born American printmaker and illustrator. He was known for his prints highlighting forms and the beauty of nature. He was a founding member of the Graphic Arts Workshop.

== Biography ==
He was born in 1949 in Detmold, Germany. Sievert first travelled to the United States as an American Field Service exchange student in 1966–1967, and attended high school in Fridley, Minnesota. He traveled often, and eventually Sievert moved to San Francisco in 1984, and later settling down in Grass Valley and Nevada City, California.

Sievert created etchings and hand colored them, and the subject of many works were local trees of Sierra Nevada, he was specifically inspired by the Pinus jeffreyi tree. Claus Sievert illustrated books through Sky Pony Press.

He died March 12, 2009, at the age of 59, after being hit in his car by a drunk driver on California State Route 49.

Sievert's art is featured in various public museum collections including the Fine Arts Museums of San Francisco (FAMSF), Oakland Museum of California, among others.
