= Herman Volz =

Swiss-American painter

- Born: Herman Roderick Volz; December 25, 1904; Zürich, Switzerland
- Died: December 30, 1990 (aged 86); San Jose, California
- Education: Art und Gewerbeschule, the Academy of Fine Art in Vienna
- Movement: Social realisim

Herman Roderick Volz (1904–1990) was a Swiss-American painter, muralist, lithographer, set designer, decorative artist and ceramist. He was politically active, vocal and often made social statements through his imagery and he was especially taken by the industrial horizon of his adopted home of San Francisco Bay Area. Many of his art pieces done for the Federal Art Project (FAP), for example, were of men at work and of docks, piers, and railroad yards.

== Biography ==
Herman Roderick Volz was born December 25, 1904, in Zürich, Switzerland. His first training was under the tutelage of his grandfather, a master in decorative arts. He then started his formal training at the Art und Gewerbeschule in Zürich, the Academy of Fine Art in Vienna, and travelled for four years in France, Spain, Italy, Africa and Holland, eventually moving to the San Francisco Bay Area in 1933. By 1938 he became a US citizen.

=== Early work ===
During the Great Depression, Volz was appointed to the position of supervisor in the Northern California Art Project and supervisor for the Federal Building mural project at the Golden Gate International Exposition (GGIE). He painted the two large murals on the front panels of Timothy Pflueger's Federal Building, entitled "The Conquest of the West by Land" and "The Conquest of the West by Sea." The two-part mural measured sixty feet by one-hundred sixty feet. Volz's assistants included Jose Ramis, John Saccaro, John Thomas Hayes (Tom Hayes), Carlton Williams, Peter Lowe, Percy Freer, Robert P. McChesney, Alden Clark and Ernest Lenshaw. Volz created two large, 50′ x 45′ low-relief polished marble mosaic panels, representing organic science and inorganic science, as part of "Art in Action" at the Golden Gate International Exposition in 1940. These were later installed at San Francisco City College. The two mosaic panels took two years to install with a staff of eight workmen, Juan Breda served as assistant mosaicist for the project. The murals are named Organic and Inorganic Science. The imagery of the mosaics represent fields such as physics, chemistry, biology, and mathematics with text accompanying the mural that reads ‘Give me a base and I move the world.’

=== Later work ===
From 1944 to 1948 he worked in Hollywood, as a scenic artist and technical director at Actors' Laboratory Theatre and he designed sets for MGM and Paramount Studios.

In the 1960s he became a resident of San Jose, California.

Volz died on December 30, 1990, in San Jose, California.

== Work ==
=== Exhibitions ===
- 1927, Berlin National Exhibition
- 1937, Paris Salon
- 1938–1941, San Francisco Art Association (SFAA)
- 1939, Golden Gate International Exposition (GGIE)
- 1942, solo exhibition at the E.B. Crocker Art Gallery in Sacramento

=== Memberships ===
Council of Allied Arts in Los Angeles, California Watercolor Society (renamed the California National Watercolor Society in 1967)
