= California Faience =

Pottery studio in Berkeley, California, US

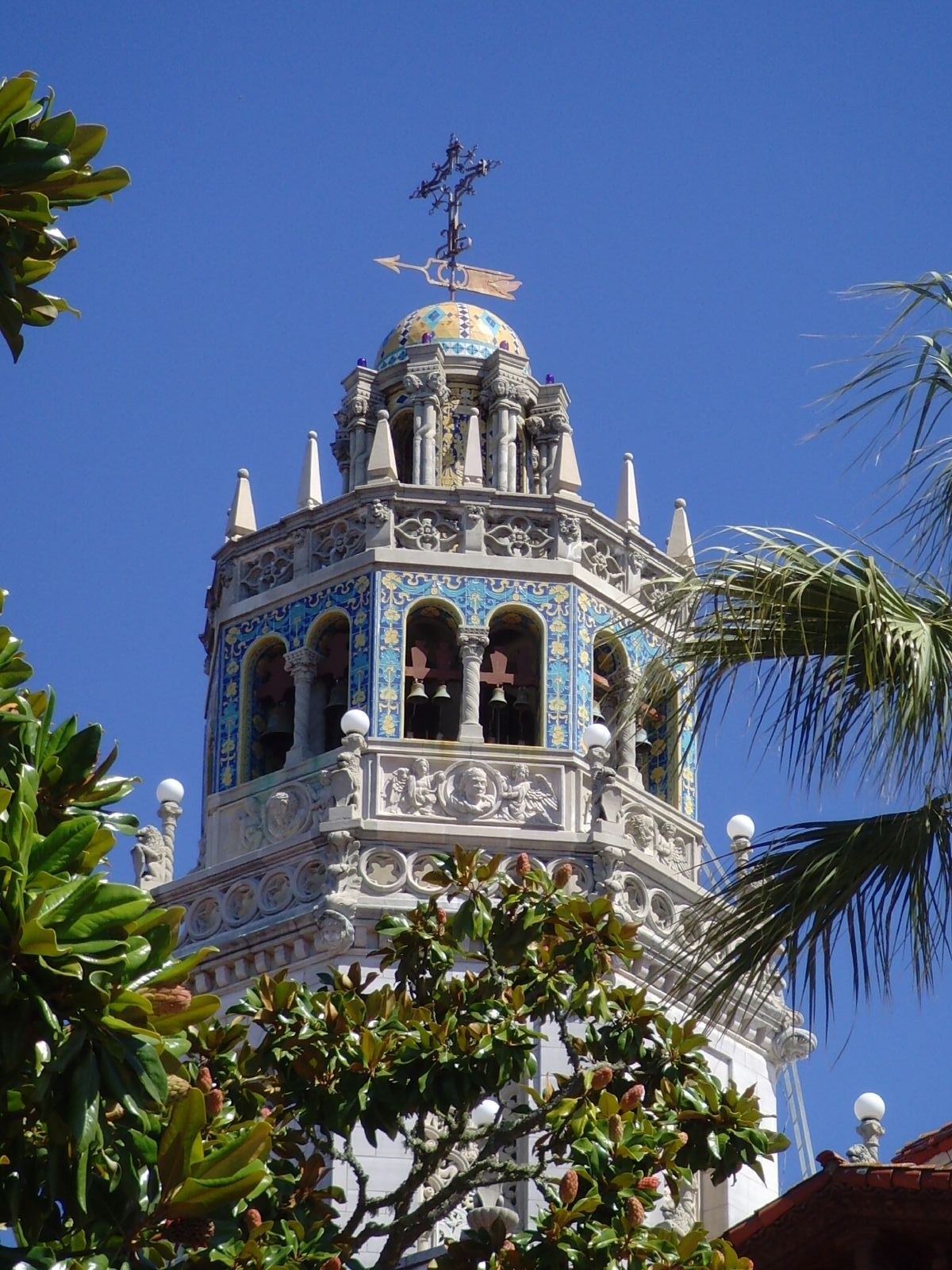
Hearst Castle detail, showing tiles supplied by California Faience

California Faience was a pottery studio in Berkeley, California, in existence from 1915 to 1959. The pottery produced tiles, decorative vases, bowls, jars and trivets. The pottery was founded by William Victor Bragdon and Chauncey R. Thomas who also taught at the California School of Arts and Crafts in Oakland, California. The name refers to a pottery style and technique: faience.

== Background ==
Chauncey R. Thomas began the studio in 1913 as The Tile Shop and it was located on San Pablo Avenue in Berkeley. William V. Bragdon joined Thomas as a partner in the fall of 1915. In 1922 they moved to a larger building in order to fulfill a 1921 contract for tiles from architect Julia Morgan who used them on William Randolph Hearst's mansion Hearst Castle.

Bragdon was a classmate of Thomas at Alfred University. When Thomas moved to California, Bragdon stepped in to take up the teaching position Thomas had previously held at the University of Chicago. Bragdon began his career in ceramics at University City Porcelain Works near St. Louis, Missouri in 1912. The business closed down in 1914.

Thomas then invited Bragdon to move to California in 1915, where Bragdon began teaching at the California School of Arts and Crafts (CSAC) in Oakland. Bragdon moved his family to Berkeley from St. Louis in the summer of 1915. Thomas and Bragdon together focused on producing pottery and tiles for the 1915 Panama–Pacific International Exhibition (PPIE) in San Francisco. A verbal partnership agreement was made on November 9, 1915 and a formal written partnership agreement was signed on May 30, 1917.

Bragdon was an expert in the areas of mold-making as well as developing glazes. Both Thomas and Bragdon taught sporadically at CSAC, and Bragdon was also employed at the American Bisque Doll Company in Berkeley.

== Artists ==
Some of the artists associated with California Faience are: Beniamino Bufano, Julia Morgan, Valenti Angelo, Sorcha Boru, Adele Stimmel Chase, Jane Fauntz and Mary Fuller. Several schools in the East Bay would have students make pieces from clay and glazes provided by California Faience. The work was then sold by California Faience. The longest relationship between a school and California Faience was likely with Berkeley High School (California).

== Tiles ==
California Faience produced two kinds of tiles, decorative and architectural. The decorative tiles were known as tea tiles and basically served the purpose of being a trivet, protecting furniture from being burned from hot teapots and other hot objects. Tea tiles could have a simple or ornate design. Some were also framed and hung on walls like paintings. Botanical subjects were common, flowers such as California Poppy, Irises and Morning Glories especially. Birds such as peacocks or geese were another common theme on tiles. Architectural forms also appeared on tiles, including depictions of Carmel Mission (Mission San Carlos Borromeo de Carmelo) and Sather Tower located on the campus of University of California, Berkeley. Landscapes, ships, geometric designs, trees as well as people were other features on tiles. Architectural tiles were both decorated and plain in their appearance.

== Hearst Castle ==
The Hearst Castle employs California Faience tile on its exterior. Architects such as Julia Morgan used the pottery company's tiles, as for William Randolph Hearst at San Simeon. The 1920s were peak years for tile production, often "brilliantly multi-colored", with Spanish and medieval inspired designs. The pottery business withered during the Great Depression, but the business survived until 1959 as a studio.
