= Mary Fuller (sculptor) =

American sculptor (1922–2022)

Mary Fuller McChesney
- Born: October 20, 1922; Wichita, Kansas, U.S.
- Died: May 4, 2022 (aged 99); Petaluma, California, U.S.
- Other names: Joe Rayter, Melissa Franklin
- Occupation(s): Sculptor and art historian
- Spouse: Robert McChesney

Mary Fuller McChesney (October 20, 1922 – May 4, 2022) was an American sculptor and art historian. She was a 1975 National Endowment for the Arts fellow.

== Early life and education ==
McChesney was born to Robert Fuller and Karen Rasmussen on October 20, 1922, in Wichita, Kansas and grew up in Stockton, California after moving there at age two with her family. She attended the University of California, Berkeley, where she studied philosophy with Paul Marhenke.

Leaving before graduating, she became a welder in the Richmond, California shipyard, during World War II, and potter at California Faience.

== Career ==
She started a ceramics business of her own, along with her partner Avrum "Bill" Rubenstein: "Two Fish Pottery". She held her first solo art show, of paintings and clay sculptures, Artists’ Guild Gallery (an artists’ co-op) in San Francisco. Through her association with The Artists' Guild Gallery, she became acquainted with a wide variety of her contemporary artists, including Hassel Smith, Ed Corbett, Emmy Lou Packard, Robert P. McChesney, George Goya, John Hultbert, Clyfford Still, and Ad Reinhardt.

She married Robert McChesney in December 1949; they lived in the North Bay area. They moved to Sonoma Mountain in Sonoma County near Petaluma, California in 1952, after living in Mexico for a year, and lived and worked there through Robert McChesney's death in 2008, after which Mary remained there, continuing to work, until the late 2010s. During their time in Guadalajara, Mexico, she began writing seriously, publishing a story in "New Story," and embarking upon writing mystery novels, publishing her first in 1953. She also began writing articles for Art Digest, then for Artforum.

She experimented with different sculpture formats, including wood and stone, before developing the cement mixed with vermiculite that she used for the majority of her work. She received her first public art commission for a work in Salinas, followed by her work for San Francisco General Hospital and many subsequent commissions.

Fuller died at an assisted living facility in Petaluma, California on May 4, 2022, at the age of 99. The research materials for her books are held at the Archives of American Art.

== List of public artwork ==
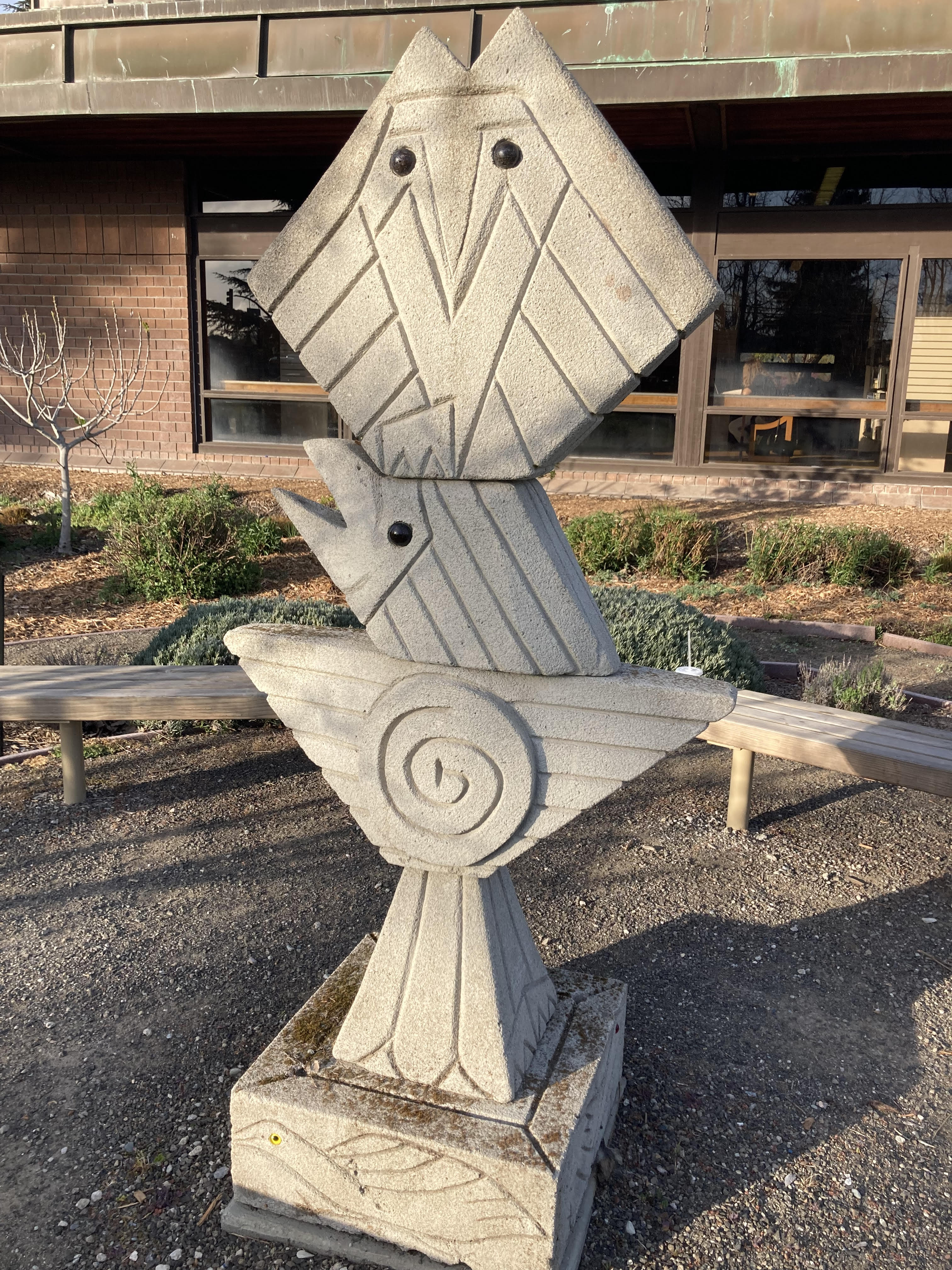
Mary Fuller McChesney at Petaluma Library, Petaluma, California

- 1974 “Dos Leones,” San Francisco General Hospital, San Francisco, California
- 1975 “Temko Lions,” Frenso Avenue, Berkeley, California
- 1975 Children’s Sculpture Park, Salinas Community Center, Salinas, California
- 1977 Falcon Andrew Hill High School, San Jose, California
- 1978 “Yuba Totem,” Yuba Lion California Arts Council Award for the Department of Motor Vehicles Building, Yuba City, California
- 1992 “Gualala Shakti,” Gualala, California
- 1982 “Tot-Lot,” Portsmouth Square, San Francisco, California
- 1983 “Olympic Lions,” Squaw Valley, California
- 1983 “Stratford Memorial Lion & Bear,” Petaluma Library, Petaluma, California
- 1984 “Anshen-Mays Garden Sculptures,” Sausalito, California
- 1985 “Earth, Air, Sea,” West Side Pump Station, San Francisco, California
- 1988 Random Ridge Winery Gate, Napa, California
- 1986 Robinson Totem, Santa Rosa, California
- 1987 Playground Sculptures, Los Angeles State Office Bldg., Los Angeles, California
- 1989 Rebecca Hirsch Totem, Mill Valley, California
- 1993 “Seacliff Park Benches,” Santa Cruz, California
- 1994 “Broadway Plaza Totem,” Walnut Creek, California
- 1996 “Portsmouth Square Lions,” San Francisco, California
- 1997 “Peace Totem,” Cape Cod, Massachusetts
- 1999 Sogin Wall, Occidental, California
- 2001 Becky Temko Park, Berkeley, California
- 2001 Rainbow Ridge, Reno, California
- 2002 Annex Gallery Fountain, Santa Rosa, California
- 2003 Petaluma Animal Shelter Sculpture, Petaluma, California
- 2019 Three Outdoor Sculptures, Petaluma Library, Petaluma, California

== Writing ==
- A Period of Exploration: San Francisco 1945–1950 Oakland Museum, 1973, OCLC 754950

Under pen-names:

- Rayter, Joe (mysteries)
  - The Victim Was Important New York, Scribner, 1954, OCLC 9526317
  - Asking for Trouble New York : M.S. Mill and W. Morrow, 1955, OCLC 317837980
  - Stab In the Dark New York, M.S. Mill and W. Morrow, 1955, OCLC 2978566
- Franklin, Melissa
  - Courier of Desire San Diego, Greenleaf Classics, 1969, OCLC 657708966
  - Murder In Her Thighs San Diego, Corinth Publications, 1969, OCLC 666424742
  - Nymphs, Horses, and Athletes New York, Ophelia Press, 1979, OCLC 157135
  - Putting on the Dog San Diego, Greenleaf Classics, 1971, OCLC 874768193
