= Congregation B'nai David =

Former historic synagogue, now residences, in San Francisco, California, US

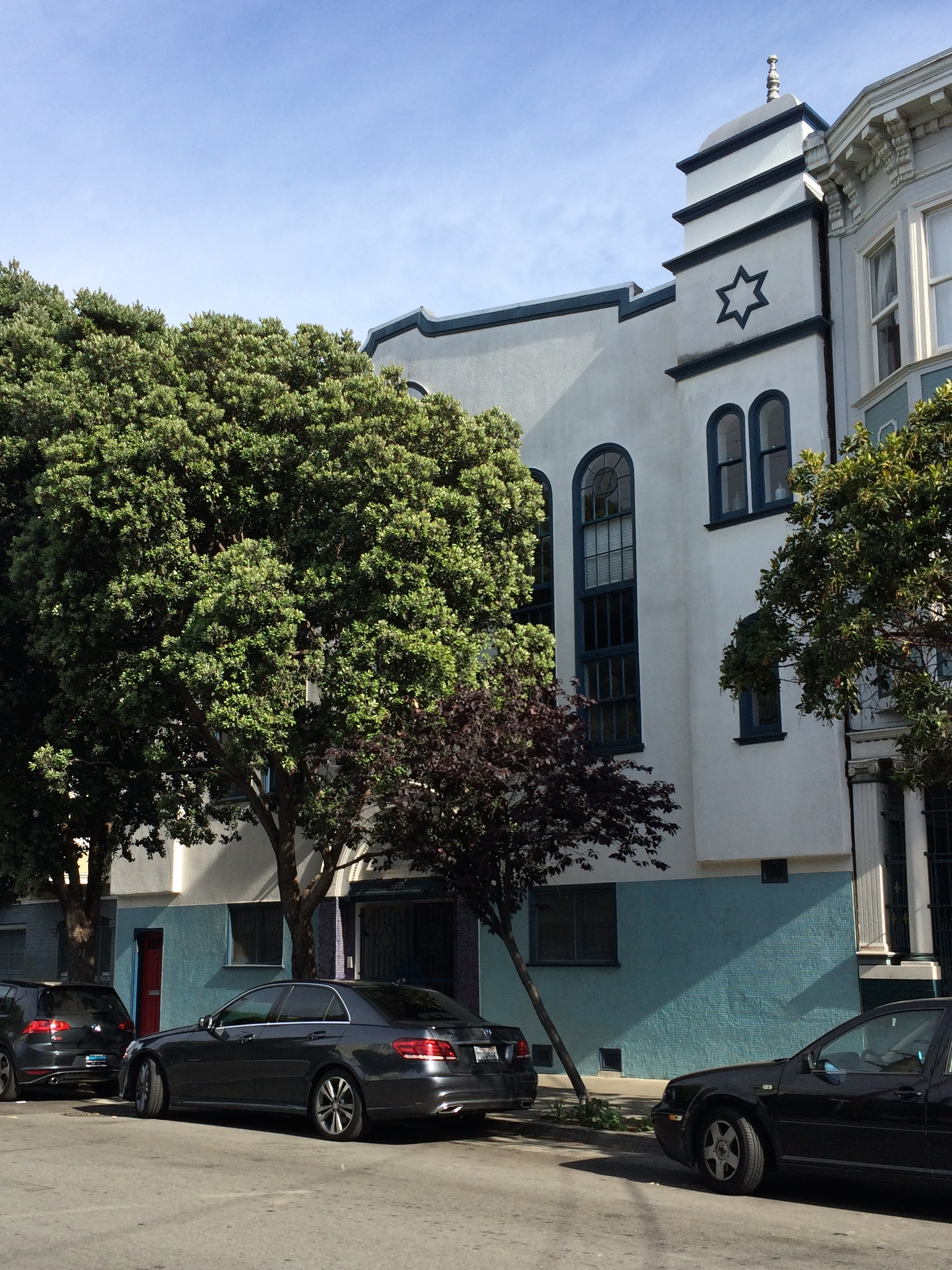
- The former synagogue building, in 2015

- Location of the former synagogue in central San Francisco

Religion
- Affiliation: Orthodox Judaism (1908–1978)
- Ecclesiastical or organizational status: Synagogue (1908–1978)
- Status: Closed (as a synagogue); Repurposed as condominia

Location
- Location: 3535 19th Street, Mission District, San Francisco, California
- Country: United States
- Interactive map of Congregation B'nai David
- Coordinates: 37°45′36″N 122°25′20″W

Architecture
- Completed: 1908

San Francisco Designated Landmark
- Designated: October 5, 1980
- Reference no.: 118

Congregation B'nai David is a former Orthodox Jewish congregation and synagogue, located at 3535 19th Street, in the Mission District of San Francisco, California, in the United States. The synagogue was built in 1908 and abandoned in 1978, due to a decling congregation. This building contained the first northern Californian mikveh, and Orthodox Jews would travel to visit it. Many of the parishioners were immigrants from Poland, Russia, and Romania.

Attendance declined in the 1930s, and regular services ended in the 1960s. The congregation ceased to worship in 1978 and the building was closed. The mikveh was moved to Menorah Square, a Jewish retirement home in Pacific Heights.

Freda Koblick, an artist, purchased the building in 1980 as her art studio and residence. It was later converted into multiple residences.

The building was listed as a San Francisco Designated Landmark on October 5, 1980.

== See also ==
- History of the Jews in San Francisco
- List of San Francisco Designated Landmarks
