= Adele Stimmel Chase =

American artist (1917–2000)

- Born: October 17, 1917; San Francisco, California, United States
- Died: December 29, 2000 (aged 83)
- Education: California School of Fine Arts; Stanford University; University of California, Berkeley (1938); California College of Arts and Crafts (1961)
- Occupation: Artist
- Known for: Ceramics; Sculpture; Painting
- Website: Official website

Adele Stimmel Chase (October 17, 1917 – December 29, 2000) was an American artist who worked in ceramics, metal sculpture and painting.

== Early life and education ==
Adele Stimmel was born in San Francisco on October 17, 1917. She lived in the San Francisco Bay Area her entire life. Stimmel studied at the California School of Fine Arts and in 1938, graduated from the University of California, Berkeley. She also earned a teaching credential from Stanford University. In 1939, she married Julius Chase. She received a Master of Fine Arts degree from the California College of Arts and Crafts in 1961. Her thesis was titled "A discriminative study of the growth and development of the ceramic industry in California and its relation to the studio potter in the San Francisco Bay Area".

== Art career ==
Around 1946, she began working with California Faience, producing ceramic figurines. Her work was marketed across the country. According to Chase, her products were sold at high end retailers like Marshall Field's in Chicago and Garfinckel's in Washington, DC. She also produced ceramic tiles, and was called the "backbone of the artistic community" at California Faience during her six years there.

In the 1960s, Chase started a ceramics workshop in Berkeley, California, where she produced mostly handmade tile in the style she had learned from William Bragdon at California Faience. She later moved her gallery to Point Richmond, followed by Oakland.

Her painting style in the 1970s incorporated elements of Pop art and Op art. During a 1972 exhibition of her work, she said, "I am engrossed with the interplay of contemporary pattern and the abstraction and stylization of them related to organic form."

She exhibited her work extensively and continued creating her art until her death on December 29, 2000.

== Legacy ==
Examples of her work were included in a 2015 exhibition called Of Cottages and Castles: The Art of California Faience, which was on display at the Crocker Art Museum in Sacramento and at the Pasadena Museum of California Art.
