= Robert P. McChesney =

American artist

Robert Pearson McChesney (1913–2008) was a California post-war artist, abstract expressionist painter, assemblage artist, printmaker, sculptor and teacher. He is considered one of the "progenitors of Bay Area abstract expressionism".

== Life ==
He grew up in Marshall, Missouri. From 1933 to 1934 he studied at Washington University School of Fine Arts in St. Louis, and in 1936 at the Otis Art Institute in Los Angeles.

He worked the Federal Art Project in San Francisco, and on murals for the Golden Gate International Exposition. At the exposition, McChesney worked with a team of around 10 people, on a mural series designed and directed by artist, Herman Volz. It consisted of two large mural on two sides of a large federal building called The Conquest of the West, and on one side of the building it wasBy Landand the other wasBy Sea. This particular mural was the world's largest at the time. Other artists that worked on this multi-year mural project included artist helping including: Jose Ramis, John Saccaro, John Thomas Hayes (Tom Hayes), Carlton Williams, Peter Lowe, Percy Freer, Alden Clark and Ernest Lenshaw.

He was a merchant marine seaman, during World War II. He taught at California State University, Hayward (1958–1962), the California Labor School as well as the California School of Fine Arts.

He married Frances (a former artist figure model) in 1937; they later divorced. His second marriage was to Mary Fuller, an artist and author, in December 1949. They lived in the North Bay, in the San Francisco Bay Area. Settling down in the Sonoma Mountain area in Petaluma, California.

McChesney died in 2008.
