= Freda Koblick =

American plastic artist (1920–2011)

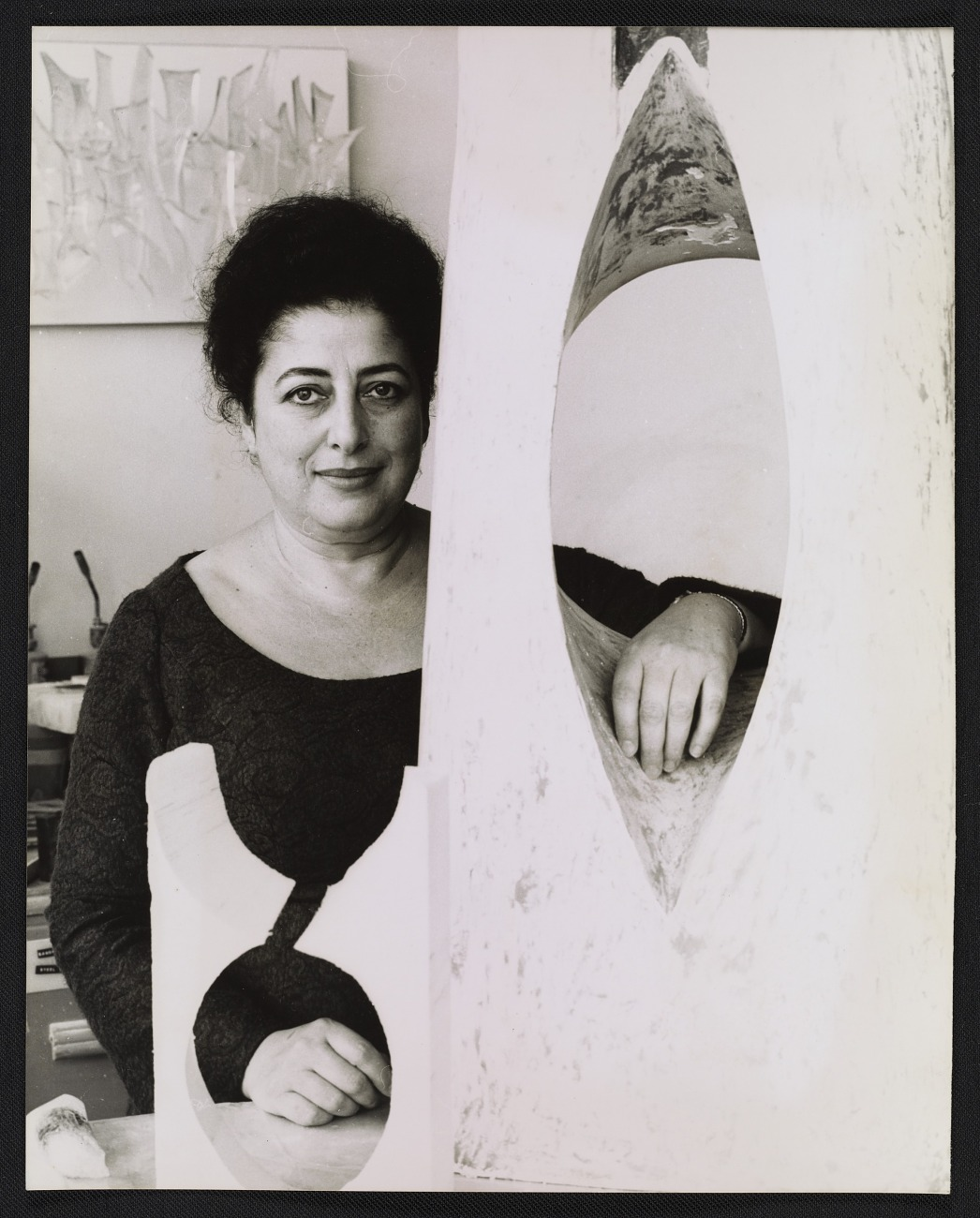
- Born: August 26, 1920; San Francisco, California, U.S.
- Died: June 18, 2011 (aged 90); San Francisco, California, U.S.
- Education: City College of San Francisco, San Francisco State University, Plastics Industries Technical Institute

Freda Koblick (1920 – 2011) was an American artist, sculptor, and educator, she was known for plastics engineering, acrylic arts, and designing decorative art. Koblick introduced cast acrylic as a medium for sculpture.

== Early life and education ==
Freda Koblick was born on 26 August 1920 in San Francisco, California, into a Jewish, Russian American family. She attended City College of San Francisco (CCSF) and San Francisco State College (now San Francisco State University). In 1939, Koblick continued her studies at Plastics Industries Technical Institute in Los Angeles.

== Career ==
She returned to San Francisco in the early 1940s. Her first job was designing plastic molds for an office machinery factory in Emeryville. Early in her career she worked in collaboration with architects and created functional acrylic decorative objects for the home, including Lucite doorknobs, candle holders, trays, and lighting accessories.

Eventually by the 1960s, architects started asking for larger sculptural works made of acrylic, and she started transitioning into the acrylic arts. Koblick held her studio in the North Beach neighborhood at Battery Street and Clay Street. In 1956, her work space burned down and she had a period of studio displacement. However 1980, with the help of her friend Mariquita West she was able to purchase the 4,300-foot former Congregation B'nai David building in the Mission District and maintain the space as both an art studio and residence.

For many years she taught her acrylic casting techniques at the Royal College of Art. She received the Guggenheim Fellowship in 1970, in fine art.

=== Death ===
Koblick died on 18 June 2011 in San Francisco, California, from renal failure due to diabetes. She never married. For 30 years she had an affair with a married man, which she openly discussed.
