= Pele de Lappe =

- Self-Portrait, 1938
- Born: Phyllis deLappe; May 4, 1916; San Francisco, California, U.S.
- Died: October 1, 2007 (aged 91); Petaluma, California, U.S.
- Other names: Pele deLappe, Phyllis Murdock, Phyllis Edises, Pele Edises
- Education: San Francisco Art Institute, Art Students League of New York
- Years active: 1930–2007
- Known for: Paintings, Prints, Political Cartoons
- Movement: California Labor School, Communist Party USA
- Spouse(s): Bert Edises (1934–1949), Steve Murdock (1953–1969)
- Partner: Byron Randall (c.1990s–1999)
- Children: 2

Phyllis de Lappe, also known as Pele de Lappe or Pele deLappe (1916–2007) was an American artist, known for her social realist paintings, prints, and drawings. She also worked as a journalist, newspaper editor, illustrator, and political cartoonist. de Lappe had been a resident for many years in Berkeley, California and later, Petaluma, California.

== Early life and education ==
She was born as Phyllis deLappe on May 4, 1916 in San Francisco, California and was the fourth-generation of her family born in San Franciscan. Her father, Wes deLappe was a commercial artist and her mother was Dorothy Sheldon deLappe.

She started her career as an artist at age 14, studying art at California School of Fine Arts (now San Francisco Art Institute) under Arnold Blanch. Two years later she continued education at Art Students League of New York, working with artists Edward Lansing, Kenneth Hayes Miller, John Sloan and Charles Locke. While in New York, she befriended artists Frida Kahlo and Diego Rivera in the 1930s. This was during Rivera's Rockefeller Center mural, Man at the Crossroads and de Lappe modeled and assisted on the mural.

== Career ==
By 1934, she returned to San Francisco, joined the Communist party and became active in the labor movement. She taught figure drawing at the California Labor School during the 1940s. She also worked in the 1940s as an editor and political cartoonist for The People's World, a labor movement newspaper. She additionally worked as an illustrator for other newspapers, including: Daily Worker, The New Masses, L'Unita Operaia, West Oakland Beacon, and the San Francisco Chronicle.

In 1952, de Lappe alongside several artists from the California Labor School went on and founded the Graphic Arts Workshop (GAW), a cooperative printmaking studio in San Francisco.

In 1999, she published her autobiography, Pele: A Passionate Journey through Art and the Red Press.

Her artwork is in many public collections, including: National Gallery of Art, the Smithsonian Institution's National Portrait Gallery, Fine Art Museums of San Francisco (FAMSF), Syracuse University, and the Library of Congress.

== Personal life ==
In 1934, she married lawyer, Bertram "Bert" Edises and together they had two children. The couple divorced in 1949. She was married from 1953 until 1969 to Steve Murdock, a writer for People's World the labor movement newspaper.

She moved to Petaluma in the 1990 to be closer to her friend and longtime partner, artist Byron Randall and this romance lasted until his death in 1999.
