= Giacomo Patri =

Italian-born American artist and teacher

Giacomo Patri (1898–1978) was an Italian-born American artist and teacher.

Based in San Francisco, Patri taught at the California Labor School following World War II. Due to its pro-labor agenda, the school was closed in the 1950s under the pressures of McCarthyism.

In 1938, after three years of work, Patri produced the wordless novel White Collar using linocut printing. It chronicled the aftermath of the 1929 stock market crash, and was intended to motivate white-collar workers to unionize. Woodcut artist and fellow wordless novelist Lynd Ward reviewed the book in Office and Professional Workers News in 1941.

From 1948 until 1966, Patri ran his own art school.

== Wordless Novels ==
- White Collar. Self-Published; San Francisco, California; 1939
- White Collar. Self-Published; San Francisco, California; 1940
- White Collar. Pisani Printing and Publishing Co; San Francisco, California; 1941
- White Collar. Celestial Arts; Millbrae, California; 1975
- Col Blanc. Divers Interforum (Zones); Paris, France; 2007
- White Collar. Dover Publications; Mineola, New York; 2016
