= H. D. Packard =

Australian surveyor

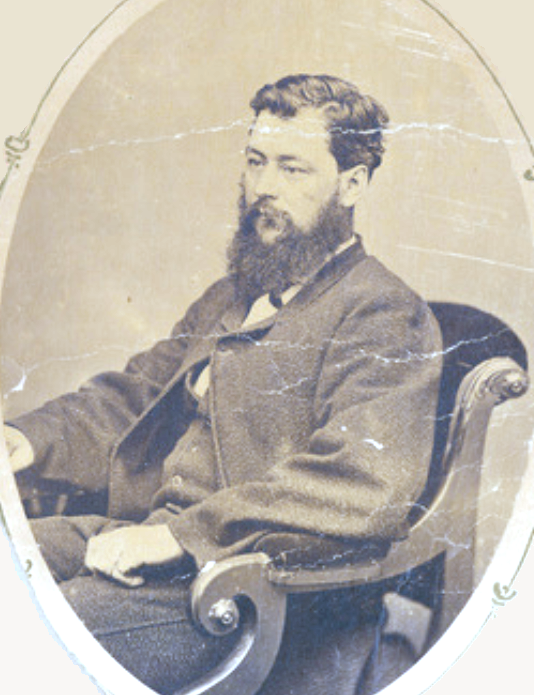
H. D. Packard, cadet surveyor, c.1870

Harrison Daniel Packard (1838 – 13 November 1874) was a surveyor in the early days of the colony of South Australia. He served at Escape Cliffs under B. T. Finniss, and later under G. W. Goyder at Port Darwin.

== History ==
Packard was a son of Rev. Daniel Packard, MA (Caius College, Cambridge) (c. 1810 – 12 May 1862) and his wife Sarah née Devereux (1814 – 9 March 1886), who married in December 1835. His father, rector of Middleton, Suffolk, was appointed to St Andrew's Anglican Church, Walkerville, South Australia.

They arrived in South Australia by ship Asia in September 1851, accompanied by their large family: G. A., Sarah Jane, Harrison D., Emily, Francis, A. E., Frederick, John, Alice, and Charles.

Packard joined the South Australian Survey Department in 1855.

In 1864 he was appointed second in command of the "Relief Party" sent to Escape Cliffs at the mouth of the Adelaide River, Northern Territory, to augment Colonel Finniss's expedition, which had been sent there to select and survey the site of a future settlement to be called Palmerston.

The original expedition under Finniss had not proceeded smoothly; little was accomplished due to the inhospitable site and incursions by marauding tribesmen; several men died, and two Aboriginal men were shot dead. The camp was split by jealousies and many left rather than face another wet season.

Packard and his wife, with their baby daughter only a few weeks old, left Port Adelaide in October 1864 for Escape Cliffs, where they remained, achieving little, for over two years. On 21 December 1866 his wife gave birth to their second child, Eleanor Devereux Packard, remembered as the first European born in the Northern Territory.

In 1868 he was appointed to the expedition to Port Darwin, under the Surveyor-General G. W. Goyder, and a year later his wife joined him. In 1870 he was appointed cadet Surveyor and a few years later he was acting Surveyor of the Northern Territory His wife remained in Darwin until, overcome by sickness and disease, she returned home in July 1874. Packard would have accompanied her could he have obtained leave of absence, but was forced to remain, the two maintaining contact via telegraph.

Packard died in Palmerston Hospital from an ulcerated throat, and was buried that same afternoon.

== Recognition ==
- Mount Packard in the Victoria-Daly Shire was named for him by G. G. McLachlan.
- Packard Place and Packard Street in Darwin were "named after R. D. Packard, a Surveyor Cadet in A. H. Smith's No. 3 party with G. W. Goyder's Expedition of 1869"

This error may derive from a newspaper misprint corrected to "H. D. Packard" in a later edition.

- Packards Knob (and hence Packard Avenue in Palmerston City) "commemorates Harrison D. Packard, who was one of George W. Goyder's cadet surveyors during his 1869 survey expedition"
- Packards Rivulet at Koolpinyah "was named by "Fred Litchfield . . . after his colleague, surveyor A. D. Packard, [another misprint] on 15 September 1865 during the Escape Cliffs survey 1864–66."

== Family ==
Rev. Daniel Packard (c. 1810 – 12 May 1862) married Sarah Devereux (1814 – 9 March 1886) in December 1835, emigrated to South Australia 1851. Their children were:

- Sarah Jane Packard (1837– )
- Harrison Daniel Packard (1838–1874) married Mary Bell (c. 1844 – 11 August 1921) in 1863

- Edith Mary Packard (18 June 1864 – )
- Eleanor Devereux Packard (21 December 1866 – ), the first white child born in the Territory.
- Edward Frank Packard (11 April 1869 – )
- Harriet Emily Packard (1871– )

- Emily Ester Packard (1839 – 14 January 1914) married Frederick Fisher Unwin on 3 October 1867
- Francis James "Frank" Packard (c. 1843 – 14 August 1866), a member of the first contingent to Escape Cliffs, was a brother. He drowned in the River Murray shortly before he was to testify at the trial of W. P. Auld for murder. He was with a survey party at Richard Holland's Piapco station, went for a swim and never returned.
- Frederick Joseph Packard (c. 1845 – 28 October 1920), solicitor of Penola, later of Burra, died at Kooringa.
- John Harrison Packard (1847 – 11 August 1929), surveyor, was a chainman with G. W. Goyder's Darwin Expedition of 1869. He married Mary Whinham ( – 19 October 1901), a daughter of John Whinham, on 8 April 1874. He was a founder of the Institute of Surveyors.
- Ada Elizabeth Packard ( – 19 October 1897) married Alfred Percy on 5 May 1879
- Jane Augusta Packard ( – 16 May 1903) married Fitzwilliam Evans in 1857, resident in England
- Alice Jane Packard ( – ) married Rev. William Frederick Marshall on 17 November 1874
- Charles Robert Packard (1850 or 1851 – 21 December 1853) died of scarlet fever

born in Australia

- Daniel Spencer Packard (20 September 1852 – 13 June 1896) was born at Darley, South Australia, and educated at St Peter's College, then was articled to his brother, F. J. Packard, solicitor, of Narracoorte and Penola, and completed his articles with Messrs. Symon & Bakewell and was called to the bar in 1877 and commenced practice in Burra in 1879, living at Kooringa. He was an energetic townsman and filled various important local positions, including that of Mayor. He died after a long illness and was buried at the North Road Cemetery. He married Florance Suzanne Randall, daughter of David Randall, had four children.

- Guy Spencer Packard (7 August 1884 – 29 September 1963) shipping executive married Alison Scott Richardson on 13 April 1918

- Sarah Mary Packard (1854 – )
- Charles Devereux Packard (20 July 1858 – 2 February 1864)
