= Walter Packard =

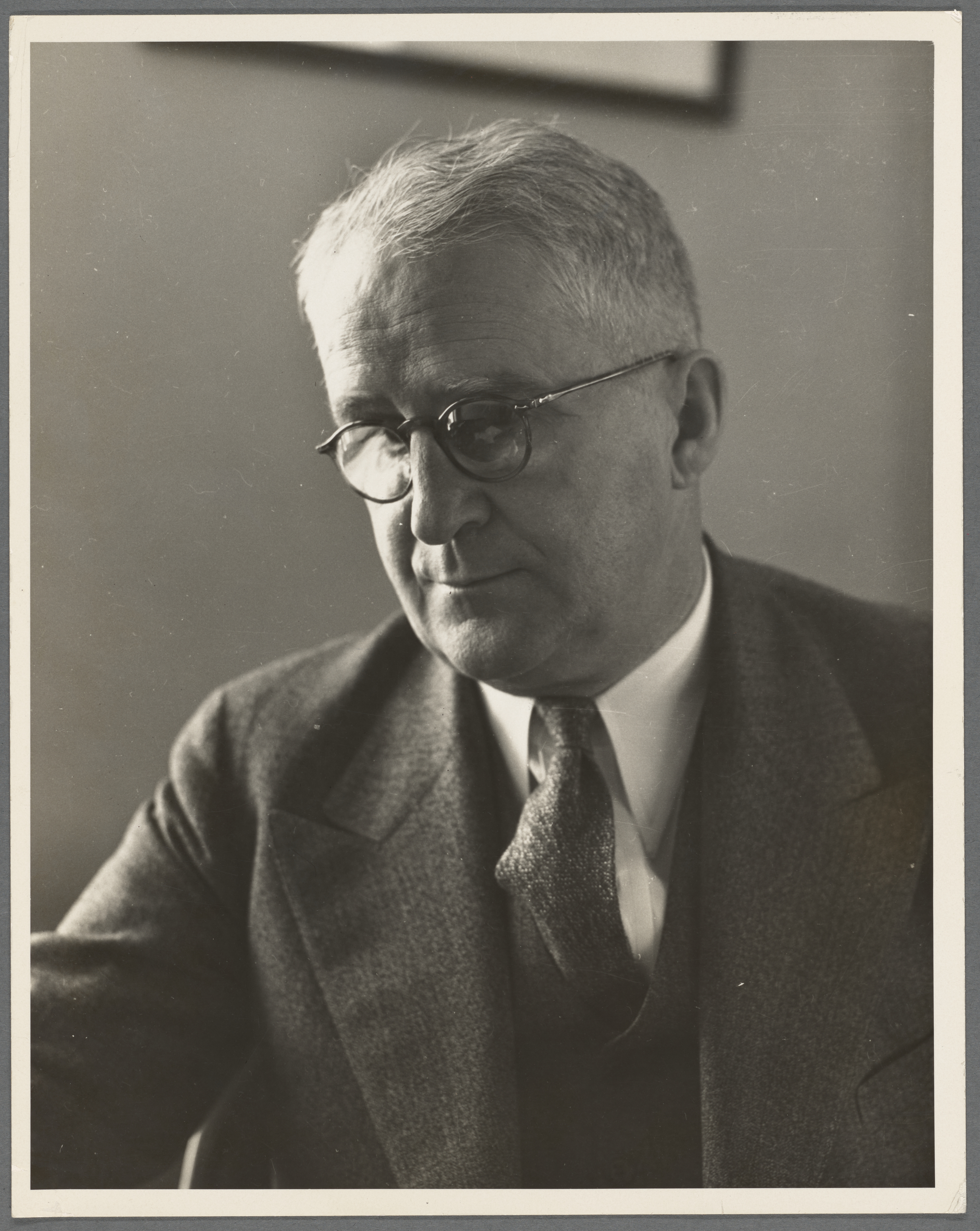
- Walter E. Packard in 1936 photographed by Dorothea Lange
- Born: 1884; Oak Park, Illinois
- Died: 1966 (aged 81–82); Berkeley, California
- Known for: Rural Economic and Agricultural Development

Walter Eugene Packard (1884 - 1966) was the National Director of the U.S. Rural Resettlement Division of the Resettlement Administration. Between 1933 and 1938 Packard worked with the Agricultural Adjustment Administration and then the Resettlement Administration becoming National Director. He continued to consult for the Farm Security Administration between 1939 and 1945 preparing a study of Linn County, Oregon and a report on the Central Valley Project for the Haynes Foundation.

Packard consulted internationally, working as the superintendent of the Delhi State Land Settlement and as the head of the National Irrigation Commission in the Department of Agriculture for the Mexican government. He spent four years in Mexico. The renowned painter, Diego Rivera, called him "a true friend of Mexico." He also worked as irrigation specialist for the American Mission for Aid to Greece and then as chief of land reclamation for the Economic Cooperation Administration in Greece. While in Greece in the early 1950s, he educated Greek villagers in how to irrigate their land to grow rice and Greece was able to export rice for the first time. According to Time Magazine, "the gain to the Greek economy on an original U.S. overseas-aid investment of $43,000 was over $10 million." This was considered the Marshall Plan's “Rice Miracle.” The people of Anthili, where he was located, erected a marble bust of him.

== Personal life ==
Packard was born in Oak Park, Illinois and received a Bachelor of Scientific Agriculture from Iowa State College and an M.S. degree from the University of California at Berkeley. He married Emma Lou Leonard. Their daughter was artist Emmy Lou Packard.
