= John Harrison Packard =

Surveyor in South Australia

John Harrison Packard (16 March 1847 – 11 August 1929) was a surveyor in the colony of South Australia. He served under G. W. Goyder in the initial survey of Port Darwin.

== History ==
Packard was born in Sussex to Rev. Daniel Packard (c. 1810 – 12 May 1862) and Sarah Packard, née Devereux, (1814 – 9 March 1886), who married in December 1835 and emigrated to South Australia in 1851. His father was to become the first incumbent of St Andrew's Anglican church, Walkerville.

He was educated at St Peter's College and began work at the South Australian government's Lands Department as a trainee surveyor, under Surveyor-General Goyder. He worked as chainman with Goyder's Darwin survey of 1869, (Note: The project was a last-ditch effort to restore South Australia's reputation, following a string of bathetic attempts to establish a new settlement ("Palmerston") near the mouth of the Adelaide River.) which, thanks to Goyder's careful planning and strenuous efforts by his army of workers, was completed in the space of one dry season. He was to return to the Territory several times, leading survey parties to Port Darwin and the country further south.

In 1880 he left the public service to work privately, and in 1882 was a founder of the South Australian chapter of the Institute of Surveyors.

Around 1882 he entered into partnership with C. J. Sanders, with which Charles Maddison Yeomans was involved from 1886, then in 1913 joined with Tasmanian-born Arthur James Seddon (c. 1882 – 13 May 1935) as senior partner in the firm Packard and Seddon, which operated for around 20 years. His name continued in the firm of Packard and Alexander.

He was mentor to Charles Buxton Anderson, who left school aged 13 around 1892.

In later years he took no active part in the company's work, but retained an interest in the business.

Packard lived at 30 Hughes street, North Unley. He died in a private hospital in Adelaide on 11 August 1929.

== Recognition ==
A memorial to Packard was established in 1933.

== Family ==
On 8 April 1874 he married Mary Whinham ( – 19 October 1901), a daughter of John Whinham. They had one child, John Whinham Packard (1875). He married again, to Louise Constance de Agreda Hector, of Port Pirie, on 8 April 1918.

Harrison Daniel Packard (1838 – 13 November 1874) was a brother.

Francis James "Frank" Packard (c. 1843 – 14 August 1866), member of the first surveying party to Escape Cliffs, Northern Territory, was a brother. He drowned in the River Murray shortly before he was to testify at the trial of W. P. Auld for murder.
