= Emmy Lou Packard =

American visual artist (1914–1998)

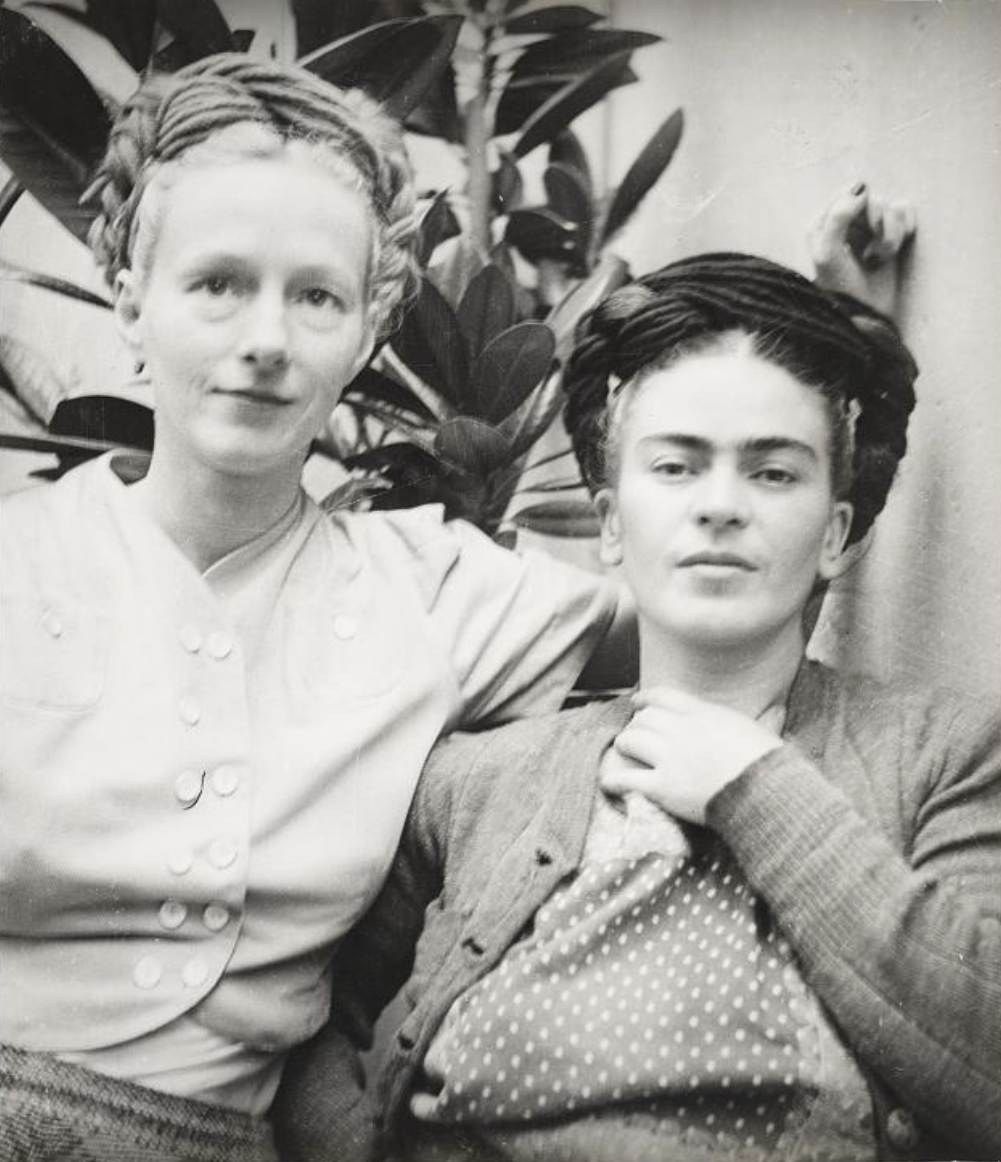
- Packard and Frida Kahlo (1941) in Coyoacán, Mexico City
- Born: April 15, 1914 near El Centro, California, United States
- Died: February 22, 1998 (aged 83); San Francisco, California, United States
- Education: University of California, Berkeley, San Francisco Art Institute
- Occupations: Visual artist, social activist, illustrator
- Years active: 1920s–1998
- Known for: Printmaking, painting, murals
- Movement: Social realism
- Spouse(s): Burton Cairns (m. 1934–1939; his death), Byron T. Randall (m. 1959–1972; divorced)

Emmy Lou Packard (1914–1998), also known as Betty Lou Packard, was an American visual artist and social activist in San Francisco, California. She was known for her paintings, printmaking, and murals, which were often political.

== Early life and education ==
Emmy Lou Packard was born on April 15, 1914, near El Centro, California, to parents Emma and Walter Packard. Her father founded an agricultural cooperative community in the Imperial Valley and was an internationally known agronomist. In 1927, the Packard family traveled to Mexico for Walter's consulting job with the Mexican government working on agrarian and land settlement reform issues. Emmy then 13 years, was already painting and drawing. Her mother introduced her to artists Diego Rivera and Frida Kahlo, marking the beginning of a long friendship and mentorship.

In 1934, she eloped to Nevada with the architect Burton Cairns, a recent graduate of the University of California, Berkeley. They had a baby together, Donald Cairns.

In 1936 Packard graduated from the University of California, Berkeley with her bachelor's degree and later studied sculpture, mural and fresco painting at the San Francisco Art Institute.

== Career ==
In 1939, her husband, Burton Cairns, died in a car accident. After his death, she traveled to Mexico to live with Rivera and Kahlo, working as their studio assistant. During the time she stayed with Rivera and Kahlo, she took a number of photographs of the couple.

When Diego Rivera came to San Francisco in 1940 for the Golden Gate International Exposition (GGIE), he asked Emmy to be the chief assistant for painting the Pan American Unity mural.

Between 1944 and 1945, she briefly worked as an illustrator of a labor newspaper for the San Francisco Bay Area shipyards.

On May 29, 1959, she married artist Byron T. Randall; they divorced in 1972.

In the mid-1960s, Packard designed and executed the mural on the exterior of the dining commons at the University of California, Berkeley in the Lower Sproul student union center. She also designed the terrace parapet which is embellished with an 85-foot long, 5-foot high, bas-relief, Modernist mural depicting California landscape features, including coastal bluffs, cultivated fields, mountains, and rivers located in the central façade of Chávez Student Center at the University of California, Berkeley in the Lower Sproul.

In 1960 and 1975, Packard and Dorothy Wagner Puccinelli restored murals, including Coit Tower.

Packard was an active community member in the Mission District of San Francisco and San Francisco's community mural movement. In 1974 she served as a mural technical adviser for Homage To Siqueiros (1974), the Bank of America building mural project located at Mission Street and 23rd Street; the local artists that painted this mural are Jesús “Chuy” Campusano, Luis Cortázar and Michael Rios.

== Death and legacy ==
Packard died on February 22, 1998, in San Francisco, California, of diabetes and related illnesses.

In 2022, the Richmond Art Center held an exhibition of Packard's linocuts: "Emmy Lou Packard: Artist of Conscience."
