= Abraham Markoff =

CPUSA leader and co-founder of Workers Schools

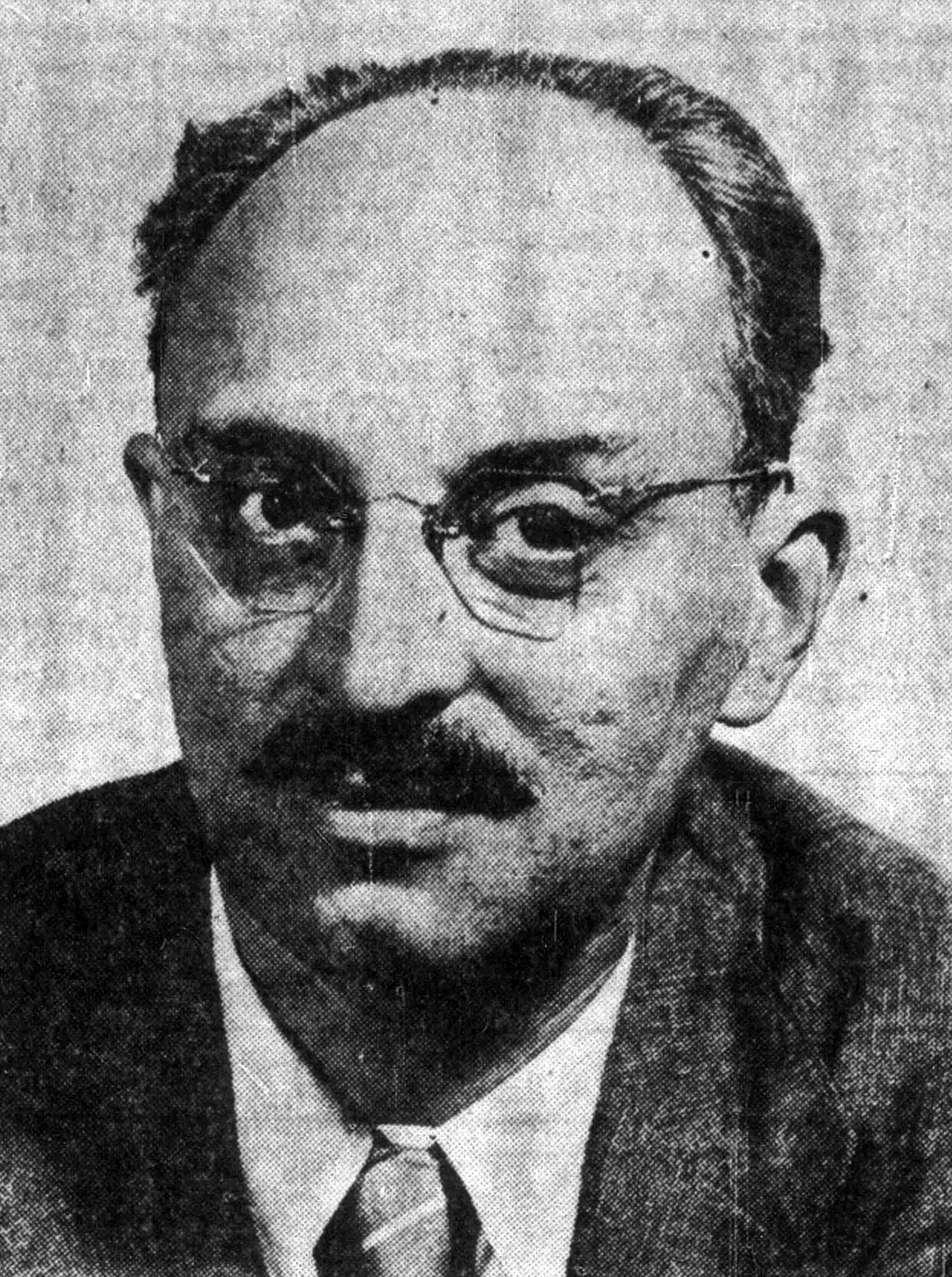
Abraham Markoff

Abraham Markoff (1887–1939), AKA "A. Markoff" and "Professor A. Markoff" in Marxist publications, was a Russian-born American and Communist Party member who founded and served as the first director of the New York Workers School.

== Background ==
Abraham Markoff was born on May 11, 1887, in the Russian Empire. He had a brother Allan Markoff.

== Career ==
=== Marxist ===
Markoff took part in the failed 1905 Russian Revolution and soon after immigrated to the USA.

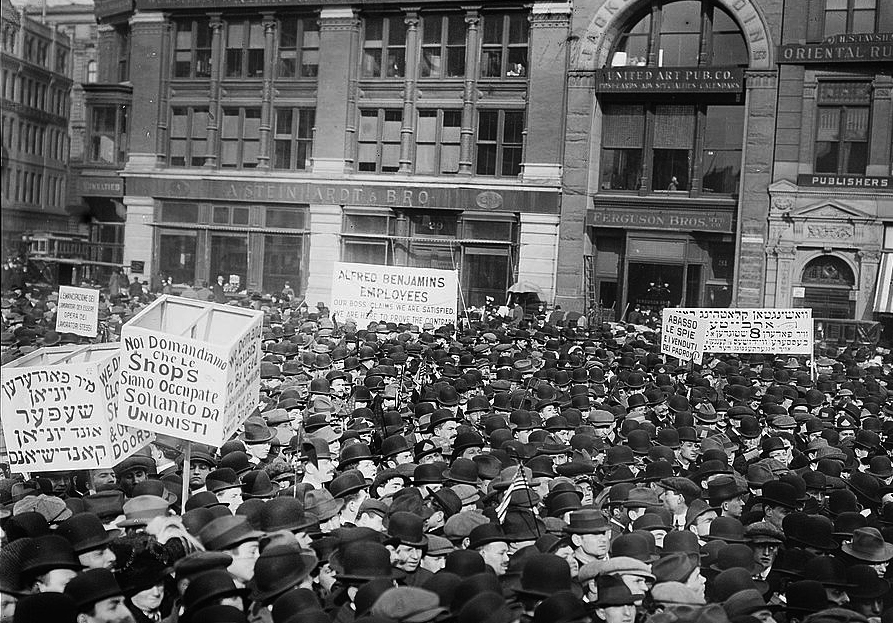
Markoff founded the New York Workers School, long housed in Union Square, Manhattan (pictured here during a 1913 May Day rally with signs in Yiddish, Italian and English)

In 1923, Markoff founded the New York Workers School as well as its Ruthenberg Library. Elegist Moissaye J. Olgin noted the Workers School was at the right place at the right time in 1929, when the Great Depression began and "demand for a more earnest study of Marxism-Leninism" soared. In curricula, he paid special attention to the "study of the history and problems of the Negro people." Annual attendance during Markoff's decade of direction rose from 2,000 in 1929 to 9,000 in 1939. Annual attendance rose from 46 students in 1923–1924 to 5,903 in 1933-1934 (and 7,280 registered). In 1938, Earl Browder topped the bill to celebrate 15 years of the New York Workers School on a program that featured Markoff, Tim Holmes, the Deep River Boys, Marc Blitzstein, Anna Sokolow & Group, and the Chernishevsky Folk Dance Group at the Mecca Temple in Manhattan.

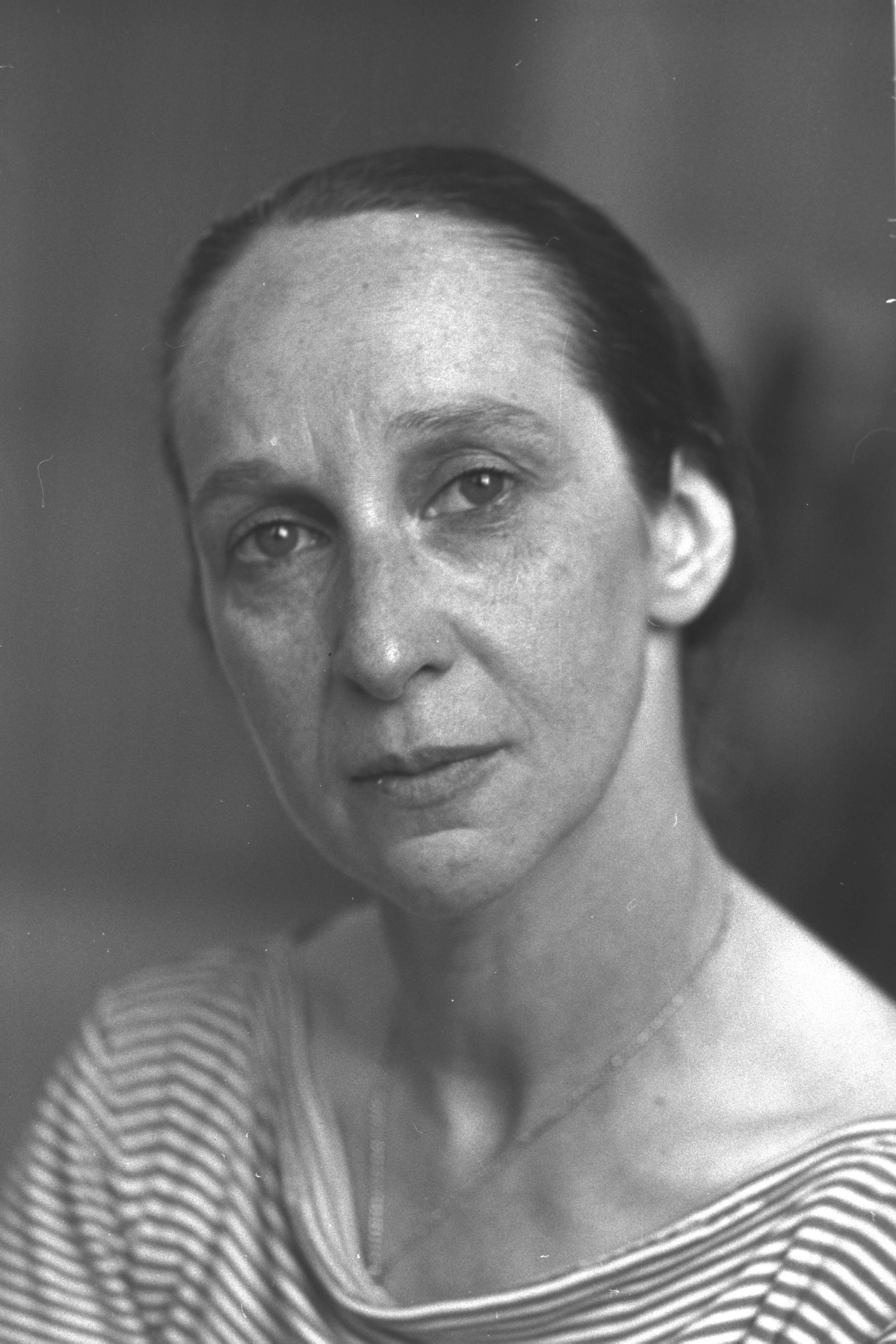
Anna Sokolow, American dancer and choreographer, helped celebrate the 15th anniversary of the New York Workers School, founded by Markoff

Among those teachers recruited directed by Markoff were Leonard Emil Mins (latter a research analyst in the Office of Strategic Services or "OSS") and Seymour A. Copstein (who testified before the Rapp-Coudert Committee in 1941).

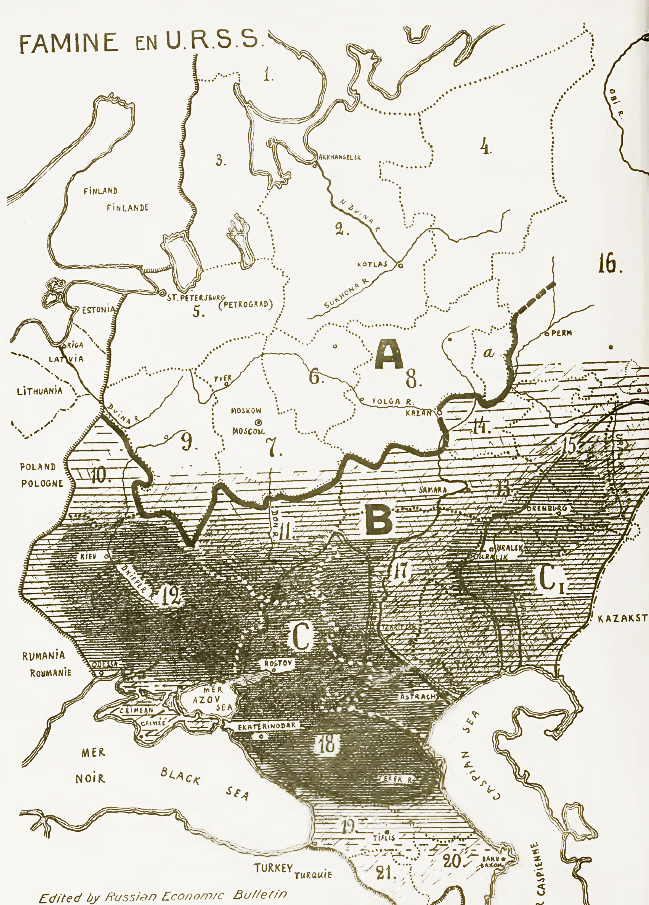
Areas of most disastrous famine marked with black from Famine in USSR by A. Markoff (1933)

Markoff was "organizer, builder, and leader of the various workers' school" as well as "special-training courses" for "Party functionaries." In 1934, schools named by Markoff included: Boston Workers' School (350 students), Workers' Schools of Chicago, Cleveland, San Francisco, Detroit, and other cities with similar numbers of students. "Up to about two years ago, the Workers' School in New York was the only institution of its kind in the Party," he wrote. He also confirmed that "The first and most important function of the schools is the teaching of the theory of Marxism-Leninism." A typical three-month curriculum often comprised studies in: Principles of Communism, Political Economy, History of the American Labor Movement, History of Class Struggles, Dialectic and Historical Materialism, Problems of the Negro Liberation Movement, History of the Russian Revolution, Public Speaking, and language courses.

In the 1920s, Markoff spoke publicly: an open-air meeting with Juliet Stuart Poyntz (October 4, 1924), at one of many May Day rallies in the New York City area (April 28, 1927), and on "Whither Russia?" (January 9, 1927)

Markoff also served as a member of the New York State committee of the CPUSA.

=== Politician ===
In 1932, Markoff ran for a seat in the United States House of Representatives on the Communist ticket for New York's 14th congressional district and in 1934 as an Independent for New York's 5th congressional district as well as New York General Assembly.

=== Dentist ===
In 1932, Max Shachtman mentioned "Dr. A. Markoff, who has been equally successful in the professions of dental surgery and Stalinist officialdom."

Markoff ran a drugstore at 119 Street at Second Avenue.

In 1926, an advertisement appeared in the Daily Worker CPUSA newspaper:

Telephone Lehigh 6022
DR. ABRAHAM MARKOFF
Surgeon Dentist
249 East 115th St., Cor. Second Ave.
NEW YORK CITY
Office Hours: 9:30-12 A.M. 2-8 P.M.
Daily Except Friday; Sunday 9 to 1 P.M.
Special rates to W.P. Members

(Addresses for the drugstore and dental office lie five minutes apart on foot.) A similar advertisement appears in a 1928 issue.

== Personal life and death ==
Markoff may have been married to Nancy Markoff, listed at "business manager" of The Liberator magazine in 1924.

Abraham Markoff died age 52 on August 29, 1939, of a heart attack in New York City. "Friends of Abraham Markoff" held a memorial for him at the Jefferson School of Social Science (successor the New York Workers School).

== Legacy ==
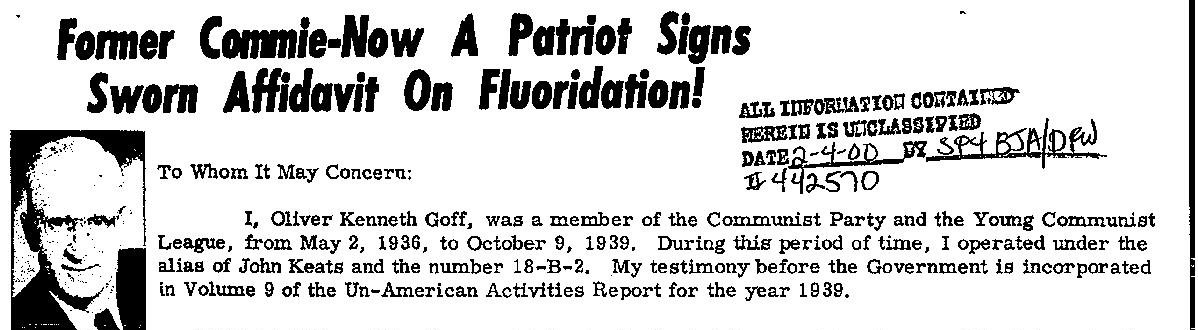
Kenneth Goff wrote about Markoff in 1948

In August 1939, at the time of his death, Party leader Earl Browder said of him, "The movement has lost one of its most modest, effective, and persevering workers." In October 1939, Moissaye J. Olgin wrote about his contributions to the CPUSA and Marxism in its October issue of The Communist (then, theoretical journal of the CPUSA). Olgin's called him a "teacher of Marxism-Leninism... an advance to which the contributions of Comrade Markoff are incalcuable."

In 1948, anti-Fluoride, anti-Communist, Christian Identity minister Kenneth Goff named Markoff:

These centers of instruction were organized by the late Abraham Markoff, national head of the Communist school system in the United States. He of course acted upon direct orders from Moscow. Every such school is a well of ideological poison from which young citizens drink atheistic and revolutionary ideas." in his book Confessions of Stalin's Agent.

(Goff was also 1944 national chairman of Gerald L. K. Smith's Christian Youth for America. In publishing this memoir in the 2010s, Christian Heritage Tours included a footnote that reads: "Editor’s Note: Shortly after Kenneth Goff published his book, Confessions of Stalin’s Agent in 1948, he was assassinated" – but Goff died in 1971.)

In 1951, Markoff's brother, Mr. Allan Markoff, and Mrs. Fanny Nadner Markoff, owners of the "Four Continent Book Corp." (importer) appeared before a Senate committee with their counsel Isadore G. Needleman. Allan Markoff admitted to membership in American Peace Mobilization, the International Workers Order (IWO), and National Council of American-Soviet Friendship. He also had a financial interest in the "People's Radio Foundation, Inc.," through whom he met Joseph R. Brodsky (head of the CPUSA's International Labor Defense).

== Works ==
Markoff was a frequent contributor to The Communist among other Communist publications.

Articles

- "Role of Party Training Schools in Developing Leadership," The Communist (July 1931)
- "The Training of New Cadres and Our School System," The Communist (August 1932)
- "Lenin on Agitation and Propaganda, and the Tasks of the Communist Party," The Communist (January 1934)
- "Marxist-Leninist Education in the U.S.A.," Inprecor (June 22, 1934)
- "Lenin – Thirteen Years After," The Communist (January 1937)

Booklets

- Famine in USSR (1933) (written by Alexander Prokofievich Markov, secretary of Cossack Union in France)
- "Fifteen Years of the Workers School," The Fifteen Anniversary Celebration Journal of the Workers School (1938)

== See also ==
- New York Workers School
- Jefferson School of Social Science
