= Marvin Gettleman =

American history professor

Marvin E. Gettleman (September 12, 1933 – January 7, 2017), was an American professor emeritus of leftist history, best known for the anthology Vietnam and America (1965).

== Background ==
Gettleman was born on September 12, 1933, in New York City. His parents were Arthur A. Gettleman and Pauline Antipol. In 1957, he graduated from the City College of New York and, in 1972, he earned a doctorate from the Johns Hopkins University.

== Career ==
Gettleman taught history at Brooklyn Polytechnic University from 1959 to 2005, after which he was professor emeritus of history. He was also a visiting professor of Queens College from 2000 to 2005, and of New York University in 2005.

In the 1980s, Gettleman worked with the New York Faculty Committee for Non-Intervention in Central America and the Caribbean.

From 1996 to 1998, Gettleman became executive director of the Abraham Lincoln Brigade Archives (ALBA).

In 2003, Gettleman helped found and served on the steering committee of Historians Against the War.

== Personal life and death ==
Gettleman was married three times, first to fellow CCNY classmate and civil rights activist Marge Nissen, with whom he had two sons, Daniel and Todd Gettleman.

He then married psychiatric social worker Susan Braiman, with whom he had two daughters, Eva Braiman and Rebecca Gettleman.

His third and final marriage was to Ellen Schrecker. Schrecker had two sons from her first marriage, Michael Schrecker and Dan Schrecker.

Gettleman died at home at age 83 on January 7, 2017, in New York City from dementia.

== Awards ==
- 1957-1959: Woodrow Wilson Foundation
- 1973-1974: Fellow, National Endowment of the Humanities

== Legacy ==
The Tamiment Library of New York University houses Gettleman's papers.

== Works ==
=== Books edited ===
- Vietnam: History, Documents, and Opinions on a Major World Crisis (1965])
- Great Society Reader: The Failure of American Liberalism (with David Mermelstein) (1967)
- Conflict in Indo-China: A Reader on the Widening War in Laos and Cambodia (with Susan Gettleman, Lawrence Kaplan, Carol Kaplan) (1970)
- El Salvador: Central America in the New Cold War (1981)
- Vietnam and America: A Documented History (1985)
- Middle East and Islamic World Reader with Stuart Schaar (2003)

=== Books written ===
- Dorr Rebellion: A Study in American Radicalism, 1833-1849 (1973)
- An Elusive Presence: The Discovery of John H. Finley and His America (1979)

=== Articles written ===
- "On Fall's Hell in a Very Small Place, A Frenchman's Viewpoint," Left and Right Journal (1967)
- "Assassination in Argentina," New York Review of Books (1972)
- "Workers School," Encyclopedia of the American Left (1990)
- "The New York Workers School, 1923-1944: Communist Education in American Society," New Studies in the Politics and Culture of U.S. Communism (1993)
- "Lost World of U.S. Labor Education: Curricula at East and West Coast Community Schools, 1944-1957" (2001)
- "No Varsity Teams": New York's Jefferson School of Social Science, 1943–1956," Science & Society (2005)
- "Communist Labor Pedagogy before McCarthyism" (2005)

== See also ==
- Dorr Rebellion
- New York Workers School
- Jefferson School of Social Science
- California Labor School
- Vietnam War
