= Louise Todd Lambert =

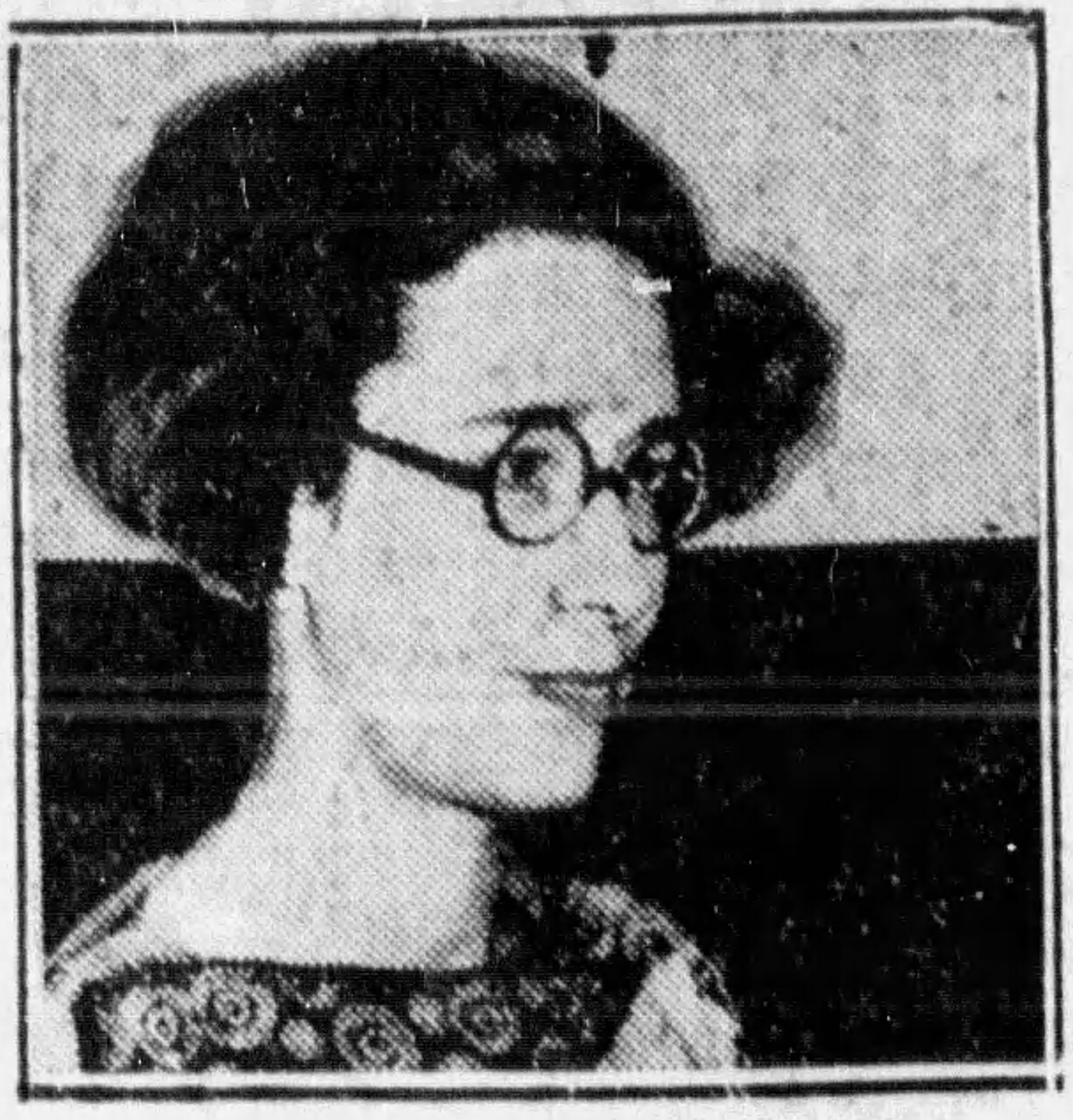
Lambert in 1935

Louise Todd Lambert (May 12, 1905 – June 4, 1991) was a Communist Party activist, organizer, and political candidate in California. She played a strong leadership role in the Communist Party, serving as state organizational secretary for California in the 1930s and 1940s. She was a member of a generation of women radicals in California remarkable for the significant leadership roles they played in the Communist Party.

== Early life ==
Louise Todd Lambert was born in 1905 in San Francisco, California, to Max Todd and Rosalie Dinslage, German immigrants and socialists. In her oral history, Lambert characterized her parents as free thinkers who encouraged lively discussion, debate, and exchange of ideas in the home. Her first experience with political persecution came in 1915, when her father, a San Francisco baker, was investigated for potential ties to the Preparedness Day Bombing. As a youth, Lambert was active in the women's suffrage movement, the Junior League of the Nature Friends, and the Young Workers League, a predecessor of the Young Communist League.

== Activism and imprisonment ==
In 1929, Lambert joined the Communist Party in California. She served as state organizational secretary until the mid-1940s. In this critical role, Lambert was "second in command of the state CP." Lambert was active in major strikes of the early 1930s, including the 1933 San Joaquin Valley Cotton Strike and the 1934 San Francisco General Strike. During the General Strike, she was arrested, along with Communist activist Ida Rothstein, on charges of vagrancy; both women were acquitted. Lambert also participated in local politics, running for the San Francisco Board of Supervisors in 1931 and 1933 as the official Communist Party candidate, and winning 10,815 votes in the 1933 election. In both elections, Lambert was the only woman candidate.

In 1934, Lambert was active in successful efforts to qualify the Communist Party to participate in state elections for the first time in California history. A slate of Party candidates entered the August primaries, with Anita Whitney winning enough votes to qualify as a candidate for the office of state controller. In 1934, Lambert was charged with perjury for allegedly making false affidavits on petitions to put the Communist Party on the state ballot, and arrested in Los Angeles, where she was serving as section organizer of the local Party. She was tried, convicted, and sentenced in February 1935 on three counts. At the time of her conviction, the San Francisco Chronicle referred to her as a "big shot," reporting that she was "an active factor in communist activities during the general strike and is a recognized radical leader." During sentencing, Superior Judge I. L. Harris defended the impartiality of the decision: "The defendant is being sent to prison not because she is a communist, but for a criminal offense which brought a jury conviction." Beginning in November 1935, Lambert served a thirteen-month sentence at the Tehachapi Correctional Institute for Women. Activists Caroline Decker Gladstein and Nora Conklin served sentences at Tehachapi at the same time.

Lambert was paroled on December 19, 1936, and resumed her work for the Communist Party in California, organizing training schools for leadership, serving as an instructor at the San Francisco Workers' School, participating in elections, supporting the Communist Party's newspaper, the People's World, and serving on the state executive committee. In 1939, she married her second husband, Communist Party member Rudie Lambert. Louise Lambert continued to work as organizational secretary until the mid-1940s, when the national Party was restructured. In 1947 or 1948, she was assigned a political action position as state legislative director of the Communist Party, and participated in efforts to put the Progressive Party on the California ballot.

== The underground period ==
Beginning in the late 1940s, intensifying anti-communist sentiment—and arrests of Communist Party leaders and members, including Rudie Lambert, under the Smith Act—created an atmosphere of fear within the Party. On June 4, 1951, the Supreme Court upheld the constitutionality of the Smith Act in the case of Dennis v. United States. The national Communist Party responded by implementing an underground organization and removing hundreds of the most committed activists, including Lambert, from public life. In her oral history, Lambert recalled that: "the analysis of the leadership was that McCarthyism, compounded by this decision of the Supreme Court, represented the eleventh hour before fascism in the United States." In 1950, Lambert was selected to serve in the Communist Party's underground reserve leadership. According to her oral history, she was the only woman in the group. For the next five years, she lived under an alias on the East Coast, separated from her husband and family. Lambert returned to California in 1955. In response to internal party politics and international events, including the Soviet invasion of Hungary and the Khrushchev report, she resigned from the Communist Party in 1958, signing a joint letter of protest with other prominent members.
