= Big Red Songbook =

The Big Red Songbook is a collection of Wobbly songs compiled by folklorist Archie Green. The 2016 edition was co-edited by Green, labor historian David Roediger, Franklin Rosemont, and Salvatore Solerno. It features an introduction by Tom Morello, and an afterword by Utah Phillips. It is dedicated to Jenny Lahti Velsek, an IWW figure who died in 2006; the frontispiece is a 1930s photograph of Velsek with her accordion.
