= Tie Vapauteen =

Finnish-language magazine

Although an official publication of the Industrial Workers of the World only from February 1921 through March 1929, Tie Vapauteen was an enthusiastic supporter of the IWW for its entire 19-year existence.

Tie Vapauteen (Finnish for "Road to Freedom") was a Finnish language monthly magazine published by Finnish members of the Industrial Workers of the World (IWW) in the United States from 1919 to 1937. The magazine advanced an explicitly syndicalist position marked by Marxian class analysis. The magazine featured regular analysis of American industry, working life, and political commentary alongside poetry, fiction, and humor. The publication was also closely tied to the Finnish Work People's College in Duluth, Minnesota, and would occasionally publish contributions written by Work Peoples' College students.

== Publication history ==
=== Establishment ===
Tie Vapauteen (Road to Freedom) first appeared in June 1919 as the publication of an entity called "Finnish IWW Supporters of the Eastern States," under the supervision of the governing General Executive Board of the Industrial Workers of the World. The magazine was published in New York City under the editorship of the Finnish immigrant Topias Kekkonen. The publication achieved a peak circulation of between 5,000 and 6,000 copies during this interval.

=== Move to Chicago ===
Beginning in February 1921, publication of Tie Vapauteen moved from New York to Chicago and the magazine was brought into the stable of periodicals produced by the IWW's official Publishing Bureau, operated through organizational headquarters. According to a report by business manager Rosa Knuuti to the 13th Convention of the IWW in June 1921, the move to Chicago was made in an effort to ameliorate editorial controversy between supporters of the Communist International and opponents of political action — a bitter dispute which had caused the magazine's circulation to plummet to about 3,500, thereby threatening its existence.

This bold shift of venue and increased attention to moderating the extremes of political opinion seems to have paid dividends, as within four months the publication's circulation had successfully rebounded to the 6,500 copy mark. By the end of 1924, a circulation of 8,000 copies per issue would be claimed.

Tie Vapauteen would remain an official organ of the IWW through March 1929.

=== Transfer to Duluth ===
In April 1929, Tie Vapauteen was transferred to a third publishing entity, the Workers' Socialist Publishing Company (WSPC) of Duluth, Minnesota. This radical Finnish publishing group had emerged from the syndicalist left wing of the old Finnish Socialist Federation and had for more than a decade published the pro-IWW newspaper Industrialisti (The Industrialist). The WSPC also was closely connected with Work People's College, located in the Smithville suburb of Duluth.

Tie Vapauteen was rebranded as an "industrialist scientific-literary monthly" under the WSPC's supervision. Issues were profusely illustrated with photographs and cartoon art, and included poetry and fiction in addition to the expected hard-hitting political fare. Issues typically ran 32 pages in length.

Each spring the students of Work People's College would edit a special annual called Työväen Opiston Kevätjulkaisu (The Spring Publication of Work People's College) as a special number of Tie Vapauteen.

A total of 19 volumes of Tie Vaupauteen were produced in all, with the publication terminating publication in August 1937.

=== Contributors ===
A number of prominent figures of the Finnish left wing movement made editorial contributions to Tie Vapauteen. Included among these were Kalle Rissanen, Yrjö Sirola, and William Tanner, among others.
