= Ellen Schrecker =

American historian

- Born: August 4, 1938 (age 87); Philadelphia, Pennsylvania, U.S.
- Employer: Stern College for Women
- Title: Professor
- Spouse(s): John E. Schrecker, Feb. 18, 1962 (div. Mar. 1979); Marvin E. Gettleman, Aug. 28, 1981 - January 7, 2017)
- Children: Michael Franz; Daniel Edwin
- Parent(s): Edwin II and Margaret Dannenbaum Wolf
- Awards: Bunting Inst Fel, 77-78; Res Fel, Harry S. Truman Libr, 87; Outstanding Book Awd, Hist of Educ Soc, 87; Fel Nat Humanities Center, 94-95; Outstanding Acad Book "Choice", 98.
- Website: Yeshiva University: Faculty web page

Ellen Wolf Schrecker (born August 4, 1938) is an American professor emerita of American history at Yeshiva University. She has received the Frederick Ewen Academic Freedom Fellowship at the Tamiment Library at New York University. She is known primarily for her work in the history of McCarthyism. Historian Ronald Radosh has described her as "the dean of the anti-anti-Communist historians."

== Background ==
Schrecker graduated magna cum laude from Radcliffe College in 1960 and earned her M.A. in 1962 and her doctorate in 1974, both from Harvard University.

== Career ==
She has taught at Harvard, Princeton, New York University, the New School for Social Research, and Columbia. From 1998 to 2002, Schrecker was the editor of Academe, the journal of the American Association of University Professors.

== Personal life ==
Schrecker married Marvin Gettleman (1933 – 2017), a professor emeritus of history.

== Political views ==
Schrecker has said that she is "a card-carrying member of the American Civil Liberties Union (ACLU) who undertook the study of McCarthyism precisely because of my opposition to its depredations against freedom of speech," and that "in this country[,] McCarthyism did more damage to the constitution than the American Communist party ever did." In a reply to an essay that Schrecker and Maurice Isserman wrote in The Nation in 2000, John Earl Haynes quoted the leader of the Union for Democratic Action (UDA), the predecessor of the politically progressive Americans for Democratic Action (ADA), who stated that "an alliance between liberals and Communists [would] betray liberalism's bedrock democratic values." Haynes cited as evidence of Schrecker's illiberalism her statement that "cold war liberalism did not, in fact, 'get it right.'" Schrecker has been criticized by Trotskyists for being excessively concerned for the reputations of persons connected with the Stalin-supporting Communist Party USA, noting that the CPUSA supported the US government's prosecution of Trotskyists under the Smith Act and, in general, persecuted socialists who did not support Stalin's regime.

Schrecker has written critically of David Horowitz's "academic bill of rights" manifesto against what he considers a predominant liberal bias in American higher education. She concurred with the ACLU and Amnesty International, the Center for Constitutional Rights, and the American Association of University Professors in condemning the University of South Florida's 2003 dismissal of a tenured faculty member: the Palestinian-born, professor of computer engineering Sami Al-Arian, following his federal indictment during the Bush presidency on charges of raising money for terrorism through his support for Palestinian causes. Schrecker wrote:

Just as charges of communist sympathies in the 1950s destroyed the careers of people who studied China, so today the Arab-Israeli conflict plagues scholars who come from or study the Middle East. Predictably, the first major academic-freedom case to arise after September 11 involved a Palestinian nationalist, the already-controversial University of South Florida professor of computer engineering Sami Al-Arian, suspended and then fired after the federal government charged him with supporting terrorism. His summary dismissal, even if the university were to revisit it in light of his recent acquittal, is a classic violation of academic freedom: It involved his off-campus political activities.

== Bibliography ==
Schrecker's best known book is Many Are the Crimes: McCarthyism in America (1998), about which Kirkus Reviews wrote, "It is no easy task bringing new life to an era already as dissected as the McCarthy era, yet this is what Schrecker accomplishes in a magnificent study of how and why McCarthyism happened and how its shadow still darkens our lives." In addition, she has written on political repression, academic freedom, Soviet espionage during the Cold War, Franco-American relations in the 1920s ( subject of her PhD dissertation), and Chinese cuisine.

=== Books ===
- Chiang, Jung-feng; Schrecker, Ellen W.; Schrecker, John E. (1976) [2nd edition 1987]. Mrs. Chiang's Szechwan Cookbook: Szechwan Home Cooking. New York: Harper and Row. ISBN 0-06-015828-X.
- Schrecker, Ellen (1978). Hired Money: The French Debt to the United States, 1917-1929. Arno Press. ISBN 0-405-11247-5.
- Schrecker, Ellen (1983). Kaplan, Craig (ed.). Regulating the Intellectuals: Perspectives on Academic Freedom in the 1980s. Praeger Publishers. ISBN 0-275-91021-0.
- Schrecker, Ellen (1986). No Ivory Tower: McCarthyism and the Universities. Oxford University Press. ISBN 0-19-505663-9.
- Schrecker, Ellen (1998). Many Are the Crimes: McCarthyism in America. Little, Brown and Company. ISBN 0-316-77470-7.
- Schrecker, Ellen (2002). The Age of McCarthyism: A Brief History with Documents, Second Edition. Bedford / St. Martin's. ISBN 0-312-39319-9.
- Schrecker, Ellen (2003). American Inquisition: The Era of McCarthyism (compact disc). Prince Frederick, MD: Recorded Books, LLC. ISBN 978-1-4025-4758-4.
- Schrecker, Ellen (2004). Cold War Triumphalism: Exposing the Misuse of History after the Fall of Communism (Editor). New York: The New Press. ISBN 1-59558-083-2.
- Schrecker, Ellen (2010). The Lost Soul of Higher Education: Corporatization, the Assault on Academic Freedom, and the End of the American University. New York: The New Press. ISBN 978-1-5955-8400-7.
- Schrecker, Ellen (2025). The Lost Promise: American Universities in the 1960s. University of Chicago Press. ISBN 978-0-2268-3676-8.

=== Articles, chapters ===
- "Archival Sources for the Study of McCarthyism," Journal of American History, June 1988
- "Introduction" to Records of the Subversive Activities Control Board, 1950‑1972, University Publications of America, Frederick, MD, 1989
- "McCarthyism and the Labor Movement: The Role of the State," in Steve Rosswurm, ed., The CIO's Left‑Led Unions, Rutgers University Press, New Brunswick, NJ, 1992
- "McCarthyism and the Communist Party," in Michael Brown et al. eds., New Studies in the Politics and Culture of U.S. Communism, Monthly Review Press, New York, 1993; reprinted in Andre Kaenel, ed., Anti-Communism and McCarthyism in the United States, Editions Messene, Paris, 1995
- "Before the Rosenbergs: Espionage Scenarios in the Early Cold War" in Marjorie Garber and Rebecca Walkowitz, ed., Secret Agents: The Rosenberg Case and the McCarthy Era, Routledge, 1995
- "Immigration and Internal Security: Political Deportations during the McCarthy Era," Science & Society 60 (4) Winter 1996-1997
- "Will Technology Make Academic Freedom Obsolete?" in Will Teach for Food: Academic Labor in Crisis, Cary Nelson, ed. University of Minnesota Press, 1997
- "The Spies Who Loved Us," The Nation, May 24, 1999
- "McCarthy's Ghosts: Anticommunism and American Labor," New Labor Forum, Spring/Summer, 1999
- "Left, Right, and Labor," Working USA, Jan-Feb 2000
- with Maurice Isserman, "The Right's Cold War Revisionism," The Nation, July 24/31, 2000
- David McCann; Barry Strauss, eds. (2001). ""McCarthyism and Democracy". War and Democracy: The Peloponnesian War and the Korean War. Armonk: M.E. Sharpe. ISBN 978-0-7656-0694-5.
- "Free Speech on Campus: Academic Freedom and the Corporations," in Thomas R. Hensley, ed., The Boundaries of Freedom of Expression and Order in American Democracy, Kent State University Press, Spring 2001
- Schrecker, Ellen (2002). "McCarthyism and the Red Scare". In Roy Rosenzweig; Jean-Christophe Agnew (eds.). Companion to Post-1945 America, Blackwell. Malden, MA: Blackwell. ISBN 0-631-22325-8.
- "Soviet Espionage on American TV: The VENONA Story," Diplomatic History, Vol 27, no. 2 (Spring 2003), 279–82.
- Schrecker, Ellen (2004), "Labor and the Cold War: The Legacy of McCarthyism", in Robert Cherny; William Issel; Kieran Walsh Taylor (eds.), Labor and the Cold War at the Grassroots, Rutgers University Press, ISBN 0-8135-3402-X
- Schrecker, Ellen (2004), "A Very Dangerous Course: Harry S. Truman and the Red Scare", in Richard S. Kirkendall (ed.), Harry's Farewell: Commentaries on the Historical Significance of the Truman Presidency, Columbia, Missouri: University of Missouri Press, ISBN 0-8262-1552-1
- "Communism and Soviet Espionage in the 1940s," North Carolina Law Review, vol 82, #5, June 2004
- "Stealing Secrets: Communism and Soviet Espionage in the 1940s, " North Carolina Law Review vol 82, #5 (June 2004): 101–47.
- "McCarthyism: Political Repression and the Fear of Communism," Social Research Vol. 71, No 3, Fall 2004
- Schrecker, Ellen (2010), "McCarthyism: The Myth and the Reality", in Douglas Brinkley; Sam Tanenhaus (eds.), McCarthyism in America, Yale University Press, ISBN 978-0-300-11165-1
- "'Papers of a Dangerous Tendency': From Major Andre's Boot to the Venona Files," in Schrecker, ed., Cold War Triumphalism, with Maurice Isserman
- Book and film reviews in American Historical Review, Diplomatic History, History of Education Quarterly, Isis, Journal of American History, Labor History, Labour/Le Travail, Monthly Review, The Nation, Pacific Historical Review, Political Science Quarterly, Science and Society, Women's Review of Books, Journal of Cold War Studies, H-Net
