= Four Continent Book Corporation =

Former bookstore in New York

Four Continent Book Corporation was a New York bookstore specializing in Russian-language materials.

== History ==
The store originated as the Bookniga Corporation, at 255 Fifth Avenue, and later moved to 199 Fifth Avenue. The business was founded in 1935 to sell Soviet books in the United States. In 1939, three booksellers from the Bookniga Corporation, Raphael Rush, Norman Weinberg, and Morris Liskin, were prosecuted under the Foreign Agents Registration Act for failing to register as agents of the Soviet company Mezhdunarodnaya Kniga. They were accused of selling materials "of a political and propagandist nature, and for political and propaganda purposes" By 1941, Bookniga had changed its name to the Four Continent Book Corporation, though it retained its same staff and building. The store's first president, B. Nikolsky, was replaced by Cyril J. Lamkin, who later moved to Moscow. Allan Markoff, brother of Abraham Markoff became the store's president in 1948.

The business' final president was Eda I. Glaser, a former employee at the United Nations. In May 1953, Glaser was fired from her $4,000 a year library clerk job by Dag Hammarskjöld, after she refused to answer questions about her political beliefs posed by loyalty investigators. Glaser's case, one of eleven fired UN employees, was appealed to the UN Administrative Tribunal who ordered that she receive compensation for her termination but Hammarskjöld refused to reinstate the former employees.

In 1955, the store was one of four businesses targeted by the FBI in an investigation of Soviet propaganda in the United States. The store's owners stated that the value of books they imported between 1946 and 1960 was one million dollars. The bookstore was bombed multiple times because of its politics and association with the Soviet Union. In 1976, a pipe bomb exploded in the store, placed by the Jewish Armed Resistance Strike Unit in retaliation for the Soviet Union's treatment of its Jewish population. The store was also the target of another small bomb attack in 1981, which was attributed to a member of the Jewish Defense League who demanded the release of Natan Sharansky.

As president, Glaser specialized in early Soviet imprints. She and the store were the subject of negative news stories in 1979, when employees at Four Continent went on strike. Press coverage of the strike attempted to portray Glaser as hypocritical for being unable to support the store's workers while selling Marxist literature. Glaser retired from Four Continent and worked as a volunteer for the New York Public Library. Another strike was held in 1983, after the store dismissed its 20 employees and decided to operate through the mail. That same year, the business was purchased by the Viktor Kamkin Bookstore. Kamkin operated the store until 2000, when he closed the New York location.
