= San Francisco Workers' School =

1930s educational facility run by the Communist Party

- Successor: California Labor School
- Formation: 1934
- Dissolved: circa 1942
- Purpose: educational, propagandist, indoctrinal
- Headquarters: 121 Haight Street, San Francisco
- Services: ideological training center of CPUSA, adult education
- Key people: Anita Whitney, Samuel Adams Darcy, Langston Hughes, Lincoln Steffens, Ella Winter
- Affiliations: Communist Party USA

The San Francisco Workers' School was an ideological training center of the Communist Party USA (CPUSA). Founded in San Francisco in 1934, it offered evening classes in Marxism and labor organizing. Like other Communist schools that sprouted up around the U.S. in the Great Depression, it became a target of government investigation during the Second Red Scare.

== History ==
In 1934, Anita Whitney, Samuel Adams Darcy, Benjamin Ellisberg, Lincoln Steffens, and Steffens' wife Ella Winter co-founded the San Francisco Workers' School (SFWS). It was housed in the CPUSA headquarters at 121 Haight Street in central San Francisco. The school's forerunner in the city had been the Jack London Memorial Institute (later renamed the People's Institute), established in 1917 as a worker education center, library, and meeting hall.

Here is how the SFWS was advertised in a May 1936 edition of the West Coast Communist newspaper, Western Worker:

The San Francisco Workers' School, Room 3, 121 Haight street, offers a wide variety of courses in Marxism-Leninism, current events, trade union problems—economics, history, etc. Just exactly what can you accomplish by attending the school? You can gain a scientific knowledge of the social forces operating in the world which will enable you to evaluate the past, understand the present, and look into the future.

The SFWS only remained in existence for eight years. In 1942 it was transformed into the Tom Mooney Labor School, and two years later became the California Labor School (CLS). Despite its brief tenure, the SFWS was a target of investigation during the McCarthy era when state and federal authorities sought to uncover evidence of Communist subversion and un-American propaganda in the U.S. In the late 1940s, the California Senate Factfinding Subcommittee on Un-American Activities, led by State Senator Jack Tenney, reported that the SFWS was "openly a school for instruction in Communism". After the passage of the 1950 McCarran Internal Security Act, the Subversive Activities Control Board probed the SFWS and its "Phoenix-like characteristics" to reemerge as the Tom Mooney School and CLS. In 1953 the former teachers and administrators at the SFWS were subject to scrutiny in hearings before the House Un-American Activities Committee (HUAC).

== Organization ==
=== Executive Committee ===
- James Branch, director
- Esther Goodman, secretary
- J. W. Weeks, publicity manager
- Nell Higman, librarian

=== Advisory Council ===
The 1947 Tenney Committee report said that the school's Advisory Council included Langston Hughes, Lincoln Steffens, and Anita Whitney. At an HUAC hearing in 1953, a school pamphlet from 1934 was produced as an exhibit. It provided a more complete list of the Advisory Council:

- Langston Hughes (writer)
- Ella Winter (journalist)
- Lincoln Steffens (journalist and husband of Ella Winter)
- George Morris (editor, Western Worker)
- Sam Darcy (CPUSA district organizer)
- Beatrice Kinkead
- Anita Whitney
- Dr. M. H. Crawford
- Benjamin Ellisberg (Ornamental Plasterers' Union - AFL)
- Sam Diner (Needle Trades Workers' Industrial Union - NTWIU )
- Harry Jackson (Marine Workers' Industrial Union - MWIU)
- Neil Hickey (Trade Union Unity League - TUUL)
- Leo Gallagher (labor lawyer)

=== Courses ===
Except for a few day sessions tailored for night-shift workers, "classes were held in the evenings, after regular working hours." A typical course consisted of twelve sessions spread over three months. Course tuition was one dollar for employed workers, and 50 cents for the unemployed.

The curriculum emphasized the principles of Marxism and labor organizing. However, it also offered English and Russian courses (as the Jack London Memorial Institute had done), and classes in practical skills and the creative arts:

- Principles of Communism
- Principles of Communism for Young Workers
- Marxian Economics
- Leninism
- History of the American Labor Movement
- History of the Three Internationals
- History of the Russian Revolution
- National and Colonial Problems
- Trade Union Strategy and Tactics
- Principles of Working Class Organization (only for CPUSA and YCL members)
- Agitation and Propaganda Technique
- Self-Defense in Courts (four sessions)
- Revolutionary Journalism
- Revolutionary Theater
- Still Photography
- Cinematography
- Art theory

=== Teachers ===
- Elaine Black
- George Morris
- Karl Hama (alias for Goso Yoneda)
- Kenneth Rexroth
- Lester Balog
- Louise Todd
- Sam Darcy

=== Publications ===
The school published a journal called Writers' Workshop, edited by activist, novelist, and historian Alexander Saxton.

== See also ==
- Rand School of Social Science (1906)
- Work People's College (1907)
- Brookwood Labor College (1921)
- New York Workers School (1923)
  - New Workers School (1929)
  - Jefferson School of Social Science (1944)
- Highlander Research and Education Center (formerly Highlander Folk School) (1932)
  - Commonwealth College (Arkansas) (1923-1940)
  - Southern Appalachian Labor School (since 1977)
- California Labor School (formerly Tom Mooney Labor School) (1942)
- Seattle Labor School (1946–1949)
- Los Angeles People's Education Center
