= Victor Kamkin Bookstore =

Former bookstore in Rockville, Maryland, United States

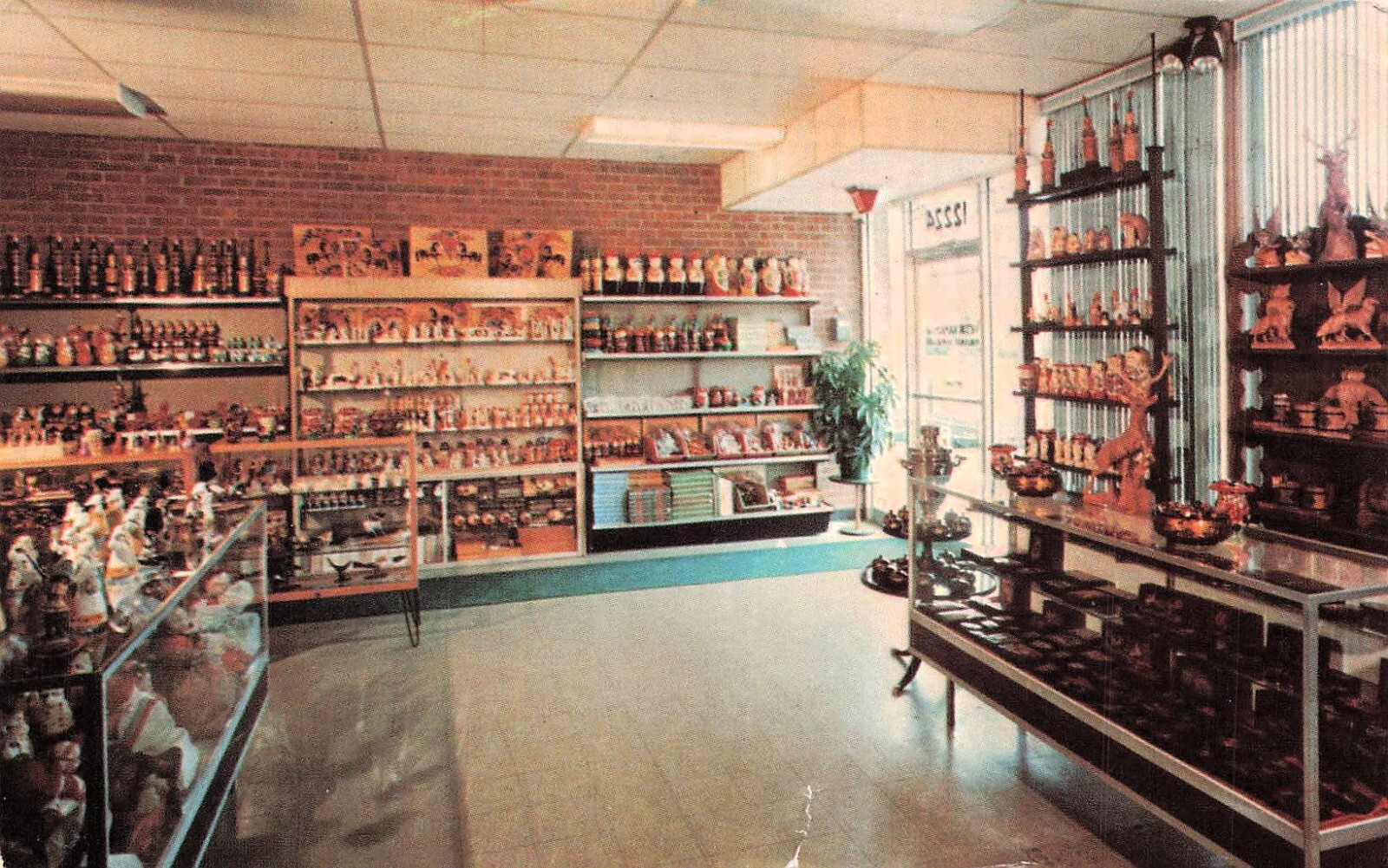
Interior of the Victor Kamkin Bookstore around 1973

The Victor Kamkin Bookstore was a retail book shop with a main location in Rockville, Maryland and a smaller store in New York City in the United States. Established in 1953 by Victor Kamkin and his wife Elena Kamkina, the store maintained continuous operation throughout the Cold War era, specializing in material published in the Soviet Union.

== Company history ==
=== Establishment ===
The Victor Kamkin Bookstore was founded in 1953 by Viktor Petrovich Kamkin (1902–1974), a St. Petersburg-born son of an ethnic Russian financier, and his wife, Elena Andreevna Kamkina.

As a young man Victor Kamkin was a volunteer in the White Army headed by Admiral Alexander Kolchak in the Russian Civil War and was forced into emigration to Harbin, China in 1923 with the remnants of Kolchak's defeated forces. In Harbin Kamkin resumed his education, graduating from a Russian law school in 1928.

Kamkin moved to Shanghai in 1929 where he entered the book publishing business as a partner in the firm V.P. Kamkin and A.P. Malyk, eventually publishing some 26 titles. In May 1937 Kamkin relocated to the northern Chinese city of Tianjin, where he established a Russian-language bookstore called "Znanie" (Knowledge). During the years of World War II Kamkin, still in Tianjin, worked as an assistant manager in an Italian-American publishing firm called "Chili Press."

Kamkin's publishing experience in China led him to work as a translator and technical assistant on the staff of the American military newspaper North China Marine, which was published in Tianjin. He moved with this publication to the eastern Chinese city of Qingdao in 1948 before successfully emigrating to the United States in 1952, settling in the Washington, DC metropolitan area.

In America, Kamkin returned to the world of book publishing and sales, first opening his bookstore specializing in Russian-language publications in 1953. In a field largely devoid of competition, Kamkin managed to gain a lucrative exclusivity agreement with the Soviet government for the importation of books and periodicals from the USSR. The Victor Kamkin Bookstore was thus established as the primary source in the United States for Russian literature and political and economic titles of interest to scholars of Russian history and the contemporary Soviet Union.

=== Development ===
Kamkin's operation was expanded to include a second store, located at 149 Fifth Avenue in Manhattan. In 1983, Kamkin purchased the Four Continent Book Corporation from Eda Glaser, one of the largest suppliers of Russian books in New York City. By 1990 this New York City location included an inventory of approximately 1 million books, periodicals, vinyl records, and maps.

=== Termination ===
In 2002 flagging sales, increased competition, and escalating costs foreshadowed a forced end to the operation. With some two million unsold volumes remaining in inventory, the store became the object of widespread media coverage, and thousands of customers flooded the store. Some 60,000 volumes were additionally saved from incineration through the prompt action of Congressional Representative Connie Morella and Librarian of Congress James H. Billington. The reprieve proved to be short-lived, however, and although some more marketable titles made their way to the inventories of other retailers of Russian-language books, hundreds of thousands of volumes were ultimately destroyed at the time of the store's forced liquidation in 2006.

== See also ==
- List of independent bookstores in the United States
- Russian literature
