= Jenny Lahti Velsek =

American labor activist (1913-2006)

- Jenny Velsek in the 1930s
- Born: March 4, 1913; Eagle River, Wisconsin, U.S.
- Died: April 18, 2006 (aged 93); Tucson, Arizona, U.S.
- Other name: Jennie Velsek
- Occupation: Labor organizer

Jenny Lahti Velsek (March 4, 1913 – April 18, 2006) was an American activist involved most of her life with the Industrial Workers of the World.

== Biography ==
Lahti was born in Eagle River, Wisconsin, one of the five daughters of Herman Lahti and Liisa Ranta Lahti. Her parents were immigrants from Finland. She attended Tyovaen Opisto, a Finnish-language school for labor activists in Minnesota, sponsored by the Industrial Workers of the World (IWW).

Lahti was involved in IWW activities in Chicago for much of her life, and preserved Finnish-language workers' songs, and photographs from IWW events. She played the accordion. Velsek and her husband were arrested for vagrancy and convicted after the 1933 Yakima Valley strike, but she avoided jail time by agreeing to leave the state.

Lahti married Charles Velsek. Her husband died in 1979, her companion Fred Thompson died in 1987, and she died in 2006, at the age of 93, in Tucson, Arizona.

The 2016 edition of the Big Red Songbook is dedicated to Velsek, and the frontispiece is a photograph of Velsek with her accordion. The Charles and Jennie Velsek Papers are at the Walter P. Reuther Library at Wayne State University. There is a folder of her papers in the Fred Thompson Papers at the Newberry Library. There is also a folder of her papers in the Immigration History Research Center Archives at the University of Minnesota.
