= Work People's College =

Coordinates: 46.7024°N 92.2088°W

- Työväen Opisto (Finnish)
- Work People's College as it appeared in 1913. Note the parallel American and red flags flying over the building.
- Smithville, Minnesota; United States

Information
- Type: Labor college
- Opened: 1907
- Closed: 1941

Work People's College (Finnish: Työväen Opisto) was a radical labor college (a type of a folk high school governed by the worker's movement) established in Smithville, then a suburb of Duluth, Minnesota, in 1907 by the Finnish Socialist Federation of the Socialist Party of America. School administrators and faculty were sympathetic to the syndicalist left wing of the Finnish labor movement and the institution came into the orbit of the Industrial Workers of the World during the 1914-1915 factional battle that split the Finnish Federation. The school ceased operation in 1941.

In 2012 the Twin Cities branch of the Industrial Workers of the World relaunched Work People's College on a limited basis as a summer training camp for the group's activists and organizers.

== Institutional history ==
=== Forerunner ===
Work People's College Class of 1913.

Finnish immigrants to the United States during the first years of the 20th Century tended to be a literate community, with 97% of those arriving between 1899 and 1907 knowing how to read and write. Education was a valued part of Finnish immigrant life and the desire for institutions of higher learning in their own language extended across generational and ideological boundaries. As early as 1900 there were discussions about establishing a school that would provide a liberal alternative to Suomi College and Seminary of Hancock, Michigan.

Work People's College was preceded by a "folk" high school of the Finnish Evangelical Lutheran Church of America that was founded in Minneapolis in September 1903. The school was launched with a view to teaching the Finnish language and Lutheran religion to its students. Finnish immigrants in this period constituted nearly 40 percent of the population of Northern Minnesota, with a goodly number of these working in the mining and timber industries or on the docks of Duluth, a major port on the southernmost tip of Lake Superior.

The Finnish Lutheran high school moved to Smithville, a rural area just southwest of Duluth, a few months after its establishment. It changed its name to the Finnish People's College and Theological Seminary in January 1904, a name change which reflected the institution's desire to serve both general educational and seminarian needs of the community. Money was raised to fund the school's purchase of a three-story building through the sale of shares of stock. A board of directors controlled the operations of the institution, which included both anti-socialist clerics and pro-socialist lay members of the church. In an intense economic and political environment, marked by labor strikes and the emergence of the Finnish Socialist Federation among the immigrant community, these factions vied for control of the school.

The students of the Finnish People's College and Theological Seminary resisted the school's educational regime, which imposed mandatory prayer while forbidding discussion of social issues. This led to a strike of the student body in the Fall of 1904, with all but two students walking out of a mandatory prayer meeting in protest. The director of the school, E.W. Saranen, subsequently resigned his post as a result of the students' action.

=== Establishment ===
With enrollment tailing off, the board of directors initially considered closing the school but found financial rescue through the sale of stock in the institution at the rate of $1.00 per share. Frustrated by the lack of advanced secular education in their own language, the Finnish Socialist Federation (FSF) became actively involved buying stock at the behest of board member Alex Halonen. By the fall of 1907 majority control of the stock of the Finnish People's College was firmly ensconced in Socialist hands. The Socialists then made use of their majority ownership to assert control over the composition of the school's board of directors.

As a reflection of the institution's shift to secular labor education a new name was chosen for the institution — Työväen Opisto (Workers' College), most commonly albeit clumsily rendered into English as Work People's College. K.L. Haataja served as director and instructor. Leo Laukki assumed leadership in 1908. The new labor school was launched with just 8 students during the initial year, with the student body growing in the 1910-11 academic year at over 100 students. The class of 1912-13 was 136 students, of whom 33 were women. To this was added another group of students who participated in coursework through postal correspondence.

The Finnish Socialist Federation agreed to take on Work People's College as its own institution at the group's 1908 convention. For the next several years every member of the Federation paid an additional tax of $1.00 per year for support of the school in addition to their regular payment of monthly dues. The 1912 convention of the FSF voted to reduce this subsidy to 50 cents per member per year, at the same time adding its opinion that the school's curriculum should be tailored to the needs of future socialist and trade union activists rather than to a general course of study. The school also charged a tuition of its students, which included room and board. Students in the 1912-13 academic year paid $20 per month for tuition, room, and board, an amount which was hiked to $22 for the 1913-14 term of study.

Work People's College taught its students a mandatory preparatory program including economics, politics, history, and "socialist program and tactics." Students could then continue with more specialized coursework, including courses in bookkeeping, basic mathematics, and the Finnish and English languages. Others continued on the academic path to become socialist orators and party functionaries, studying Marxist theoretical works in English and Finnish.

A severe ideological split divided the Finnish Socialist movement during the middle years of the 1910s, with one part of the FSF staying with the Socialist Party of America and another more radical offshoot casting its lot with the syndicalist Industrial Workers of the World. Work People's College was retained by the latter faction.

Work People's College was a resident labor college, housing its students on-site. Other similar schools included Brookwood Labor College at Katonah, New York and Commonwealth College of Mena, Arkansas.

=== Termination ===
There were roughly 30 students during the final year of operation in 1940-41.

One building of the former Work People's College still stands at 402 S. 88th Ave. West in Duluth and houses ten apartments.

=== Legacy ===
Beginning in the summer of 2012, the Twin Cities General Membership Branch of the Industrial Workers of the World in partnership with IWWs from around the country restarted the Work People's College, hosting a 5-day retreat bringing together nearly 100 rank and file organizers from around North America.

== Notable faculty and alumni ==
- Leo Laukki
- Amelia Milka Sablich
- Yrjö Sirola
- Fred Thompson
- Jenny Lahti Velsek
- August Wesley
- Niilo Wälläri

== See also ==
- Highlander Folk School
- Tie Vapauteen
- Rand School of Social Science (1906)
- Work People's College (1907)
- Brookwood Labor College (1921)* New York Workers School (1923):
  - New Workers School (1929)
  - Jefferson School of Social Science (1944)
- Highlander Research and Education Center (formerly Highlander Folk School) (1932)
  - Commonwealth College (Arkansas) (1923-1940)
  - Southern Appalachian Labor School (since 1977)
- San Francisco Workers' School (1934)
  - California Labor School (formerly Tom Mooney Labor School) (1942)
- Continuing education
- Los Angeles People's Education Center
