= Leonard Mins =

American spy (1900–1988)

Leonard Emil Mins (1900–1988) was an American who worked in the Russian Section of the Research and Analysis Division of the Office of Strategic Services (OSS) during World War II. Mins also worked for Soviet Military Intelligence (GRU).

Mins joined the Communist Party of the United States (CPUSA) in 1919 and worked for the Communist movement in Germany in 1920 and 1921. In 1924 and 1925 Mins worked for the Executive Committee of the Comintern as a translator. From 1927 to 1932 Mins did Communist Party work in the United States. In 1934 he transferred his party membership to the Communist Party of the Soviet Union (CPSU).

Mins was in France in 1938 working with exiled German writers, one of whom was the father of the later notorious East German spymaster and Stasi officer Markus Wolf. In his 1997 memoirs Wolf recalled his old friend as, "a Communist exile who had been my parents' close friend" in Russia. "He had been the channel through which my father was able to communicate with us during his internment in France."

Mins worked for the OSS from 1942 to late 1943, and worked mostly on a survey of strategic minerals and oil reserves in Asia and the Soviet Union. Mins was the subject of a Dies Committee investigation in 1943. Mins denied being a member of the Communist Party of the United States (CPUSA) but admitted he taught at the Workers School, a Communist controlled entity, and served on the editorial board of Partisan Review, had been a member of the John Reed Club, written for the New Masses, and a member of the League of American Writers. Mins admitted he had lived in Moscow from 1934 to 1936 but insisted he only made translations for the Soviet Academy of Sciences.

== Venona ==
Leonard Mins cover name in Soviet Military Intelligence, and as deciphered in the Venona project, is "Smith". Mins is referenced in the following Venona project decrypts:

- 1131 GRU New York to Moscow, 12 July 1943
- 1348 GRU New York to Moscow, 16 August 1943
- 1350 GRU New York to Moscow, 17 August 1943
- 1373 GRU New York to Moscow, 23 August 1943
- 1456 GRU New York to Moscow, 8 September 1943
