= Anita Whitney =

American political activist (1867–1955)

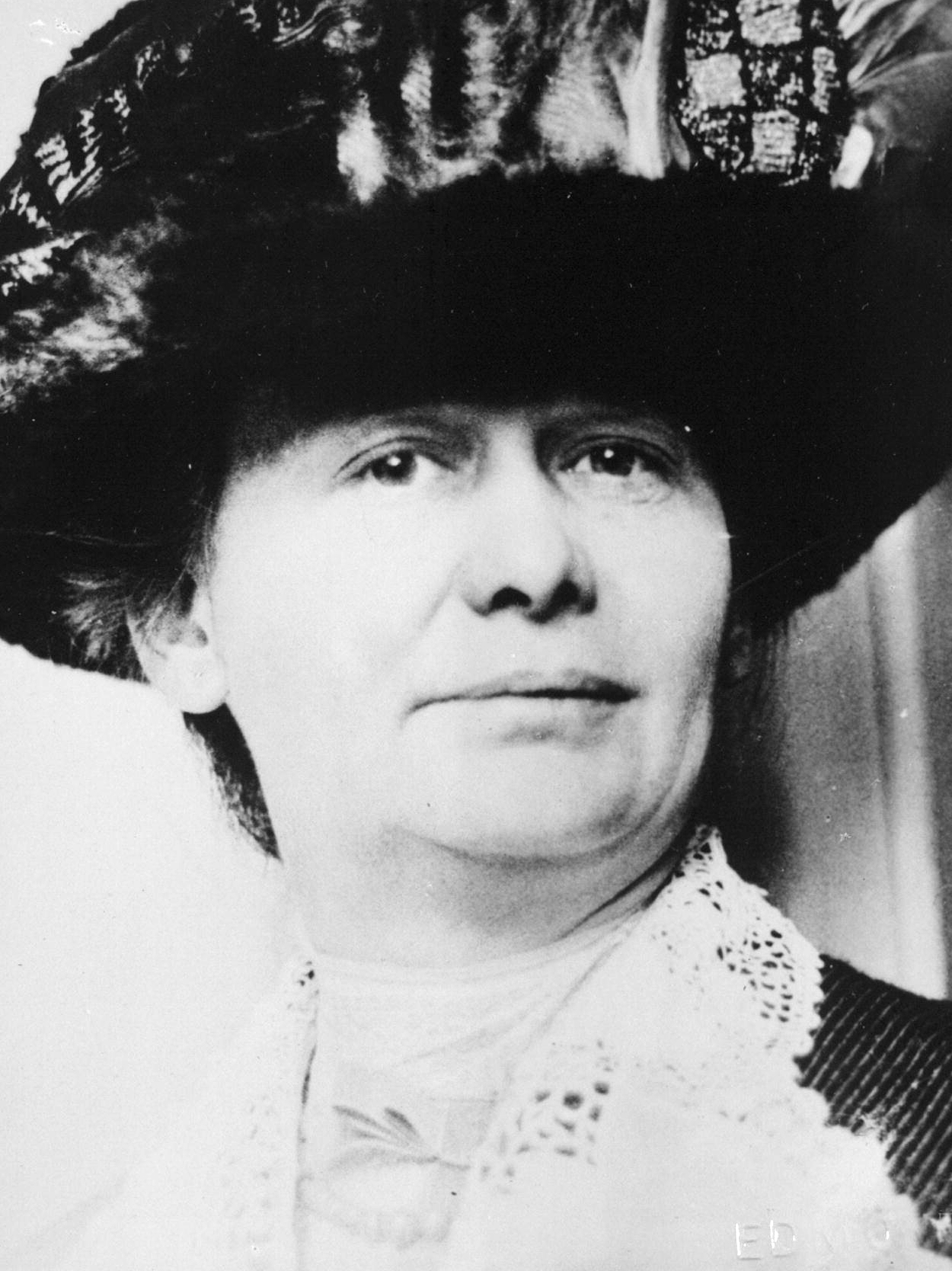
- Whitney c. 1910s
- Born: July 7, 1867; San Francisco, California, U.S.
- Died: February 4, 1955 (aged 87); San Francisco, California, U.S.
- Resting place: Mountain View Cemetery
- Education: San Jose State University Wellesley College

Charlotte Anita Whitney (July 7, 1867 – February 4, 1955) was an American women's rights activist, political activist, suffragist, and early Communist Labor Party of America and Communist Party USA organizer in California.

She is best remembered as the defendant in a landmark 1927 California criminal syndicalism trial, Whitney v. California, which featured a landmark U.S. Supreme Court concurring opinion by Justice Louis Brandeis that only a "clear and present danger" would be sufficient for the legislative restriction of the right of free speech. This standard would ultimately be employed against the Communists again during the Second Red Scare of the 1950s.

== Early life ==
Anita Whitney was born in San Francisco, California, on July 7, 1867, the daughter of a pre-eminent family whose members included the American Supreme Court Justice Stephen Johnson Field and the multi-millionaire speculator and magnate Cyrus W. Field. Her father was a lawyer.

Whitney attended both private and public school growing up in Oakland, California, across the Bay from San Francisco. When her education in Oakland was complete, she attended the state normal school (now San Jose State University) in San Jose, California before leaving for the East Coast to attend Wellesley College from which she graduated in 1889.

Following graduation, Whitney worked for a time as teacher. In 1893, Whitney visited a slum in New York City. Profoundly affected, she soon developed an interest in social work. In 1901, she took over as the new executive secretary of the United Charities of Oakland, California. She continued in that capacity until 1908.

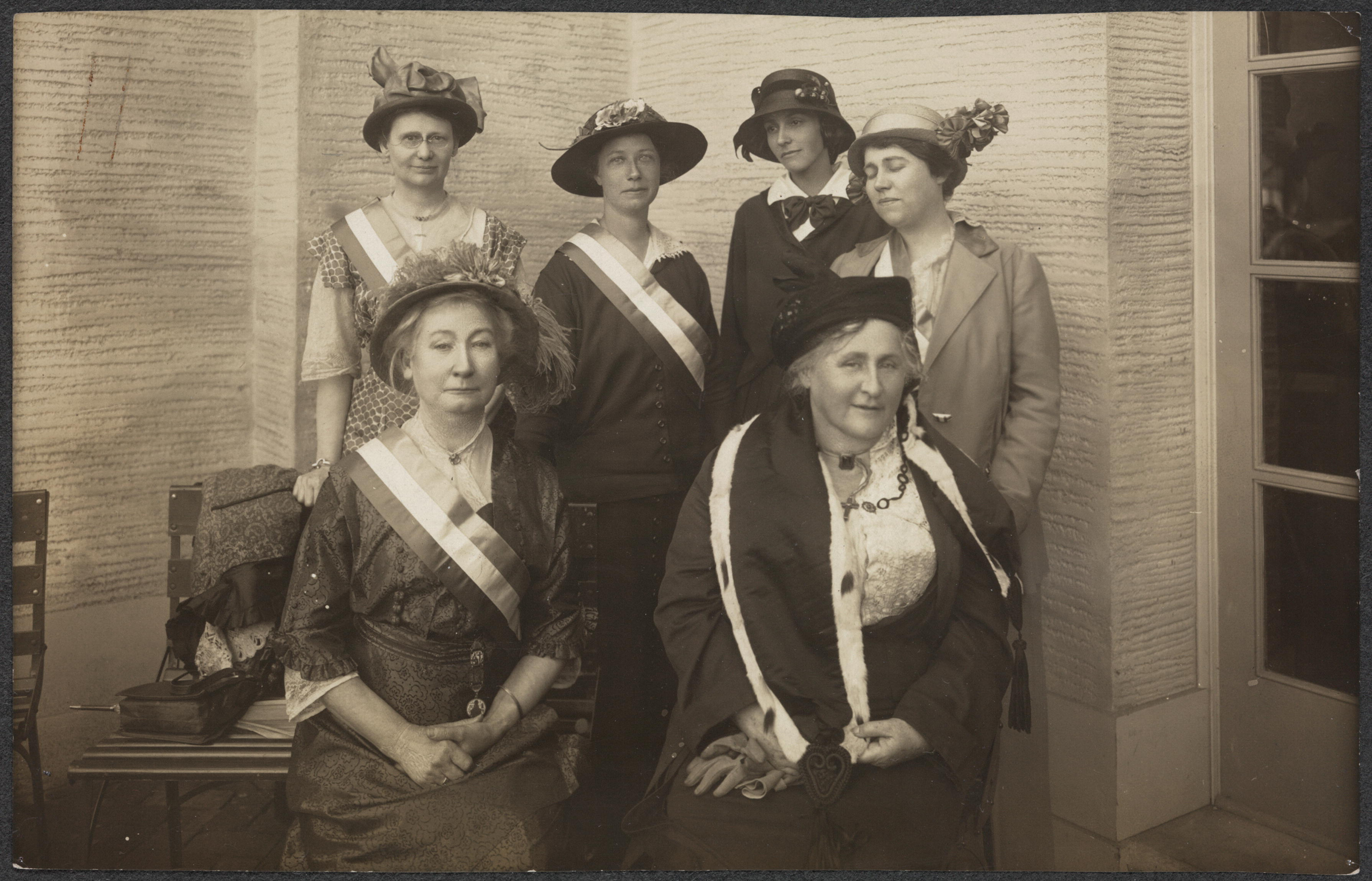
Whitney (standing, far left) with members of the National Woman's Party, April 3, 1915

The same impulse that drove her to seek betterment in the lives of the poor and downtrodden apparently also led her to campaign actively for women's suffrage. Two decades before women across the nation were entitled to vote, under the Nineteenth Amendment, Whitney took part in a series of early voting rights campaigns, from California to Connecticut. By 1911, Whitney's interest in the women's rights movement led her to become the California organizer of the National College Equal Suffrage League until 1913. She would later serve as Vice President of the National American Woman Suffrage Association.

== 1920 criminal syndicalism trial ==
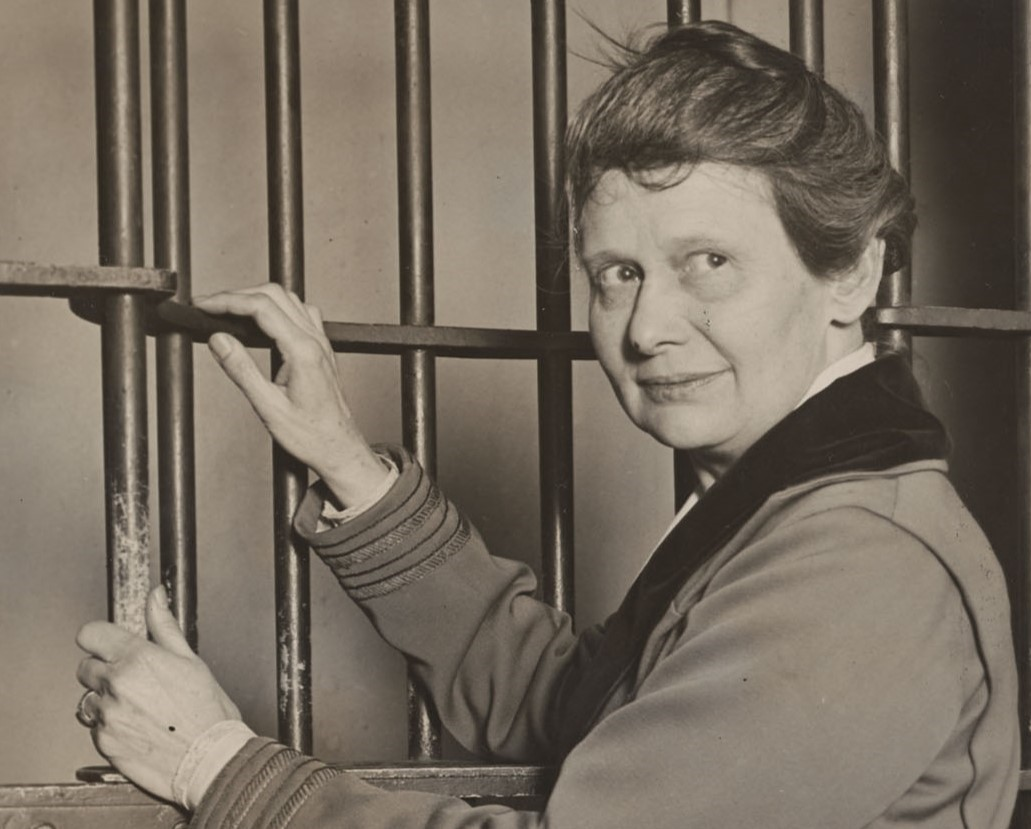
Whitney behind bars

When World War I broke out in Europe, Whitney, who was a pacifist, became a member of the anti-war Socialist Party of America, joining the party meetings of the Oakland branch. When the more radical members of the Socialist Party bolted the 1919 Emergency National Convention of the Socialist Party in Chicago and elected to create an American Communist party, Whitney, who considered the Socialist Party too moderate, threw herself into the Communists' cause and drummed up support for the new Communist Labor Party throughout California.

Following a speech at the Hotel Oakland to the Oakland Civic Club on behalf of the CLP, Whitney was arrested on November 28, 1919, and was charged with "criminal syndicalism" in violation of the California Criminal Syndicalism Act. A pre-trial hearing was held in the case on January 6, 1920, less than a week after the U.S. Department of Justice's mass crackdown on alien radicals known as the "Palmer Raids", and the case went to trial in Oakland on January 27, in the Alameda County Superior Court.

Whitney was charged with five counts of having violated the state's Criminal Syndicalism law by her membership in the Communist Labor Party. Since Whitney freely admitted her status as a charter member of the CLP, the burden of the prosecution was in attempting to demonstrate the association of the organization with the syndicalist Industrial Workers of the World and the Communist International, based in Moscow, organizations held to be illegal under California law. Once having established the criminal nature of the CLP, prosecutors argued that they would then establish the guilt of the defendant.

Whitney's defense attorney, Thomas H. O'Connor, was unable to obtain a continuance in the case on the grounds that his daughter had fallen ill with influenza in the ongoing 1918 flu pandemic. O'Connor was himself stricken on the second day of the trial and was unable to continue the trial after the third. He would die of the illness a little over a week later, as did a woman on the original jury. Citing reasons of expense, Judge James G. Quinn swore in an alternate juror and demanded for Whitney's assistant counsel, J.E. Pemberton, to proceed with the case.

A parade of 20 prosecution witnesses were presented on the stand, reading into the record hundreds of pages of IWW songs and literature, Comintern manifestos, and giving testimony about red flags in evidence at CLP headquarters. The defense called only single witness, Whitney herself. It also recalled one individual who had been forced to the stand by the prosecution, San Francisco communist leader Max Bedacht. The defense attempted to show, through its testimony, that the Communist Labor Party was opposed to the use of terrorism, violence, or force to institute changes to the American system of government.

Closing arguments were made on February 20, 1920, with the defense making the argument that the prosecution had failed to prove Whitney guilty of having committed a single illegal act. The prosecution, on the other hand, argued at length that the Communist Labor Party was nothing more than "a political adjunct of the IWW" and called upon the jury "to uphold the sacred tenets of Americanism and to place, with its verdict, the seal of disapproval on the activities of the Communist Labor Party and its blood brother, the IWW."

The jury deliberated six hours before finding Whitney guilty of the first count: having organized and joined an organization formed for the purpose of advocating criminal syndicalism. It disagreed on the other four counts. A motion for bail was denied. On February 24, 1920, the other four counts which had caused a deadlock in the jury were dismissed. Whitney was given an indeterminate sentence of from 1 to 14 years in prison at San Quentin Penitentiary.

The appeals process was begun. After 11 days imprisonment, Whitney was permitted to post $10,000 bail pending appeal only after three physicians gave testimony that continued incarceration would present a danger to her health. The first appeal was filed on February 28 in the District Court of Appeal in the First Appellate District, San Francisco, citing 16 grounds for appeal and points of error. No verdict was rendered on the case for over two full years, when the decision of the trial court was affirmed. On June 5, 1922, a petition for a rehearing of the evidence in the case was made before the California Supreme Court. The petition was denied, with two justices dissenting.

An appeal was finally made to the U.S. Supreme Court on July 13, 1922. It would be more than three years before the case was actually heard, with Walter Nelles of New York City making the argument for the appellant on October 18, 1925. On October 19, the appeal was summarily dismissed, on technical grounds. An effort was then made to obtain a pardon from California Governor Friend Richardson, and an "Anita Whitney Committee" was established to push Governor Richardson in that direction. This effort was met with the refusal of the governor to offer executive clemency to the convicted communist activist. The appeals process was still not at an end, however. In December 1925, Whitney's legal team succeeded in overcoming the jurisdictional technicalities that had sabotaged its previous effort, and it won a petition for a rehearing before the U.S. Supreme Court. The case was argued again on March 15, 1926.

Some 14 months later, on May 16, 1927, Whitney's conviction was unanimously overturned by the Supreme Court in Whitney v. California. The ruling featured a landmark concurring opinion by Justice Louis Brandeis that only a "clear and present danger" would be sufficient for the legislative restriction of the right of free speech. His opinion would be employed again in cases revoking restrictions against Communists after a subsequent wave of imprisonments during the 1950s.

== Post-trial activity ==
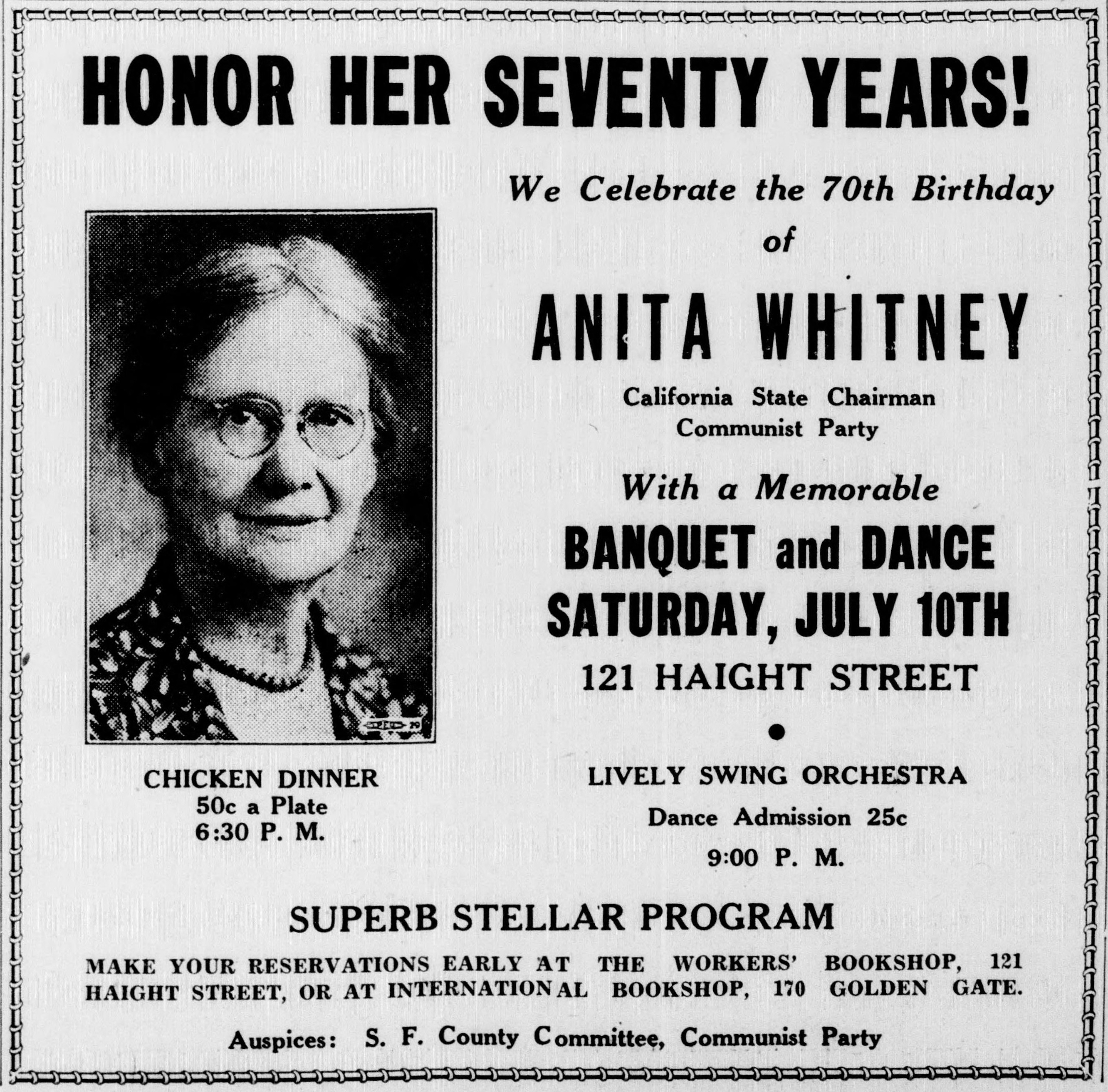
Clipping from the Western Worker, July 12, 1937

Still dogged by criminal charges from her 1919 arrest, Whitney ran for California State Controller in 1924, waging a relentless political campaign that garnered over 100,000 votes. On June 20, 1927, California Governor C. C. Young granted Whitney an unconditional pardon, believing that putting her into a cell was "unthinkable". Young added that the law under which she was convicted was constitutional but that "abnormal conditions attending the trial" greatly influenced the jury and that "under ordinary circumstances" the case never would have been prosecuted.

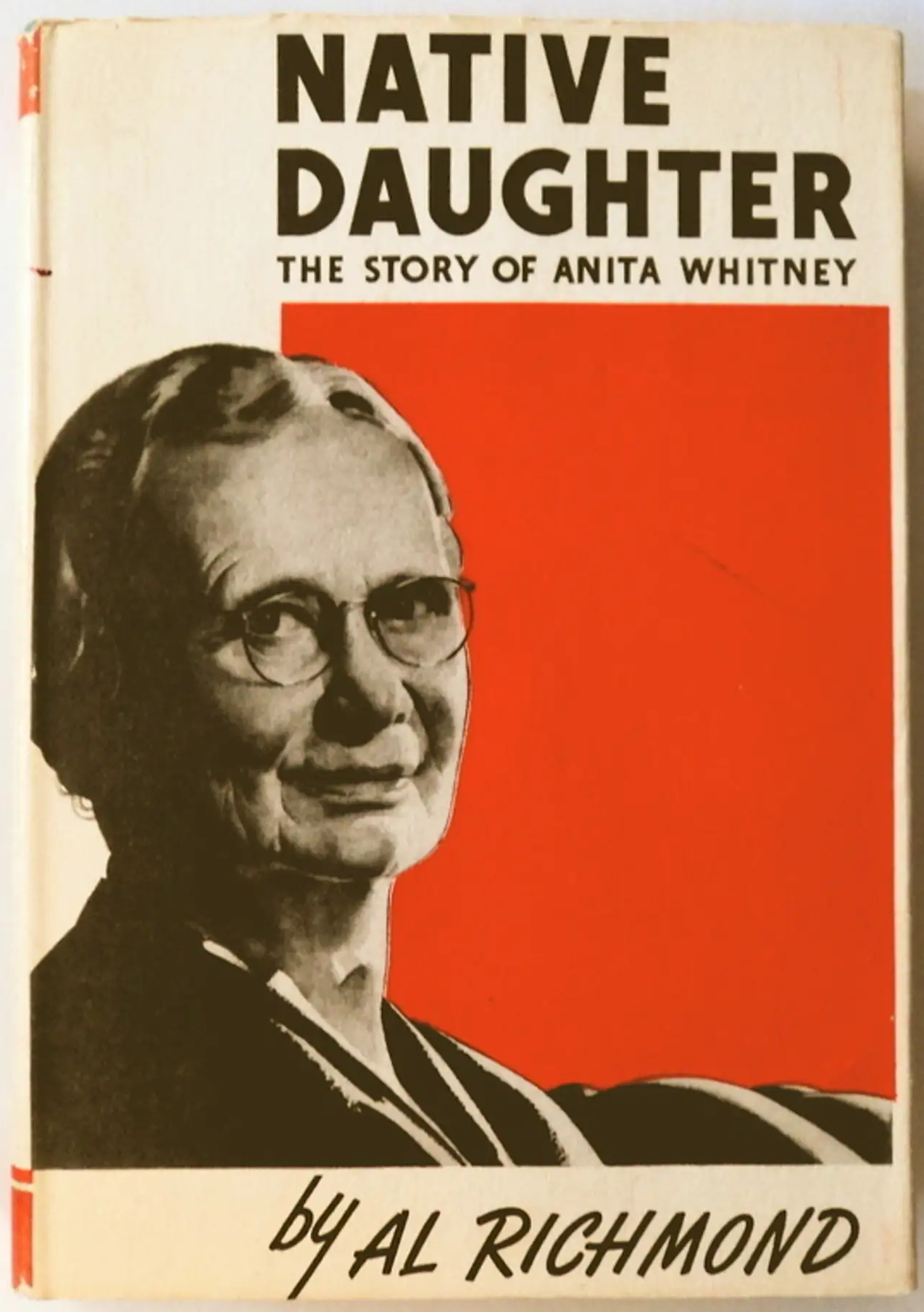
The cover of Al Richmond's Native Daughter: The Story of Anita Whitney (1942)

In 1934, she helped establish the San Francisco Workers' School (later the California Labor School). In 1935, she was again convicted by the California court system, related to election fraud, since eight circulators had made false attestations during a pre-election petition campaign, but the state watchdogs saw fit to add additional charges of "lecturing without a permit" and "distributing radical literature". Her stature among radicals only enhanced by the conviction, Whitney was named the state chairperson of the Communist Party in California in 1936. California's communists nominated Whitney for the U.S. Senate twice. Her 1940 campaign for senator won over 97,000 votes.

Although trailed by a protracted record of political harassment and accusations by the California Tenney Committee, compounded by the anticommunism promoted locally by actor and future Governor Ronald Reagan in Los Angeles and across the nation by Wisconsin Senator Joe McCarthy, her popularity among the country's radical leftists never completely disappeared.

== Death ==
Anita Whitney died on February 4, 1955, aged 87, in San Francisco.
