= Jefferson School of Social Science =

Former education institution of the American Communist Party

Coordinates: 40.7389°N 73.9960°W

The Jefferson School of Social Science was an adult education institution of the Communist Party USA located in New York City. The so-called "Jeff School" was launched in 1944 as a successor to the party's New York Workers School, albeit skewed more towards community outreach and education rather than the training of party functionaries and activists, as had been the primary mission of its predecessor. Peaking in size in 1947 and 1948 with an attendance of about 5,000, the Jefferson School was embroiled in controversy during the McCarthy period including a 1954 legal battle with the Subversive Activities Control Board over the school's refusal to register as a so-called "Communist-controlled organization."

With the Communist Party in membership decline and financial chaos, the Jefferson School was forced to close its doors in 1956 in the face of government pressure.

== Institutional history ==
=== Establishment ===
The Jefferson School of Social Science was established by the Communist Party USA (CPUSA) in 1943 as part of that organization's effort to expand the teaching of Marxism to the working class. Communists of the day believed that Marxism was a form of science which it believed was being willfully ignored in the public schools and sought to correct what it viewed as a systemic educational shortcoming. Moreover, the Communist Party sought to bolster community goodwill through its efforts as part of its Popular Front effort to integrate itself into American society.

Unlike its predecessor, the New York Workers School, the Jefferson School was not focused upon the recruitment and training of new party members but was rather conceived as tool for more broad outreach into the community. The school did contain within it a more traditional apparatus for training of professional party cadres, however, an Institute of Marxist Studies which conducted a three-year program of study.

The Jefferson School was housed in a 9-storey building located at 575 Sixth Avenue in Lower Manhattan. The school was built around a library of 30,000 volumes and offered scores of classes each term covering history, politics, trade union affairs, ideology, and the sundry social sciences. In addition to "serious" topics, the Jefferson School added courses of a more whimsical or apolitical nature, including such topics as creative writing, art appreciation, health, interior decorating, and personal beauty on a budget. Traditional lecture-based adult education was further supplemented by the Jefferson School's hosting of periodic public events, including single-admission lectures, workshops, musical concerts, and dramatic performances.

Director of the Jefferson School was a former professor of philosophy at Brooklyn College, Howard Selsam. Instructors and school administrators were paid for their efforts, with funds coming at least in part from course registration fees.

=== Growth ===
At the time of its launch in 1943, about 2,500 students attended courses at the Jefferson School of Social Science. Participation in the school doubled by the 1947/48 academic year, when attendance peaked at approximately 5,000.

In addition to its main facility on Sixth Avenue, the Jefferson School also for a time operated satellite facilities, including two temporary schools in Harlem aimed at building African-American participation in the Communist movement — the Harlem Leadership Training School and the Maceo Snipes School. These branch operations were primarily focused upon the radicalization of black students and their attraction to the Communist Party rather than the adult education orientation of the main branch of the Jefferson School.

While the Jefferson School in New York City was the flagship of the Communist Party's adult education and party training schools, it was not the organization's sole enterprise. Other Communist Party schools during the middle part of the 20th century included the Abraham Lincoln School for Social Science in Chicago, the Samuel Adams School in Boston, and the San Francisco Labor School.

=== Legal battle ===
In 1949, FBI undercover agent/informer Angela Calomiris testified during the Foley Square trial that she took "educational courses" on communism at the Jefferson School and the New York Workers School.

During the Second Red Scare of the early 1950s, the United States government attempted to identify, isolate, and discredit various so-called front groups of the Communist Party. Key to this process was mandatory registration of Communist-controlled institutions with the Subversive Activities Control Board (SACB). The Jefferson School initially fought this requirement, an action which resulted in a 1954 legal case, Jefferson School v. Subversive Activities Control Board. An appeal dragged on to 1963, after the dissolution of the school.

=== Termination ===
From about 1953 the Jefferson School of Social Science had begun having trouble attracting enough paying students to cover the cost of its operations, forcing the Communist Party to assume an active role in subsidizing its operations. This situation worsened as the decade progressed, with negative publicity associated with the school's legal difficulties and a growing popular hostility to Communism placing both the school and the party in an ever more difficult financial position.

The February 1956 secret speech of Soviet leader Nikita Khrushchev, "On the Cult of Personality and Its Consequences," had the effect of disorienting and discouraging the membership of the CPUSA. Shocked by Khrushchev's revelations of the mass crimes of the Stalin era, the party lost a spate of members and split into bitterly feuding factions who disagreed about the nature of the Soviet state and the path forward for American radicals. The Jefferson School played a part in this internal debate, sponsoring a series of four public meetings dealing with the importance of the soviet leader's revelations at the 20th Congress of the Communist Party of the Soviet Union.

At the last of these sessions, John Gates, editor of the official party newspaper, The Worker, was sharply critical of the American party's blind obedience, its support of its Trotskyist opponents under the Smith Act, and its failure to commit itself to a peaceful path to socialism based upon maintained civil liberties. The school became in its last year loosely associated with the Gates reform faction, which was opposed by a group favoring continuation of past practices, which included party leaders William Z. Foster, Eugene Dennis, and Gus Hall.

With the Communist Party shattered and impoverished, the Jefferson School of Social Science terminated its operations in 1956, having been branded as a "Communist-controlled organization" by the SACB.

== Leadership ==
The first and only director of the school was the philosopher Howard Selsam. According to investigation led by Benjamin Mandel of the US Senate Internal Security Subcommittee (SISS), the school's 1951 administration included Frederick V. Field as secretary and Alexander Trachtenberg as treasurer.

According to a 1956 announcement of the school's closure, the school's administration comprised: Howard Selsam, director; David Goldway, executive secretary; and Doxey A. Wilkerson, director of curriculum.

== Legacy ==
The bulk of the Jefferson School's papers resides at the Tamiment Library and Robert F. Wagner Labor Archives at New York University. Some eight linear feet of material is held in the New York University collection.

== See also ==
- Abraham Lincoln School for Social Science
- Rand School of Social Science (1906)
- Work People's College (1907)
- Brookwood Labor College (1921)
- New York Workers School (1923):
  - New Workers School (1929)
  - Jefferson School of Social Science (1944)
- Highlander Research and Education Center (formerly Highlander Folk School) (1932)
  - Commonwealth College (Arkansas) (1923–1940)
  - Southern Appalachian Labor School (since 1977)
- San Francisco Workers' School (1934)
  - California Labor School (formerly Tom Mooney Labor School) (1942)
- Continuing education
- Los Angeles People's Education Center

== External sources ==
- Richard J. Altenbaugh, Education for Struggle: American Labor Colleges of the 1920s and 1930s. Philadelphia, PA: Temple University Press, 1990.
- Peter Filardo, "Guide to the Jefferson School of Social Science (New York, NY) Records and Indexes," Tamiment Library and Robert F. Wagner Labor Archives, Elmer Holmes Bobst Library, New York University, New York, NY.
- Marvin Gettleman, "Lost World of U.S. Labor Education: Curricula at East and West Coast Community Schools, 1944-1957," Paper presented to the Gotham Center for New York City History, October 7, 2001.
- Marvin E. Gettleman, "'No Varsity Teams': New York's Jefferson School of Social Science, 1943–1956," Science & Society, vol. 66, no. 3 (Fall 2002), pp. 336–359. In JSTOR
- Andy Hines, Outside Literary Studies: Black Criticism and the University. Chicago: University of Chicago Press, 2022.
- Daniel F. Ring, "Two Cultures: Libraries, the Unions, and the 'Case' of the Jefferson School of Social Science," The Journal of Library History, vol. 20, no. 3 (Summer 1985), pp. 287– 301.
- Ellen Schrecker, No Ivory Tower: McCarthyism and the Universities. New York: Oxford University Press, 1986.
- Jefferson School of Social Science Papers, Wisconsin Historical Society, University of Wisconsin, Madison, WI.
