= Fred Beal =

American labor-union organizer (1896–1954)

Fred Erwin Beal
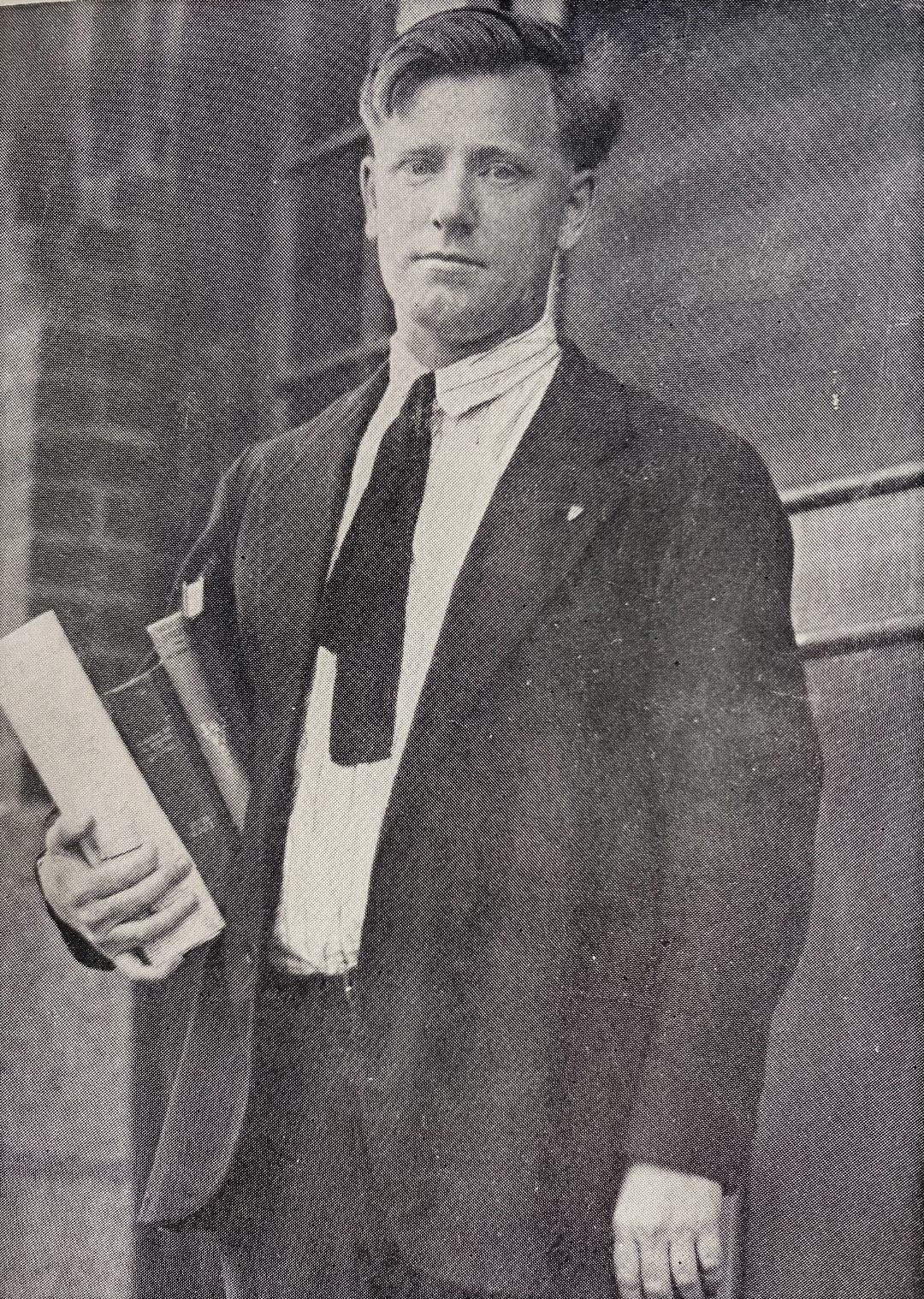
- Born: 1896
- Died: 1954 (aged 57–58)
- Occupations: Textile worker, union organiser, party activist
- Organization(s): Industrial Workers of the World, National Textile Workers Union
- Notable work: Proletarian Journey: New England, Gastonia, Moscow (1938)
- Political party: Socialist Party of America, Communist Party of the USA

Fred Erwin Beal (1896–1954) was an American labor-union organizer whose critical reflections on his work and travel in the Soviet Union divided left-wing and liberal opinion. In 1929 he had been a cause célèbre when, in Gastonia, North Carolina, he was convicted in an irregular trial of conspiracy in the strike-related killing of a local police chief. But having escaped to the Soviet Union, his decision in 1933 to return and bear witness to the costs of Stalin's collectivist policies, including famine in Ukraine, was disparaged and resisted by many of his erstwhile supporters.

The New York Times remained committed to what it has since acknowledged was the "tendentious" reporting of Soviet achievements by its Pulitzer Prize-winning Moscow correspondent Walter Duranty. It was left first to Forverts, the Yiddish-language version of a New York socialist daily, and then, nationwide, to the right-wing Hearst Press to publish Beal's accounts.

In his later memoirs, Beal's disillusion with communism extended to his experience as a labor organizer with the Communist Party in the United States and with what he concluded had been the party's calculated sacrifice of his, and his co-defendants', interests in their Gastonia trial.

== Work as labor organizer ==
=== Lawrence and the Wobblies ===
In January 1912, Beal, a fifteen-year-old mill hand, stopped machinery and with his co-workers walked out on his employers in his hometown, Lawrence Massachusetts. The Industrial Workers of the World, the “Wobblies”, had shown that a largely female and immigrant workforce could organize. Beal recalled that, against all expectations, it was the most recent immigrant groups that sustained the strike over the next two bitterly cold winter months: "the Italians, Poles, Syrians [Lebanese] and Franco-Belgians".

The Wobblies did not shy from confrontation, but they also courted public opinion. In a signature move “Big" Bill Haywood and Elizabeth Gurley Flynn arranged the public transport of hundreds of the strikers' hungry children to sympathetic families in New York, New Jersey, and Vermont. When the state's heavy-handed efforts to stop the embarrassing exodus led to Congressional hearings on the working conditions, the mill owners settled. Workers in Lawrence and throughout New England secured raises of up to 20 percent.

Beal signed both with the Wobblies and with Socialist Party of U.S. presidential candidate Eugene Debs, who despite his differences with the syndicalism of the Wobblies' One Big Union, had rallied support for the Lawrence strike. In the midst of the post-World War recession and the Red Scare of 1919–20, Beal tried to revive the local IWW organization by forming a Rank and File Committee of Textile Workers. While this effort at bottom-up organizing was ruthlessly commandeered by the new-formed Communist Party (CPUSA), Beal was drawn to its disciplined militants because they were themselves "workers in the mills". His fellow Socialists he had come to view chiefly as “middle-class intellectuals who loved to theorize about Utopia” and felt they were bringing it about when at every election they voted against the major parties.

=== Drawn to the Communists ===
On the road that would eventually take him to Moscow, Beal identified the 1924 presidential campaign of Robert La Follette as a turning point. La Follette (who had changed his previous pro-Moscow stance after visiting the Soviet Union in late 1923) was supported as a "progressive" by the Socialists and by the American Federation of Labour. The failure of his campaign to check Calvin Coolidge's clean sweep of the northern industrial states, persuaded Beal that "the American workers would never be won over to the political side."

Beal dropped out of the Socialist Party and for the next three years devoted himself to local organizing within the One Big Union. When the setbacks he encountered caused him again to despair, he was drawn to the Communists through their "united fronts". This was first to their defense campaign for Sacco and Vanzetti in 1927 (in the course of which he reported being badly beaten by American Legionnaires) and then, via a United Front Committee of Textile Workers in Lawrence to the party-controlled National Textile Workers Union (NTWU). He viewed the Communist Party as "the most effective radical organization in the field, almost the only one that was really active in behalf of the workers". Many Wobbly leaders (including Bill Haywood and Elizabeth Gurley Flynn) and thousands of Wobbly rank-and-filers had, or were making, the same political journey.

In 1928, a mill strike in New Bedford placed Beal "in the forefront of Communist labor organizers", although the struggle itself ended in a defeat for the workers. After 23 weeks the 25 to 30,000 strikers no longer responded to prodding from the organizers that party headquarters had sent in "droves" from "Boston, New York and points west". Beal's Textile Mill Committees had demanded a 20% wage increase (together with reduced hours and equal pay for women); in a deal negotiated by the established craft unions, the exhausted workers settled for a 5 per cent pay cut.

When reassigned to North Carolina (where his only contact was a blind Party member in Charlotte) Beal was entertaining growing doubts. There had been too great a willingness to override rank-and-file deliberation, to block local initiative and, ultimately, to "make a political game" of what for the workers was "a struggle for existence". Beal had begun to make a distinction between "the Party and the cause". Even the language of the party was suspect. When, to a worker who objected to being "called such names", Beal sought to defend the term "proletariat" he was confronted with a dictionary: "Proletariat: the lowest class of ancient Rome, contributing nothing to the state but offspring. Applied to the lowest class of society".

=== Gastonia trial ===
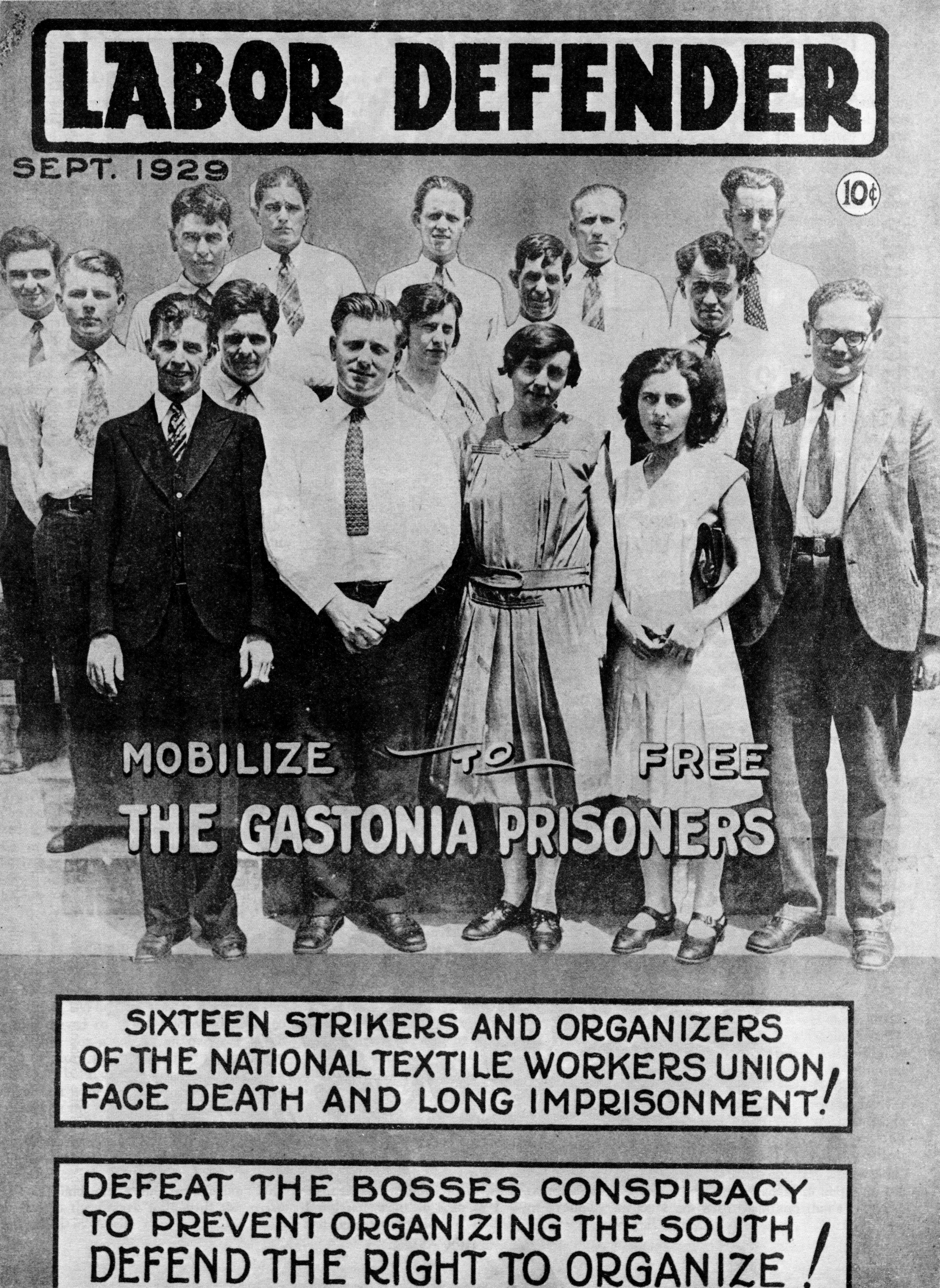
International Labor Defense campaign for Beal and his Gastonia co defendants, 1929

In the Loray Mill strike in Gastonia, the politically isolated NTWU again led workers (many, like Beal's parents in Lawrence, failed farmers) to defeat. Demanding a forty-hour week at twenty dollars and again (a demand Beal omits to mention in his memoir) equal pay for women, they were discharged, beaten and evicted from their company-owned homes. The Party's determination to bring out "the political nature of the conflict" played to the employers' anti-communist rhetoric (George Pershing, who shadowed Beal throughout, announced to his first Gastonia audience that he was a "Bolshevist" sent by the Party to spearhead "a gigantic movement in the entire South" to overturn the rule of capital). While the constant portrayal of Beal and his associates as a menace to "American tradition and American government" may have had little impact on the strikers, it helped sanction the authorities' resort to violence, and made it more difficult for the central issues of the strike to be considered by the wider community on their merits.

In the final act, Beal believed that he and his six co-defendants had been deliberately sacrificed. Acting on party instructions, witnesses went beyond testimony about the circumstances of the shooting of the Police Chief Orville F. Anderholt: a sequence of events in which strikers were attacked and Beal's fellow NTWU organizer and the balladeer of the struggle, Ella May Wiggins, was killed. They made speeches. Edith Miller of the Young Communist League volunteered she was teaching the children of the strikers communist doctrine. The uproar "shattered" any prospect of an acquittal. The prosecution made "the overthrow by force of the constitution of the United States of America", advocated by a party that was "a branch of the Soviet Union of Russia", the effective charge. Much was also made of Beal's "notorious advocacy of social equality among the races" (to Beal's dismay, supporters sought to seat an alternative black-and-white "jury" in the public gallery), The only reason he and his co-defendants were able to leave town was because the judge, to the surprise of many, allowed bail and set the bond (provided by the American Civil Liberties Union) comparatively low.

The party was thus deprived of the opportunity to mount another Sacco-and-Venzetti-scale united-front campaign. This had already been in the making, with the party-controlled International Labor Defense (ILD) raising funds on the cry "SHALL SACCO and VANZETTI HAVE Died in vain?, Help Smash the Gastonia Murder Frameup".

After sentencing in Gastonia, Clarence Miller wrote to Max Bedacht, acting CPUSA leader, warning him that Beal had "lost faith in the Party". Beal later told the journalist and civil-rights advocate Harry Golden, that Bedacht's predecessor, William Z. Foster, "had directed the whole Gastonia show and that the people in the Kremlin insisted on getting weekly reports".

== To the Soviet Union and back ==
When Beal decided to skip the appeal of his Gastonia trial conviction, and travel to Russia he was following his co-defendant and Communist Party (CPUSA) comrade, Clarence Miller. Both men had been facing seventeen to twenty years hard labor in the Raleigh penitentiary. In Moscow, their paths parted. Beal was sent away on a propaganda tour of Central Asia (where he was alarmed to see children mobilized for work in the cotton fields). Then in 1931, after being persuaded by the American party leaders to end an undercover return to the United States, to a new large-scale tractor plant in Kharkiv. This was a project hailed by Stalin as "a steel bastion of the collectivization of agriculture in the Ukraine".

Meanwhile, Beal describes Miller, "who was never a worker", as "blossoming out" in Moscow as a "Red professor" with a comfortable apartment. From his vantage in Kharkiv, Beal wrote, "I could not, like Clarence Miller and so many other complaisant dream-walkers, convince myself that the suffering and futility which I saw everywhere in Stalin-land were but figments of the Capitalist imagination."

At the Kharkiv Tractor Plant, Beal directed "Propaganda and Cultural Affairs" for a colony of several hundred foreign workers and specialists. Under his name, Moscow published a Pictorial Survey of their contribution to "socialist construction". In this, Beal admitted only to the voluntary renunciation of "luxuries". Later, he was to give a very different account. The colony suffered acute shortages of food and fuel, but was "divided by a chasm from the ten thousand Russian workers employed". To protest their conditions, these workers resorted to the only weapon open to them, "silent sabotage". Meanwhile, at the factory gates there was starvation.

In the surrounding countryside Beal, in the spring of 1933, reported finding bodies unburied on abandoned fields and in deserted villages.

I have seen dead people who had died naturally, before. But this was from a cause and a definite one. A cause which I was somehow associated with, which I had been supporting. [...] Some bodies were decomposed. Others were fresher. When we opened the doors, huge rats would scamper to their holes and then come out and stare at us. [Behind the houses] signs were stuck up on graves [...]

I LOVE STALIN. BURY HIM HERE AS SOON AS POSSIBLE!

THE COLLECTIVE DIED ON US!

WE TRIED A COLLECTIVE. THIS IS THE RESULT!

[...] On our way back people told us that that village was to be burned.

In July 1932, Beal had learned that a third Gastonia convict and fellow exile K. Y. "Red" Hendricks had returned to New York and was facing extradition to North Carolina. In response to his calls for an international campaign on his behalf, Beal was told that nothing was to be done, that Hendricks had "put the Soviet Union in an embarrassing position": American workers would be asking "Is American jail better than living in the Soviet Union?" Recognizing that no open letter from him would get past the Soviet censors, and himself thoroughly disillusioned, Beal determined upon his own return. Early in August 1933, he managed to persuade Kharkiv authorities that he had Moscow's permission to secure an exit visa in order to renew his American passport abroad (the USA had no consular offices in the Soviet Union until 1934). He had thought of visiting Leon Trotsky in his Turkish exile, but did not have the funds to secure a visa from the Turkish consul in Odessa. In September he crossed over the border into Latvia.

== Testifying to the famine ==
Beal's account of his Ukrainian experience was first published in June 1935 in Forverts, the Yiddish-language edition of the New York City Jewish socialist daily The Forward. His story corroborated that of the paper's labor editor, Harry Lang, who had himself been to the region. Both proposed a death toll in the millions. According to Beal, when he asked Grigory Petrovsky (Hryhorii Petrovskyi), Chairman of the Ukrainian SSR, what he was to tell workers at the tractor plant who were saying that "millions of peasants are dying all over Russia", Petrovsky replied: "Tell them nothing!" and that "the glorious future of the Soviet Union will justify" the loss. (Petrovsky's plea for emergency relief and a suspension of grain collections had been rejected by Stalin). Lang cited a high Ukrainian Soviet official confidentially conceding that famine took the lives of six million.

National coverage was secured when William Randolph Hearst ordered the editors of his numerous titles to cover the story, drawing not only on the testimony of Beal and of Lang, but also on that of the Welsh freelance journalist Gareth Jones. Jones's eyewitness reports from Ukraine had been published in Britain by the Manchester Guardian, but like Beal in the United States he found they were rejected by much of the established and left-wing press. In The New York Times, Walter Duranty dismissed the Hearst-circulated reports of man-made starvation as a politically motivated "scare story".

To better serve Hearst's new policy of opposition to diplomatic recognition of Moscow, in articles written by Thomas Walker the eyewitness accounts were made to appear more current than they were. This allowed Louis Fischer in The Nation to accuse the Hearst press of pure invention. Fischer, although according to Myra Page himself a witness to the famine in 1933, had returned to Ukraine in 1934 and could report that he had seen no evidence of starvation. Like Duranty, he proposed that the whole affair was merely an attempt by Hearst to "spoil Soviet-American relations" as part of "an anti-red campaign".

Beal's former party comrades claimed that, facing prison on his return to the United States, Beal had prostituted himself to this campaign. It is a charge Douglas Tottle repeated decades later in a book that purports to expose the "Ukrainian genocide myth": Beal had sold out for money and hope of a reduced sentence. Beal acknowledged that, in the eyes of Communists and those he described as "their liberal lackeys", having his story placed (he claimed by an agent) in the Hearst newspapers "completely blotted out" his record as a strike leader and as a victim of the "Gastonia frame up". But the Hearst papers, he argued, had published a "host of Communist and near-Communist writers" and were "essentially" no more suspect than "other capitalist journals and magazines to which the Stalinists contribute their propaganda". His own ideals, he insisted, had not changed.

Beal's memoir of mill work and labor struggles in the United States, and of life as a foreign worker under Stalin, was published as Proletarian Journey: New England, Gastonia, Moscow by Hillman-Curl, New York, in 1937. In Britain it was published as Word From Nowhere: The Story of a Fugitive from Two Worlds by the Right Book Club in 1938. This coincided with an offering in Britain from the Left Book Club: a panorama of the Soviet Union (Comrades and Citizens, by Seema Rynin Allan) in which Kharkov's new tractors were celebrated for assisting with "the biggest harvest Russia ever had".

== Beal and Trotskyism ==
Beal's memoir concludes with the declaration:

Soviet Russia is the grandest fraud in history... But I am as convinced as ever that there is another road to a free and classless humanity, a road which is worth the quest, and which can be found only by minds liberated from the worship of false gods and by spirits strong enough to face the truth in the quest for truth.

For Beal this other road to socialism was not Trotskyism. Referring to Beal as "one of the leaders of the workers in America", in an article completed shortly before his assassination in August 1940, Leon Trotsky cited Proletarian Journey. In Beal's description of their solicitous treatment in Moscow ("good room, good food, and good pay for speeches and writing"), Trotsky found evidence of the grooming of foreign leftists by Stalin's secret operatives. In 1938, the American Trotskyist weekly, Socialist Appeal had given front-page coverage to a campaign to prevent Beal's recommittal in North Carolina ("Boss Court Holds Beal on Old Score").

But Beal's condemnation of "Stalin land" was too sweeping to accommodate Trotsky's insistence that the Soviet Union remained, albeit "degenerated", a workers state. Rather, for the editor of the Socialist Appeal, Max Shachtman, Beal's description of the Soviet party-state bureaucracy as a "new exploiting class" was to be a point of departure in a break with Trotsky. As he moved with his supporters to an avowedly Marxist version of democratic socialism, Shachtman denied that the "bureaucratic collectivism" of the Soviet Union was "in any sense" socialist.

== Last years ==
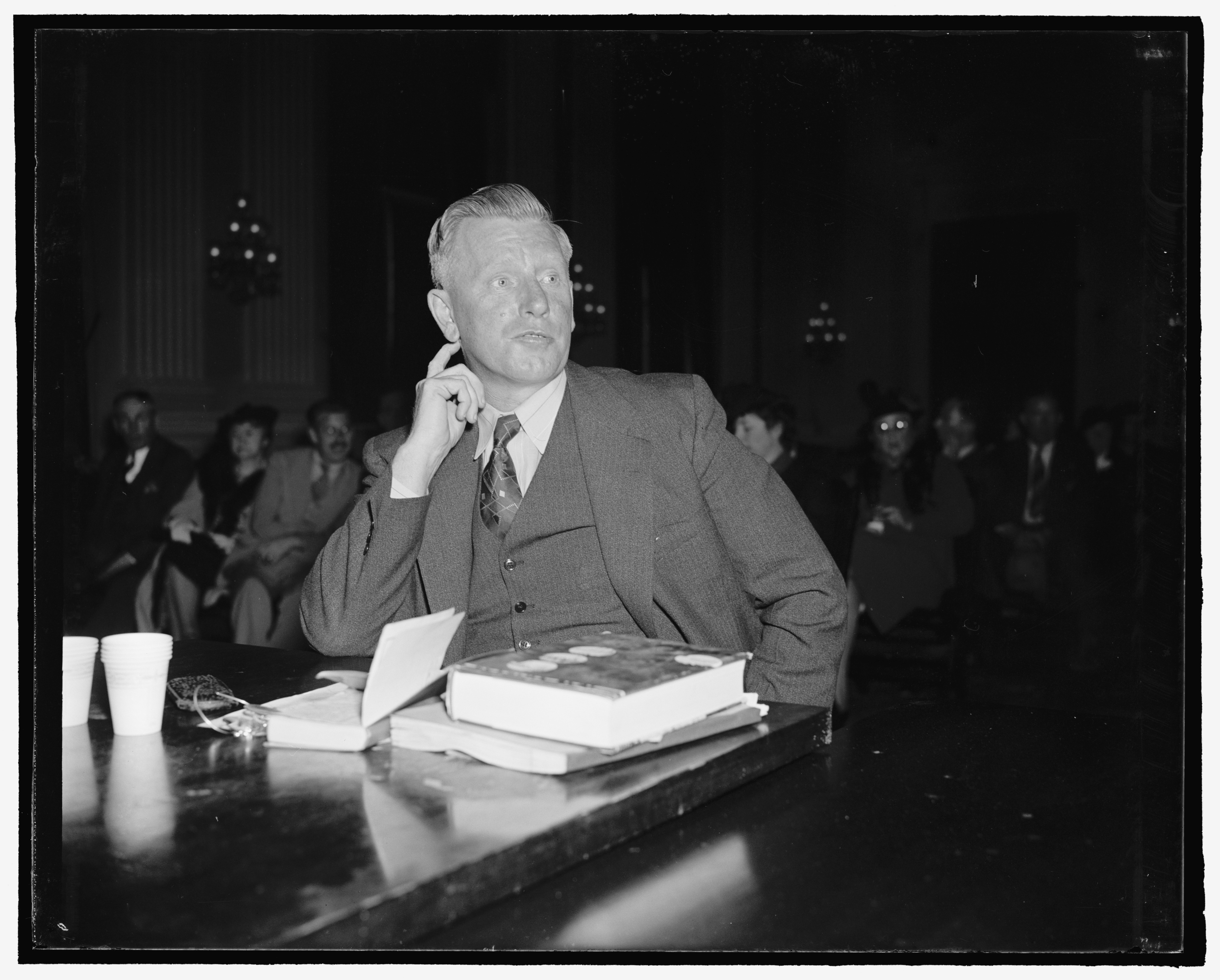
Beal testifies before the Dies Committee, October 18, 1939

In February 1938, Beal surrendered himself in Raleigh, North Carolina, to Governor Clyde R. Hoey, who, nine years before had been his prosecutor in Gastonia. Beal later wrote: "in my escape from the Soviet state, I simply transferred myself from one prison to another". The ILD was notably silent, but a non-partisan committee for his defense was joined, shortly before Communists helped secure his ouster as president of the United Auto Workers, by Homer Martin; by Congressmen Thomas Ryun Amlie of the Wisconsin Progressive Party and Democrat Jerry Voorhis (who in California was to be the first political opponent of a red-baiting Richard M Nixon); by the sociologist and pacifist Emily Greene Balch, the New York attorney and feminist Dorothy Kenyon and the free-love advocate and poet Sara Bard Field. The Committee reported hostile pressure from members of the ILD and anonymous threats.

In October 1939, Beal was subpoenaed to testify before the House Un-American Activities Committee (HUAC) in Washington. Beal repeated his claim that the CPUSA leaders deliberately made the Gastonia trial a vehicle for Communist propaganda, inflaming the southern jurors and dooming the defendants. Afterward, he said, Communists in Manhattan had shipped him and his fellows off "to show the Russians by our coming that there was a bad situation in America”. After he returned briefly and secretly to the U. S. in 1931 and betrayed his disillusion, one of them told him that the Russians "should have shot him while they had him".

In 1940, Beal's seventeen to twenty-year sentence was reduced seven years by Governor Hoey. His parole was authorized by governor J. Melville Broughton in 1942.

In 1947, Beal appeared again before HUAC, then investigating the activities of Leon Josephson, who had been one of the ILD attorneys at Gastonia. Beal testified that he had met Josephson several times while in Moscow and that he knew him to be a Soviet secret agent. It was a charge for which the committee had substantial corroborating testimony and evidence.

With Norman Thomas, Socialist presidential candidate, and David Dubinsky of the International Ladies Garment Workers Union standing as references, in 1948 Beal had his U.S. citizenship restored. He worked for a while in a New York City textile company, quietly pursued union activities and lectured on Communism's threat to labor. He died, age 57, of a heart attack in Lawrence, Massachusetts. The mills he had first entered at age 14 had since migrated to the non-union south. Beal was survived by two brothers.

== Works ==
- 1933 Foreign Workers in a Soviet Tractor Plant: A Pictorial Survey of the Life of Foreign Workers and Specialists During the Period of Socialist Construction 1931-1933. Co-operative Pub. Society of Foreign Workers in the U.S.S.R. Moscow
- 1937 Proletarian Journey: New England, Gastonia, Moscow, Hillman-Curl, New York
- 1938 Word From Nowhere: The Story of a Fugitive from Two Worlds, The Right Book Club, London, (British edition of Proletarian Journey)
- 1949 The Red Fraud: An Expose of Stalinism, Tempo Publishers, New York

== In fiction ==
Strike! by Mary Heaton Vorse (1930) was the first of several "Gastonia novels" inspired by the Loray Mill strike of 1929. Vorse, who in the Lawrence strike of 1912 established herself as a labor journalist, produced the most historically accurate of these. When she first met Beal in Gastonia her impression was of a "nice" but "weak boy, oppressed with the tremendous weight of the strike." In the novel, his counterpart, Fer Deane, under constant threat of assassination leaves much of the work to Irma Rankin and the chief protagonist Mamie Lewes, characters recognizable as Beal's assistants Vera Buch Weisbord and Ella May Wiggins. The murder of Lewes/Wiggins inspires Deane to join the picketing workers in a final demonstration of resistance. The novel (which was completed before Beal and his five co-defendants jumped bail) ends with his martyrdom: Deane and five male workers are killed.

In Call Home the Hearth (1932), Olive Tilford Dargan (writing as Fielding Burke) has the Wiggins character, Ashma Waycaster, saving Beal/Amos Freer from a murder plot, while she contends on every side, including the Communist Party, with male presumption.

Beal appears as a character in John Sweeney's thriller The Useful Idiot (2020). The "useful idiot" of the story is Walter Duranty with Gareth Jones as his journalistic nemesis. Sweeney employs creative license to bring Fred Beal, Bill Haywood and Jones together in Moscow in 1933, a point at which Haywood had been dead five years.
