= Virginia Lathrop =

Writer and journalist

Virginia Terrell Lathrop (1900–1974) worked as a journalist in North Carolina, New York, London and Paris, and served on the board of trustees of the Consolidated University of North Carolina.

== Career ==
Virginia Terrell Lathrop was born in 1900 near Raleigh, North Carolina. She graduated from the North Carolina College for Women, now the University of North Carolina at Greensboro, in 1923. Following the completion of her education, she worked as a journalist for the Raleigh News and Observer, the Asheville Citizen, and the New York Post, as well as working in the London and Paris offices of the New York Herald Tribune.

Lathrop worked as the head of the Woman's College News Bureau from 1937 to 1941. She later served on the board of trustees of the Consolidated University of North Carolina, a role she held until her death. In 1952, she was appointed to the board's executive committee. In 1972, she served as a member of the initial Board of Governors which oversaw operation of all sixteen public universities in North Carolina.

Lathrop published two books. Her 1942 book, Educate a Woman, examined the University of North Carolina's Women's College campus since its founding in 1861. Her second book was a walking guide of the University of North Carolina's Greensboro campus. Lathrop also edited The Southern Packet, a publication presenting regional books from the southern United States.

Her writings included articles on Olive Tilford Dargan,

== Honors and awards ==
The University of North Carolina at Greensboro awarded her the Alumni Service Award in 1965, and an honorary degree in 1966. After her death in 1974, the North Carolina Board of Governors passed a resolution to honor her service to education in North Carolina.

== Personal life ==
Lathrop was married to Albert H. Lathrop. Lathrop died on December 1, 1974.
