= Abe Birnbaum =

American artist (1899–1966)

Abe Birnbaum (1899– June 19, 1966) was an American illustrator and cartoonist in New York City. His work appeared in newspapers, magazines, and books, including the 1953 Caldecott Honor picture book Green Eyes. In his 39-year career, Birnbaum created about 150 covers for The New Yorker magazine.

== Biography ==
Abe Birnbaum was born in Manhattan in New York City. He studied illustration under Boardman Robinson and Kenneth Hayes Miller at the Art Students League of New York, and went on to a career in cartoons and illustrations, often selling his work to newspapers and magazines. Birnbaum's first drawing, sketch of Theodore Dreiser, was printed in the New York Herald Tribune.

Throughout his career, Birnbaum held positions at New York World, New York Post and The New York World-Telegram. His illustrations appeared in magazines including the Harper's Bazaar, Vogue and The New York Times. He was particularly known for his work in the New Yorker, where he was noticed and recruited by editor Harold Ross. Birnbaum's illustrations and spot drawings appeared frequently throughout the New Yorker to punctuate and indent text columns. One drawing of a keyhole that accompanied a New Yorker story on burglary was described as "the most intensely keyhole keyhole there has ever been."

Birnbaum typically worked from his home studio in Croton, New York, where he lived with 15 cats. As an artist, he was exacting in his work, sometimes re-drawing an object as many as 200 times. In addition to his upstate home, he kept an apartment in Manhattan at 220 East 67th Street.

He illustrated children's books including Green Eyes, which won a 1953 Caldecott Honor. With cartoonist Syd Hoff, Birnbaum drew figures in Columbus Circle for a crowd of onlookers to watch, an activity they called "chalk talk". In 1938, Birnbaum painted a mural called "The Four Seasons" for Café Society, operated by Barney Josephson. His mural featured the same French poodles with four different hairstyles for each season, and Birnbaum reportedly stepped back and stated "My work vibrates" upon completion. "The Four Seasons" mural was adapted by the luxury department store Bergdorf-Goodman into an elaborate window display.

Birnbaum's work appeared in exhibitions at the Carnegie Institute and the Philadelphia Museum of Art. In his later career, Birnbaum created portraits of the sculptor Henry Moore and the lighting designer Abe Feder. According to the New Yorker, "The older he became, the younger and more joyous his work became." Birnbaum was known to often say certain refrains: "Nothing is ugly" and "Everything is what it is."

== Personal life and death ==
On June 19, 1966, Birnbaum died at Lenox Hill Hospital at the age of 67, just three weeks after one of his New Yorker covers appeared. He was married to Frieda Roberts, who survived him in his death. His obituary in the New Yorker described him as "a burly, black-browed man with dark-bright eyes and a bantering, affectionate nature". The piece said that Birnbaum "painted and drew, if not as easily as he breathed, as naturally".

At the time of his death, the New Yorker had a large store of unpublished covers and drawings as a result of Birnbaum's "exceptional productivity" and the magazine could continue to print his work for years.
