= Bayard Wootten =

American photographer (1875–1959)

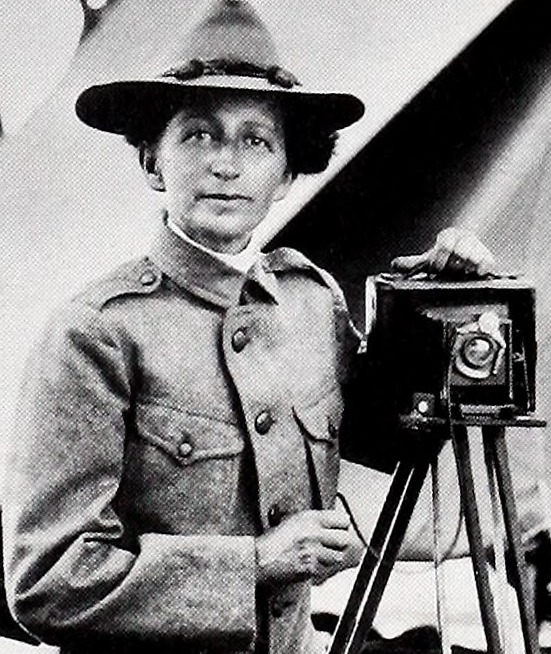

Mary Bayard Morgan Wootten (1875–1959) was an American photographer. She named Pepsi Cola and designed its trademark for her famous neighbor Caleb Bradham, who invented the drink. Wootten was the first woman in the National Guard and the first woman to make a picture from an airplane in 1914 at Glenburnie Park in New Bern. She opened six photographic studios, and raised two children after her husband abandoned her for the Gold rush. Wootten also was published in six books over the decades illustrating them with her brilliant photography. Wootten once hung over the edge of Linville Falls to get a better angle. The Wootten-Moulton museum will be opening in New Bern North Carolina soon in an historic home on East Front Street by Anthony Lilly and Ashley Norman. Her photographs of a deteriorating Camp Bragg saved the encampment which would later become Fort Bragg. Wootten opened The Photo Hutt on Fort Bragg making postcards for the soldiers, which was a big thing at the time. She loved meditation, spiritualism and her community. Her photo studio in New Bern won an award from The Walt Disney company and Wootten continues to inspire budding photographers around the world.

== Biography ==
Wootten was born in New Bern, North Carolina in 1875 to Mary and Rufus Morgan. Rufus was the inspiration for his daughter's interest in photography and died in California after collecting and eating poisonous mushrooms. Wootten attended New Bern public schools and then studied at the State Normal and Industrial College (now the University of North Carolina at Greensboro) from 1892 to 1894. After college, she briefly taught art at the Arkansas School for the Deaf and the Georgia School for the Deaf. When her husband Charles Wootten abandoned her for the Gold rush she returned home to New Bern to support her two sons by painting flowers on china and fine dresses. She even taxidermied animals including an American alligator which is in the Berlin Museum of natural history. She received basic instruction in photography from Edward Gerrock whom loaned her cameras. Ignatius Wadsworth Brock, whom she called Nate was also a sweetheart. She opened her own photography studio in the shack next to her home on East Front Street in New Bern in 1903.

BW, which her friends called her, opened a second studio in 1913 on Fort Bragg calling it The Photo Hut. Making exclusive images for the North Carolina National Guard. From this she became the first woman in the North Carolina National Guard. In 1920 she moved to Chapel Hill, where she specialized in portrait photography for the Yackety Yack, the yearbook for the University of North Carolina at Chapel Hill, as well as official photography for the Carolina Playmakers (now PlayMakers Repertory Company). She lived in Chapel Hill from 1928 to 1954. The theater work introduced her to the writer Thomas Wolfe, whom she photographed on many occasions.

Wootten once instructed her employee Rudy Faircloth to lower her over a cliff to make a photograph of Linville Falls, a famous natural landmark in North Carolina.

Anthony Lilly is also a New Bern native who is Wootten's biographer and is writing a script for the motion picture about Wootten's life. Lilly is Wootten's leading expert on her life and has the largest collection of Wootten's personal belongings including letter's, thousands of her original prints, glass plates and her entire photographic studio.

Her photographs illustrated six books, including Backwoods America by Charles Morrow Wilson, 1934; Cabins in the Laurel by Muriel Sheppard, 1935; Old Homes and Gardens of North Carolina by Archibald Henderson, 1939; and From My Highest Hill by Olive Tilford Dargan, 1941. Wootten is buried in the family plot in historic Cedar Grove cemetery in New Bern not too far from her old neighbor Caleb Bradham.

== Work ==
Wootten was the first woman to make a photograph from an airplane in 1914, in New Bern, North Carolina. Wootten was also the first woman in the National Guard, making the rank of Adjutant General and Chief of Publicity. Her uncle was North Carolina Congressman, Hap Barden. Wootten utilized Barden's power by providing images she made of a deteriorating Camp Bragg. Her images of soldiers forced to live in the poorest of conditions helped save it from closure. Today, we know it as Fort Bragg.

Wootten's photography illustrated five books during her lifetime, including Charleston: Azalias and Old Bricks, North Carolina Homes and Gardens, and From My Highest Hill. Her images fill UNC at Chapel Hill year books and newspapers, while her larger than life pictorialist photographs line North Carolina State Government building walls and Court Houses. Anthony Lilly, a New Bern native, has written a script which is in pre-production about Wootten's incredible life. Lilly also possess the largest collection of Wootten's images, prints, Glass plates and personal belongings. He also has Wootten's entire 1904-1959 studio contents, including her first camera and all lighting. Lilly will fill the Wootten-Moulton Museum in New Bern North Carolina with these treasures. A book by Jerry Cotton titled Light and Air was a brief description in words and pictures about Wootten.

Lilly's Wootten-Moulton Museum collection holds hundreds of family letters and business papers detailing the working relationship with Caleb Bradham. During his research he also uncovered Wootten's original concept drawings of the famous drink.

In addition to her work as a pioneering photographer and artist, Wootten was a staunch advocate for women's rights and used her standing and reputation throughout the south to aid women's organizations including the Women's Missionary League. In 1915 she became the President of the League's publicity department, creating all official portraits.

Her early client, Lieutenant Gregg Cherry, became North Carolina's 61st Governor. Marine Corps Air Station Cherry Point and Cherry Hospital are named after Cherry.

The Wootten-Moulton Studio received The Showmanship Award from The Walt Disney Company for outstanding achievements in professional photography.

== Awards and exhibitions ==
Wootten received the North Carolina State Award for "Most Beautiful Photographs of Trees in America" from the American Forestry Association in 1934 for her photograph Live Oaks.

Her work has been exhibited at Harvard University, the Century of Progress Exposition, the Academy of Arts in Richmond, Virginia, and in numerous locations in North Carolina.

- 1923, May 3–31: International salon of the Pictorial Photographers of America. Held at the galleries of the Art Center, 65 East 56th Street, New York City, NY.
- 1994: "I won't make a picture unless the moon is right--" : early architectural photography of North Carolina by Frances Benjamin Johnston and Bayard Wootten. North Carolina State University, Visual Arts Center.

== Works ==
- Cotten, Jerry W. (1998) Light and Air: The Photography of Bayard Wootten. North Carolina: The University of North Carolina Press. ISBN 978-0807824450
- Dargan, Olive Tilford (1998) From My Highest Hill: Carolina Mountain Folks. Photographs by Bayard Wootten. Tennessee: University of Tennessee Press. ISBN 978-1572330207
- Henderson, Archibald (1939) Old Homes and Gardens of North Carolina. Photographs by Bayard Wootten. North Carolina: University of North Carolina Press. OCLC Number: 1511096
- Higgins, Anthony (Author), Wootten, Bayard (Photographer) (1939) New Castle, Delaware, 1651-1939. Houghton Mifflin. OCLC Number: 7944271
- Stoney, Samuel Gaillard (Author), Wootten, Bayard (Photographer) (1939) Charleston: Azaleas and Old Bricks. Houghton Mifflin. OCLC Number: 498875680
- Sheppard, Muriel Earley (1935) Cabins in the Laurel. Photographs by Bayard Wootten. North Carolina: Chapel Hill Books ISBN 978-0807819869
- Wilson, Charles Morrow (1935) Backwoods America. Illustrations by Bayard Wootten. Chapel Hill: University of North Carolina Press. OCLC Number: 578736164
- Exhibition Catalog: "I won't make a picture unless the moon is right--" : early architectural photography of North Carolina by Frances Benjamin Johnston and Bayard Wootten, North Carolina State University, Visual Arts Center (1994). Raleigh, NC: Preservation North Carolina. OCLC number: 31321581
- Exhibition Catalog: International salon of the Pictorial Photographers of America : held at the galleries of the Art Center, sixty five East Fifty Sixth Street, New York City : from May third to May thirty-first one thousand nine hundred twenty three. Pictorial Photographers of America (1923) OCLC Number: 56057729
