= Barney Josephson =

American businessman (1902–1988)

- Born: February 1, 1902; Trenton, New Jersey, U.S.
- Died: September 29, 1988 (aged 86); New York City, U.S.
- Other name: Warren Josephson
- Citizenship: American
- Occupations: Nightclub owner, restaurateur
- Years active: 1938–1984
- Era: Jazz
- Known for: Provided venue for Billie Holiday to sing "Strange Fruit" (1939)
- Notable work: Café Society
- Spouse: 4 (last Terry Trilling-Josephson)
- Family: 5 siblings including Leon Josephson

Barney Josephson (February 1, 1902 – September 29, 1988) was the American founder of Café Society in Greenwich Village, New York's first integrated nightclub. Opening artists in 1938 included Billie Holiday, who first performed the song "Strange Fruit" there.

== Background ==
Barney Josephson was born on February 1, 1902, in Trenton, New Jersey, the youngest of six children. His Jewish parents had immigrated from Libau, Latvia in 1900. His mother was a seamstress and his father, who died shortly after Barney's birth, was a cobbler. Two of his brothers, Leon and Louis, became lawyers. Josephson graduated from Trenton High School.

== Career ==
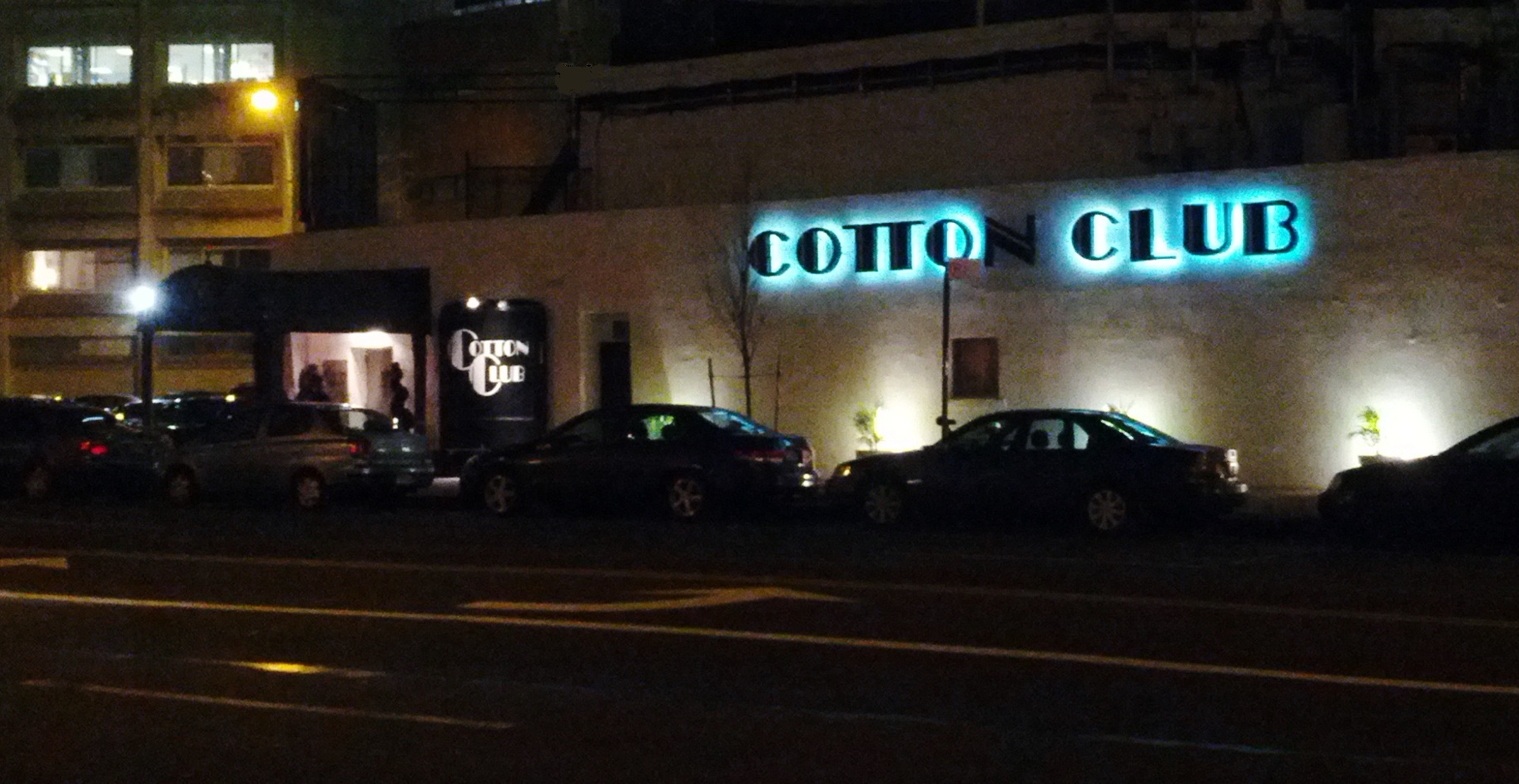
Cotton Club (125th Street in New York City in December 2013) helped inspire Josephson's Café Society.

Josephson then went to work in his oldest brother David's shoe shop. After the store went bankrupt during the Depression, Josephson got a job as a buyer, window trimmer and orthopedic fitter in an Atlantic City shoe store.

Although he had no experience in entertainment or nightclubs, he moved to New York in the mid-1930s with a vague plan to open a club. He was a jazz fan and had visited Harlem's Cotton Club – but, he later said:

One thing that bugged me about the Cotton Club was that blacks were limited to the back one-third of the club, behind columns and partitions. It infuriated me that even in their own ghetto they had to take this. Of course, in any club below Harlem, which had black entertainment, such as the Kit Kat Club, a black couldn't even get in.

He had also become intrigued while holidaying in Europe by the political cabarets of Berlin and Prague.

=== Café Society ===
On December 18, 1938, Josephson opened Café Society with producer John Hammond in a basement room at 1 Sheridan Square (or 2 Sheridan Square), West Village, New York City. When he opened the club, Josephson was in his mid-thirties with no experience in the nightclub or entertainment fields.

He set out to break the norm for nightclubs in the city by making it non-segregated both front of house and behind the scenes, and free of mob influence.

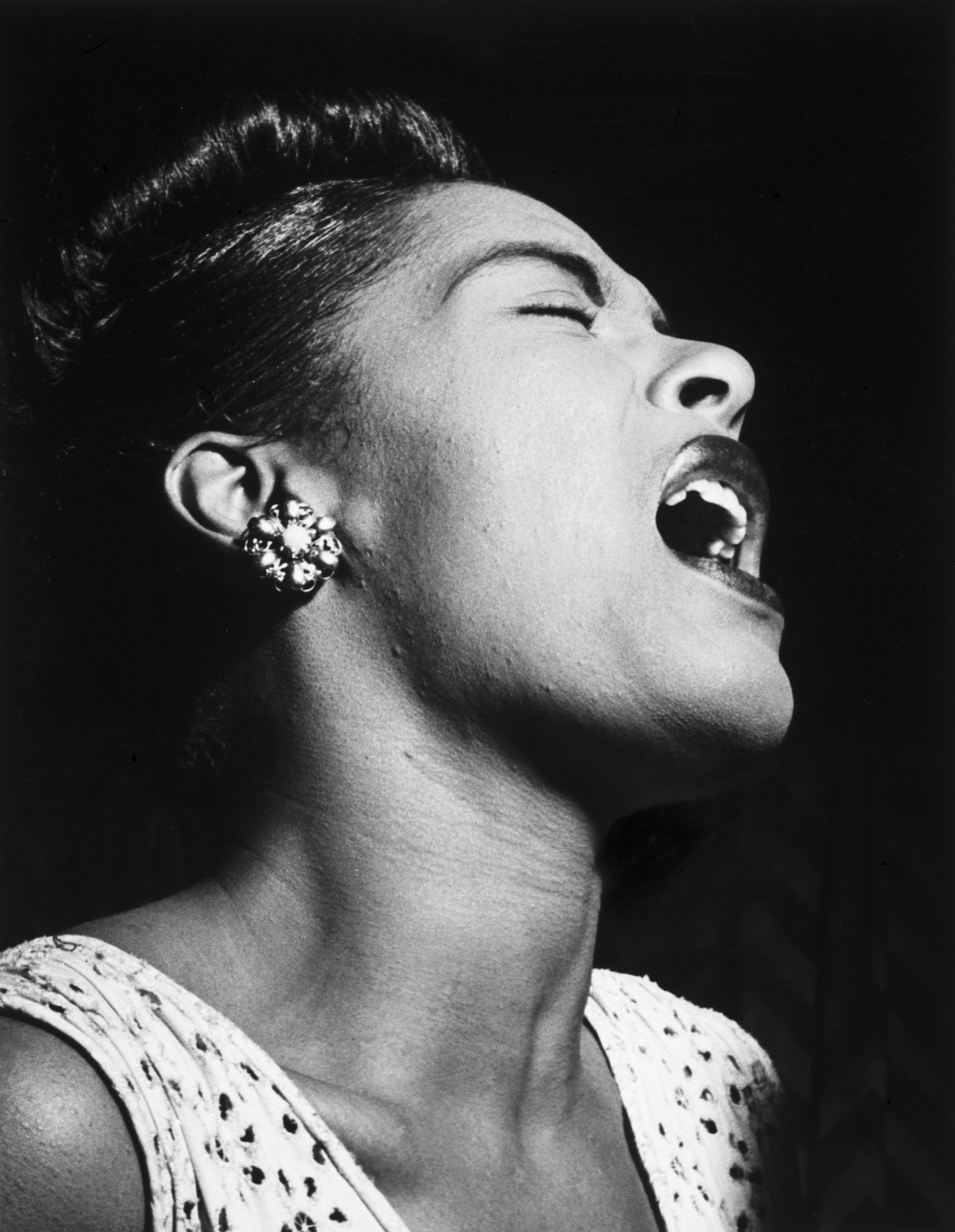
Billie Holiday (circa 1947) at the Downbeat club, New York (February 1947) debuted "Strange Fruit" at Café Society in 1939

Billie Holiday sang in Café Society's opening show in 1938 and performed there for the next nine months. Josephson set down certain rules around the performance of "Strange Fruit" at the club: it would close Holiday's set; the waiters would stop serving just before it; the room would be in darkness except for a spotlight on Holiday's face; and there would be no encore.

He later said:

I wanted a club where blacks and whites worked together behind the footlights and sat together out front... there wasn't, so far as I know, a place like it in New York or in the whole country.

Few nightclubs permitted blacks and whites to mix in the audience. Clubs south of Harlem, like the Kit Kat Club, did not let African Americans enter at all. Segregation in the States was relentless: as Josephson told Reuters in 1984, "The only way they'd let Duke Ellington's mother in was if she was playing in the band."

Josephson's Café Society was the first nightclub in a predominantly white neighbourhood to welcome customers of all races.

Decades later, the UK's Guardian newspaper would state: "The club was the brainchild of New Jersey shoe salesman Barney Josephson: a pithy antidote to the snooty, often racist elitism of other New York nightspots."

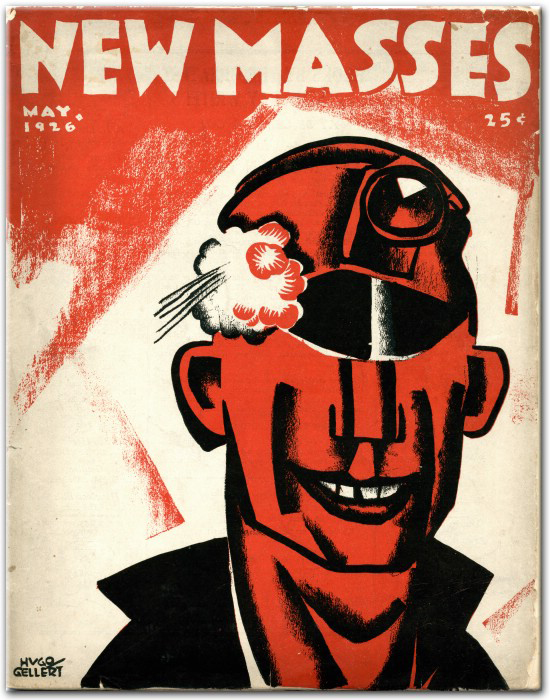
William Gropper's cover for the first-ever issue of the New Masses

Using $6,000 borrowed from two friends of his brother Leon to start the club, he rented a basement on Sheridan Square. He commissioned prominent Greenwich Village artists, including Sam Berman, Abe Birnbaum, Adolph Dehn, William Gropper, John Groth, Syd Hoff, Anton Refregier and Ad Reinhardt, to decorate the walls with murals. He later recalled:

I told them I was going to open a political cabaret with jazz - a satire on the upper classes. "You guys paint anything you want," I said. I told them I'd pay them each $125 and a due bill for another $125 so they could come in and eat and drink any time.

Café Society brought recognition to a number of key jazz performers including Billie Holiday, Teddy Wilson and Alberta Hunter. Josephson's music adviser and talent scout was John Hammond.

In October 1940 Josephson opened Café Society Uptown on East 58th Street, New York.

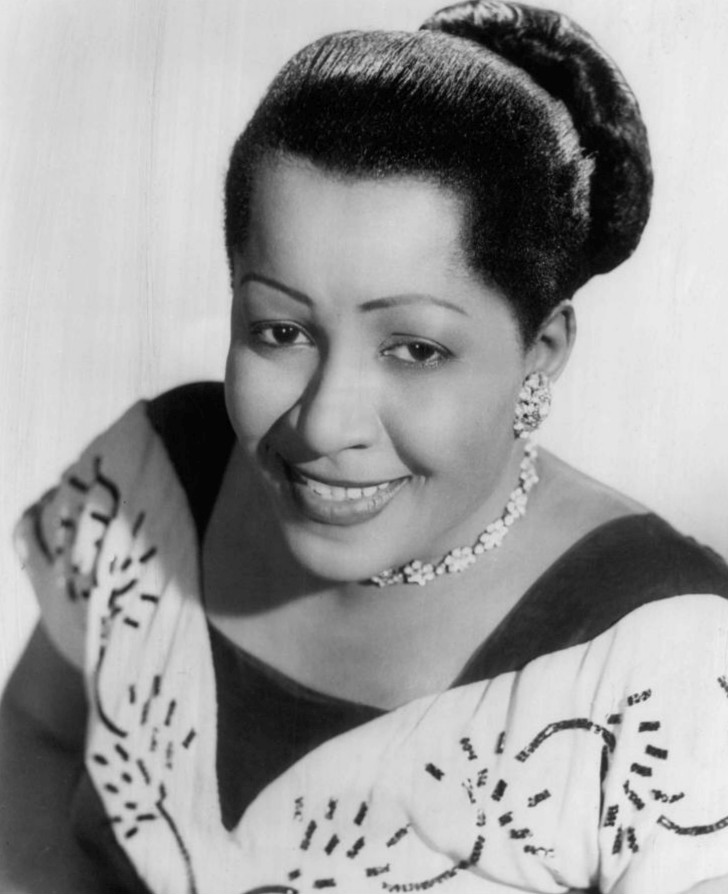
Nellie Lutcher (1950) performed at Café Society

Café Society and Café Society Uptown were consistent nurturers of new talent, supporting and showcasing many singers, jazz musicians, dancers and comedians. Other singers who were featured include Lena Horne, Sarah Vaughan, Nellie Lutcher, Rose Murphy, the Golden Gate Quartet, Sister Rosetta Tharpe, Hazel Scott, Josh White and Susan Reed. "Horne once said that Josephson not only gave her a career but self-respect."

The blues singer Big Joe Turner appeared in Café Society's first show along with boogie-woogie pianists Albert Ammons, Meade Lux Lewis and Pete Johnson and carried on there for four years. Other musicians who played there included Art Tatum, Teddy Wilson, Mary Lou Williams, Red Allen, Joe Sullivan, Edmond Hall and Eddie Heywood.

Dancers Pearl Primus and the Krafft Sisters performed at the two clubs.

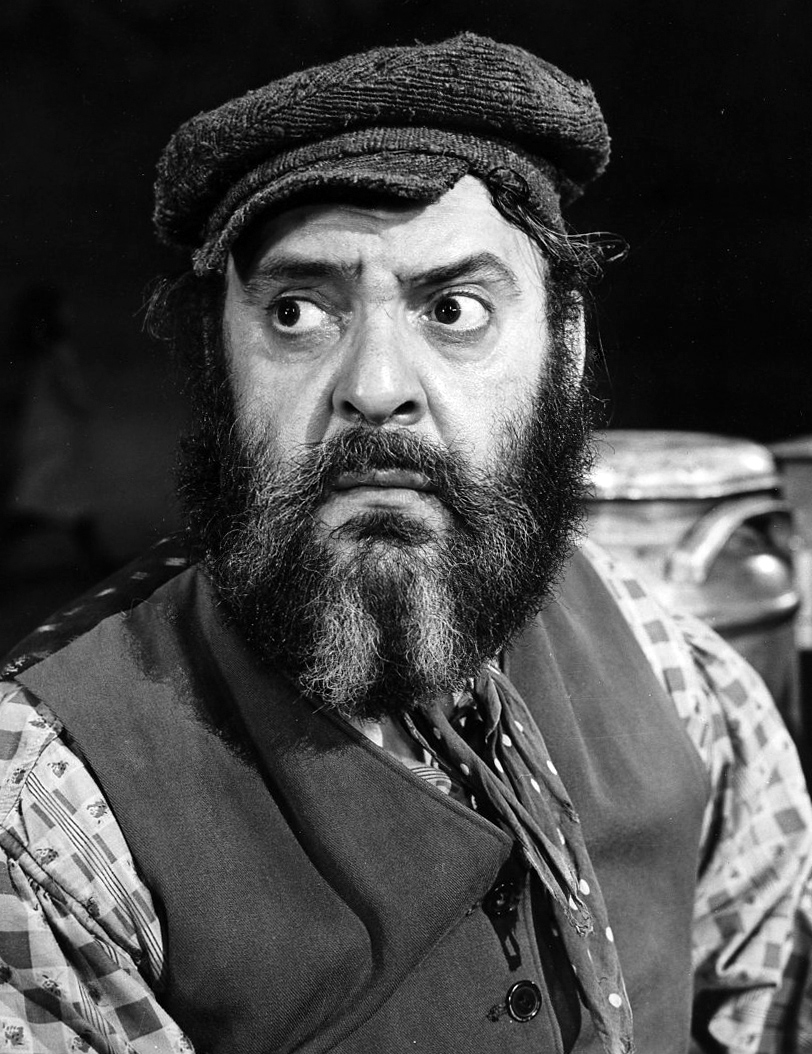
Zero Mostel (in Fiddler on the Roof 1964) got his start with Josephson as a comedian at Café Society

Comedian Jack Gilford was the master of ceremonies in the opening show. He stayed for two years in that role. He was succeeded by Zero Mostel, who made his professional debut at the club. Other comedians who performed there included Imogene Coca, Jimmy Savo, and Carol Channing.

=== House Un-American Activities Committee ===
In 1947, Josephson's brother Leon was subpoenaed by the House Committee on Un-American Activities and found guilty of Contempt of Congress when he refused to answer any questions. As a result, Josephson was attacked by columnists like Dorothy Kilgallen, Lee Mortimer, Westbrook Pegler and Walter Winchell. At the time, Barney Josephson was owner not only of Café Society but also "J. & J. Catering Company." Within weeks of these attacks, business at the two clubs dropped by nearly half. From 1947 to 1949, George Avakian held New York University's first jazz classes at the nightclub. The date of the clubs' closure seems unclear but somewhere between 1948 and 1951.

In 1953, brother Leon Josephson named him "Warren Josephson," at whose "restaurant" he worked.

=== The Cookery ===
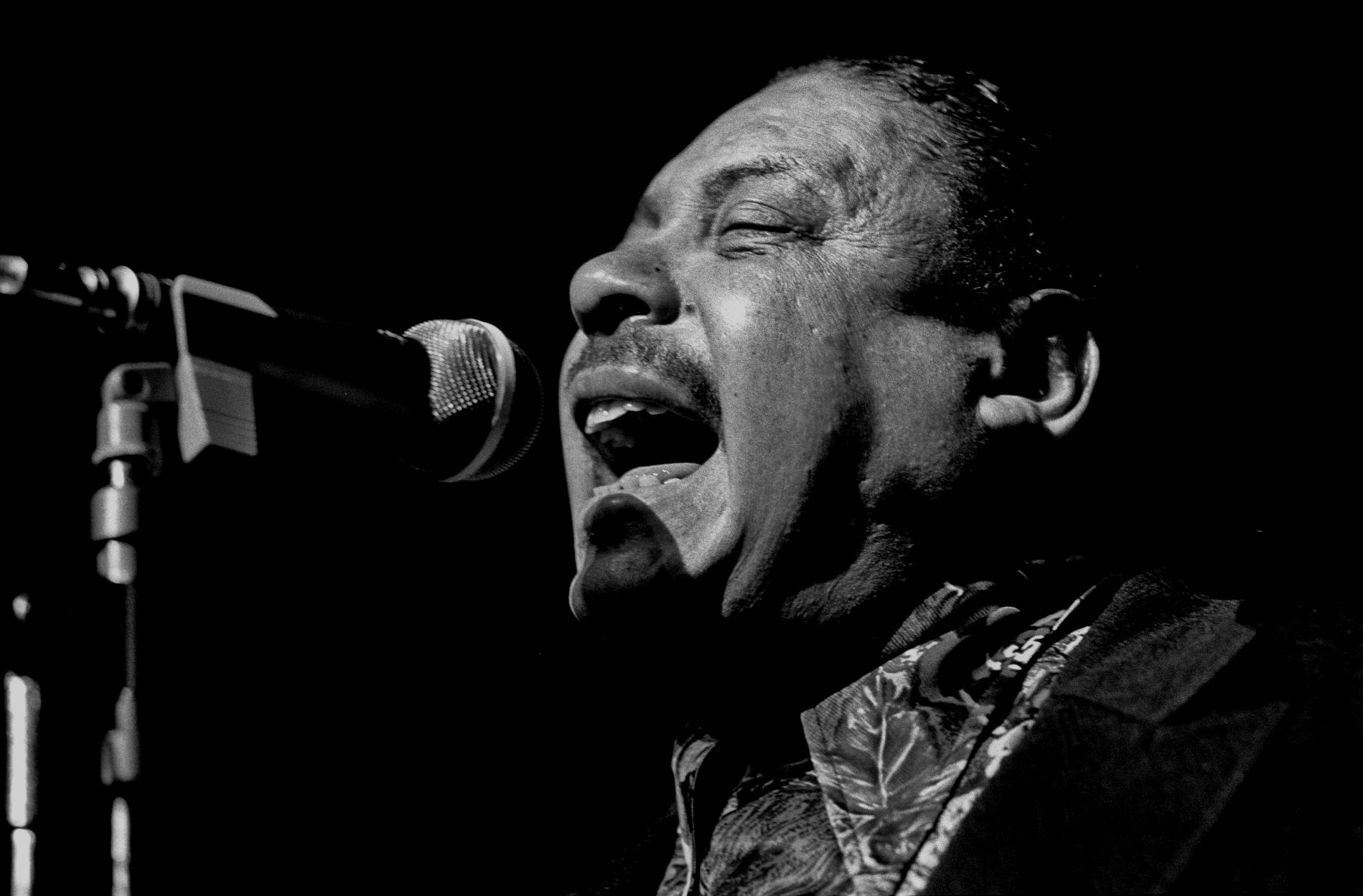
Big Joe Turner (here, performing in Hamburg in 1973) performed in Josephson's establishments for decades

Josephson subsequently opened a small chain of restaurants in New York, the Cookeries. By late 1969, he had reduced the chain to a single restaurant, at University Place and 8th Street in Greenwich Village. He then began to feature live music in the restaurant, starting with the jazz pianist Mary Lou Williams who had played at Café Society. Following Williams, many of those who had once performed at the club subsequently appeared at the Cookery, including the singer Alberta Hunter, Susannah McCorkle, Arthur Tracy, Big Joe Turner, Nellie Lutcher, Eddie Heywood, Teddy Wilson, Rose Murphy, Jimmy Rowles, Sammy Price, Susan Reed, Ellis Larkins, Jack Gilford and Helen Humes. Live music continued there until The Cookery closed down in 1984.

Another artist to appear at The Cookery was singer Lu Elliott, who filled the space left by Hunter after she suffered a fall.

Josephson closed the Cookery in 1984.

== Personal life and death ==
Josephson was married four times. His fourth wife was Terry Trilling-Josephson. He had two sons, Edward and Louis, and a step-daughter, Kathe Trilling.

Josephson died age 86 on September 29, 1988, of internal bleeding in New York City hospital.

== Legacy ==
In 1974, The New York Times credited Josephson's Café Society for launching boogie-woogie in 1939.

In 2013, the show Café Society Swing opened at the Leicester Square Theatre in London, with a subsequent production in 2014 at 59E59 Theaters in New York

== Works ==
- The Famous Cookery Cookbook with Gloria Agrin Josephson (1963)
- Cafe Society: The Wrong Place for the Right People with Terry Trilling-Josephson (foreword by Dan Morgenstern) (2007)
