= Ellen Dawson =

Scottish-American activist(1900 - 1967)

- Born: 14 December 1900; Barrhead, Scotland
- Died: 17 April 1967 (aged 66); Charlotte Harbor, Florida, U.S.
- Occupation: Textile worker

Ellen "Nellie" Dawson Kanki (14 December 1900 - 17 April 1967), best known as Ellen Dawson, was a Scottish-American political activist and trade union organizer in the textile industry. Dawson is best remembered as an active participant in three of the greatest textile strikes of the 1920s; the 1926 Passaic textile strike, the 1928 New Bedford textile strike, and the 1929 Loray Mill strike in Gastonia, North Carolina. An activist in the Communist Party USA during the 1920s, Dawson was the first woman elected to a leadership position in an American textile union.

== Biography ==
=== Early years ===
Ellen Dawson was born on December 14, 1900, in Barrhead, a small industrial town of about 9,000 residents on the outskirts of Glasgow, Scotland. She was the fifth of at least 10 children born to Annie Halford Dawson and Patrick Dawson, a poor working class couple. Her paternal grandparents were indigenous Scots, while her maternal grandparents were Irish emigrants, having left Ireland in the 1840s to escape the Great Famine.

At the time of her birth, Dawson's father worked as an iron foundry worker at Shanks' Tubal Works - a manufacturer of toilets and other bathroom products - in Barrhead. The work was gruelling and pay was based on the piece work system. Her mother was a former power loom weaver in a textile mill.

During the 18th century, Barrhead had been the center of an Owenite utopian cooperative movement — an organization which around the time of Dawson's birth operated 19 businesses and included some 2,100 members — nearly a quarter of the entire community. While no membership records of the Barrhead Cooperative Society are known to exist, and consequently there is no way to either confirm or deny that the Dawson family were members, Dawson's biographer recounts family oral history indicating that they were members of the organization. This would have been an important formative experience in Dawson's life, it is intimated, as the Cooperative was linked to social and educational efforts directed at the children of the community.

=== Scottish years ===
Dawson started work in 1914, probably working in a textile mill as had her mother before her. Although the date of her first employment is known, the exact location and the tasks she performed are not recorded.

While this, with other aspects of Dawson's early years, has been poorly recorded, the political and social environment of so-called Red Clydeside — the region in which she was raised — is a subject of considerable academic research. Historian David Lee McMullen sees this environmental factor as a fundamental component in the understanding of Ellen Dawson:

"Given what we know about Dawson's activities in the United States during the late 1920s — where she was a highly effective labor organizer, known for her courage on the picket line and her fiery oratory — Red Clydeside must have been Dawson's classroom and the activists of the period her teacher. During these years she was introduced to the realities of industrial wage labor, and began formulating her own attitudes and opinions as a worker. During this time Scottish women emerged not only as rank-and-file workers, but as leaders within several major labor confrontation.... Dawson may have only been a silent witness to these events, but it seems impossible to believe that she, or any other young worker of the period, could have escaped the influence of such firebrand rhetoric and monumental events."

The end of World War I brought large-scale unemployment to Glasgow and other manufacturing cities of the United Kingdom, as wartime spending was curtailed. Late in 1919, the Dawson family including Ellen, left the Clyde area in search of employment, heading south to Lancashire, England. The family settled in the village of Millgate, about 15 miles north of Manchester. Dawson found work as a spinner and a weaver in local textile mills, remaining in this capacity until April, 1921.

The unemployment situation in Lancashire proved little better than that of west Scotland, and on April 30, 1921, the 20-year-old Dawson and an older brother departed for the prospect of better opportunities in the United States. They travelled as steerage passengers aboard the SS Cedric, arriving in New York City on May 9, 1921.

=== Labor organizer in America ===
Soon joined by other family members, the Dawson family settled in the mill town of Passaic, New Jersey, making a home in a working-class neighborhood composed largely of European emigrants, a few blocks from the Botany Worsted Mills. For the next five years, Dawson worked at the Botany Mill, a facility in which over 70 percent of the workers earned less than $1200 annually, at a time when it was estimated that $1600 a year was required to support a family.

=== Death and legacy ===
Dawson died at 4 am on April 17, 1967, at her home in Charlotte Harbor, Florida. She was 66 years old. Although the cause of her death will not be released by the state of Florida until 2017, according to family members Dawson had been suffering from "a lung complaint contracted during her years working in the mills." Her published obituary in the local press made no mention of her radical past.

== See also ==
- The Passaic Textile Strike

== Works ==
- "Gastonia," Revolutionary Age [New York], vol. 1, no. 1 (Nov. 1, 1929), pp. 3–4.
- "The Convention of the Textile Workers," Revolutionary Age [New York], vol. 1, no. 6 (Jan. 15, 1930), pg. 10.
