= Loray Mill strike =

1929 strike in North Carolina, USA

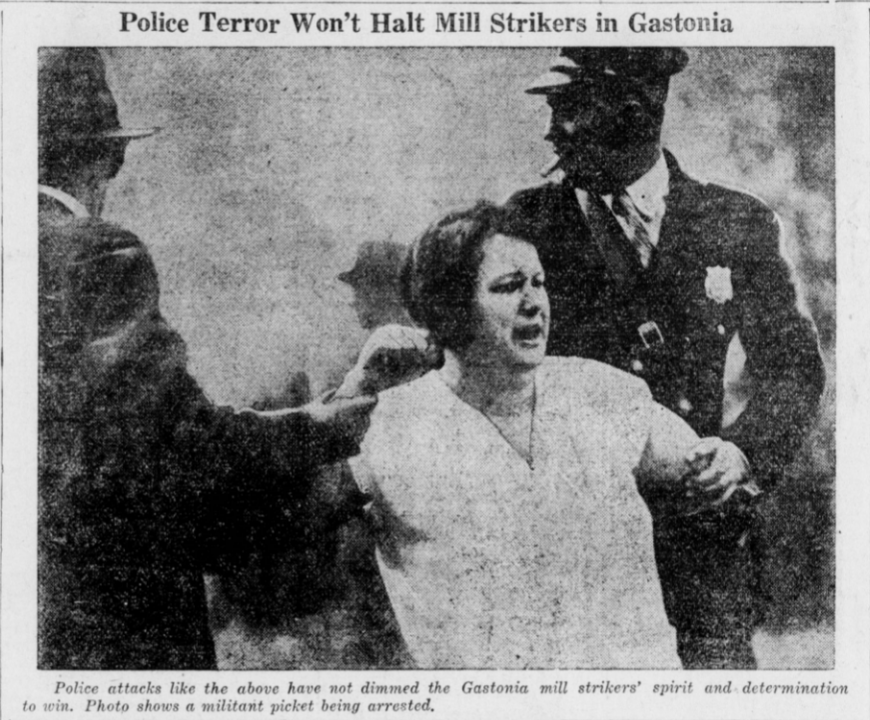
- Date: April 1, 1929 – September 14, 1929
- Location: Gastonia, North Carolina
- Goals: Forty-hour workweek, $20 weekly wage, union recognition, no stretch-out system
- Methods: Striking

Parties
National Textile Workers Union	Vigilante groups Gaston County Sheriff's Department; Gastonia Police Department; NC National Guard

Lead figures
Fred Erwin Beal; Ellen Dawson; Ella Mae Wiggins	Sheriff Aderholt; Mayor Rankin; Gov. O. Max Gardner

Casualties and losses
Deaths: 1	Deaths: 1

The Loray Mill strike of 1929 in Gastonia, North Carolina, was a notable strike action in the labor history of the United States. Though largely unsuccessful in attaining its goals of better working conditions and wages, the strike was considered successful in a lasting way; it caused an immense controversy which gave the labor movement momentum in the South.

== Background ==
Located in the south-western piedmont of North Carolina, Gaston County had the ideal resources for manufacturing. Because of the large potential workforce of former sharecroppers and failed farmers, many northern industrialists moved south in search of a reduced cost of labor. World War I brought great prosperity to the southern cotton mills, "fueled largely by government defense orders for uniforms, tents, and war material. Thousands of new jobs opened in the mills, and wages soared to all time highs." This boom was to be short-lived, however, and the prosperity that the workers enjoyed soon disappeared. The luxury items they had purchased on credit were now stretching their budgets so much that they could hardly afford to put food on the table.

Managers introduced the "stretch-out" system in which spinners and weavers not only doubled their work, but also reduced their wages. "I used to tend forty-eight looms," complained a South Carolina weaver in 1929, "while under the stretch-out I have to tend ninety looms and I couldn't do it. Three years ago I was makin' over $19 a week. Now I make $17.70." "By the late 1920s some mill workers' wages sank as low as $5 a week." The owners of the mills insisted on keeping prices down, which caused mill work to become extremely dangerous and dirty. Often the workdays were so long that the women, who made up a considerable percentage of the workers, were rarely home to raise their children. Upon hearing about the conditions in the Loray Mill, Fred Erwin Beal of the National Textile Workers Union (NTWU), a communist labor union, as well as a member of the Trade Union Unity League, began focusing his attention on the small town of Gastonia.

== Strike ==
On Saturday, March 30, 1929, the union held its first public meeting in Gastonia. Ellen Dawson, co-director of the strike and vice president of the NTWU, urged workers to stand resolute. The "seemingly frail" woman was in fact a "tough, experienced organizer and superb stump speaker." At 3 pm, Beal took a vote and the workers voted unanimously to strike.

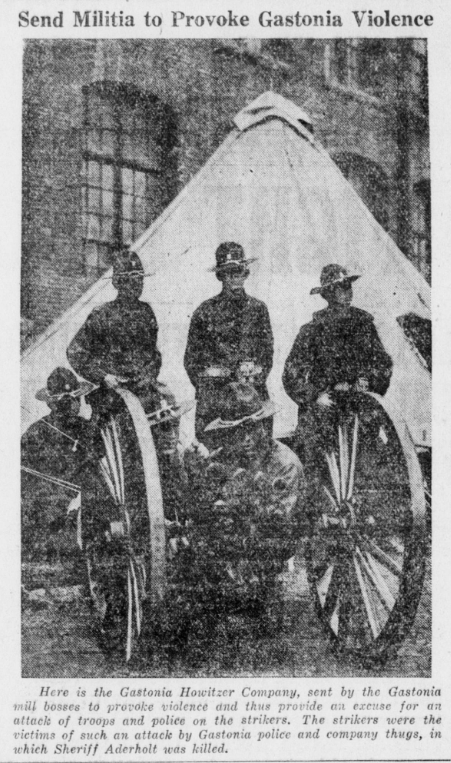
Daily Worker, June 11, 1929

On April 1, 1929 1,800 mill workers from the Loray Mill walked off their jobs to protest intolerable working conditions. The strikers demanded a forty-hour workweek, a minimum $20 weekly wage, union recognition, and the abolition of the stretch-out system.

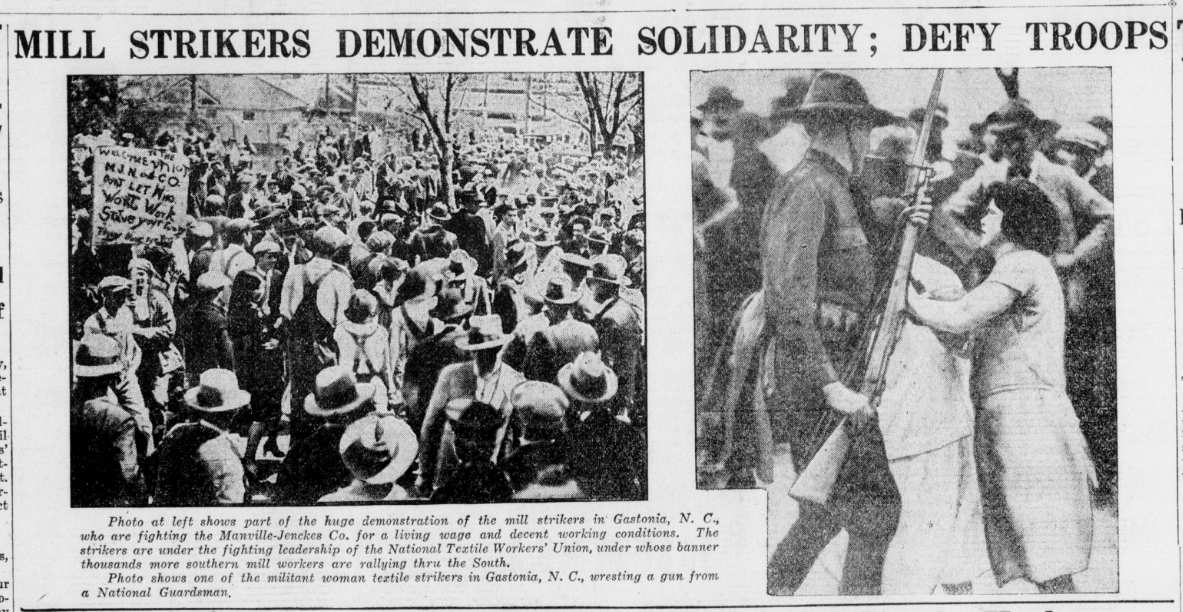
Daily Worker, April 8, 1929

In response, management evicted families from mill-owned homes. In an effort to retain order, Mayor Rankin asked Governor O. Max Gardner for assistance. He immediately sent 250 National Guard troops who arrived on April 3. The strike escalated throughout the month. Nearly 100 masked men destroyed the NTWU's headquarters on April 18, As a result, the NTWU started a tent city on the outskirts of town that was protected by armed strikers at all times.

The situation continued throughout the next few months as the workers continued to strike despite the return to production at the Loray Mill, making their situation appear hopeless. On June 7, 150 workers marched to the mill to call out the night shift. They were attacked and dispersed by sheriff's deputies. Later that night, four officers including Police Chief Aderholt arrived at the tent city and demanded that the guards hand over their weapons. An altercation ensued and Chief Aderholt was killed. Two of his officers and several strikers were wounded.

== Trial ==
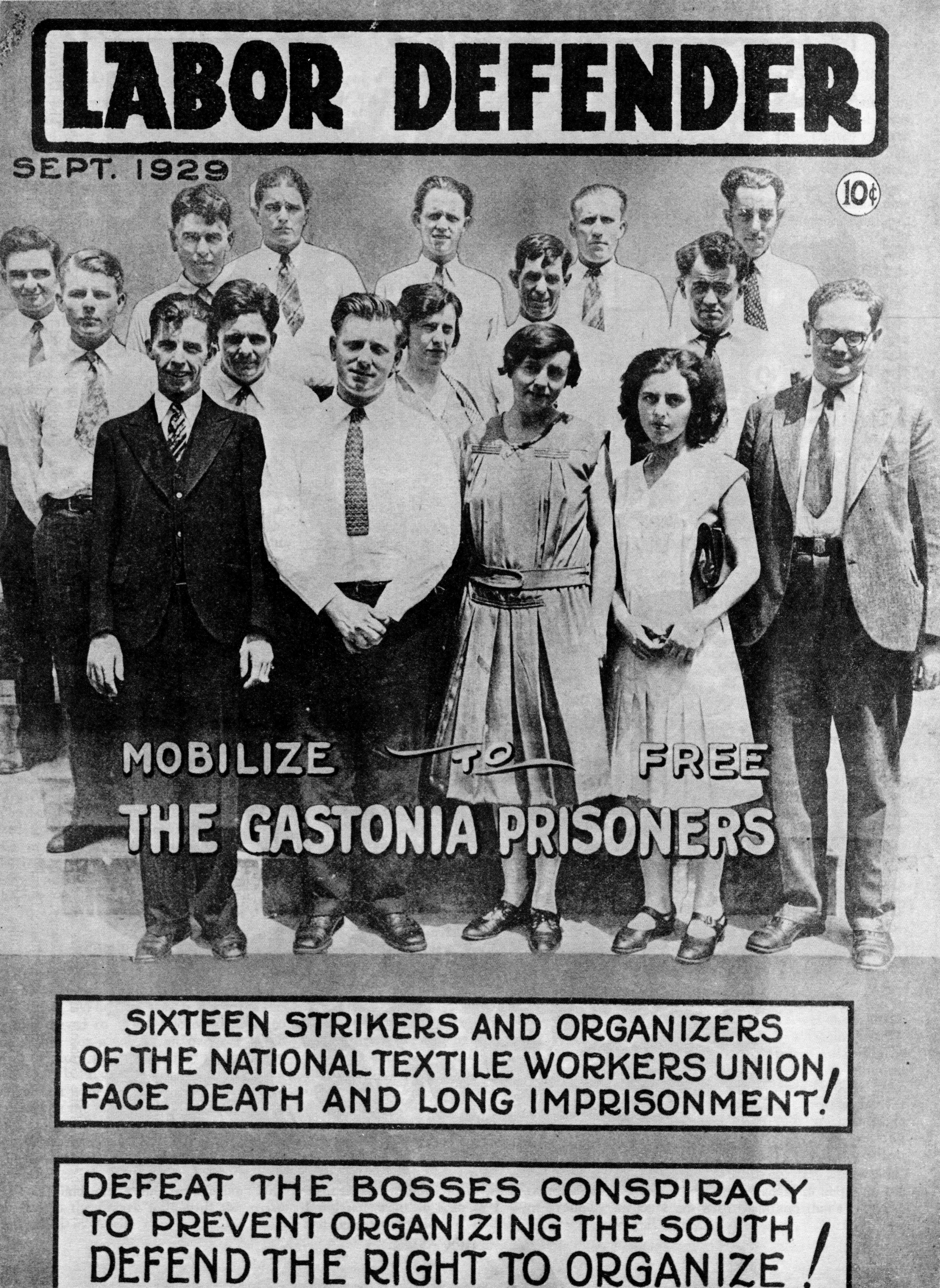
An International Labor Defense magazine depicting the sixteen prisoners

In the aftermath, 71 strikers were arrested. Eight strikers and another eight members of the NTWU, including Beal, Clarence Miller, and Sophie Melvin, were indicted for the murder of Sheriff Aderholt. During the trial, a juror went insane after seeing some disturbing evidence. As a result, the judge was forced to declare a mistrial. When news of the mistrial was released, a general wave of terror ran through the countryside, with the anti-strike "Committee of One Hundred" prominent in the vigilante activity.

The defense team included: Arthur Garfield Hays, who had worked briefly in the Sacco and Vanzetti case, Dr. John Randolph Neal of the Scopes Trial defense, and Leon Josephson of International Labor Defense, the legal arm of the Communist Party of the USA. The prosecutor was Clyde R. Hoey, a brother-in-law of Governor Gardner.

During the early part of September, mobs of men gathered up strikers and ran them out of the county. These actions came to a head when, on September 14, a truck containing 22 strikers was chased down and fired upon. One female striker, Ella Mae Wiggins, was killed.

In a retrial in the Aderholt case, seven men were charged with his murder, six of whom were Loray Mill employees. All were found guilty of second degree murder and sentenced to lengthy terms of imprisonment by Judge M.V. Barnhill.

== Aftermath ==
Beal and Miller were released on bail and fled to the Soviet Union to avoid their prison sentences. (On their ship were American Communist writer Myra Page and her husband John Markey.) Disillusioned by his life in the USSR, Beal subsequently returned to the United States and surrendered to the authorities in North Carolina. He was later pardoned.

== Ella May Wiggins ==
Ella May Wiggins (also known as Ella Mae Wiggins) was a single mother of nine, four of whom died of whooping cough due to inadequate medical care. Rather than renting a mill-owned house in the mill town, she chose to live in a wooden shack in an African-American hamlet called "Stump Town" where her children were cared for by a local African-American woman. Seeing the union as the best hope for her children, Wiggins became a key leader of the strike, and was very successful in rallying the workers through her songs. Some of her better known works are "Mill Mother's Lament", recorded by Pete Seeger, "Chief Aderholt", and "The Big Fat Boss and the Workers". Woody Guthrie referred to her as "the pioneer of the protest ballad". Wiggins went to Washington, D.C., and spoke with senators in the hallways, trying to impress upon them the dire the working conditions of the Southern mills.

On September 14, 1929, following her return to North Carolina, a pregnant Ella May Wiggins was shot in the chest as she rode in the back of a pick-up truck with her brother, Wes, and 2 other men—all headed to a union meeting in Gastonia. Two car loads of armed men pulled the truck over on the bridge leaving Bessemer City for Gastonia. The strike collapsed shortly after her murder.

== Impact ==
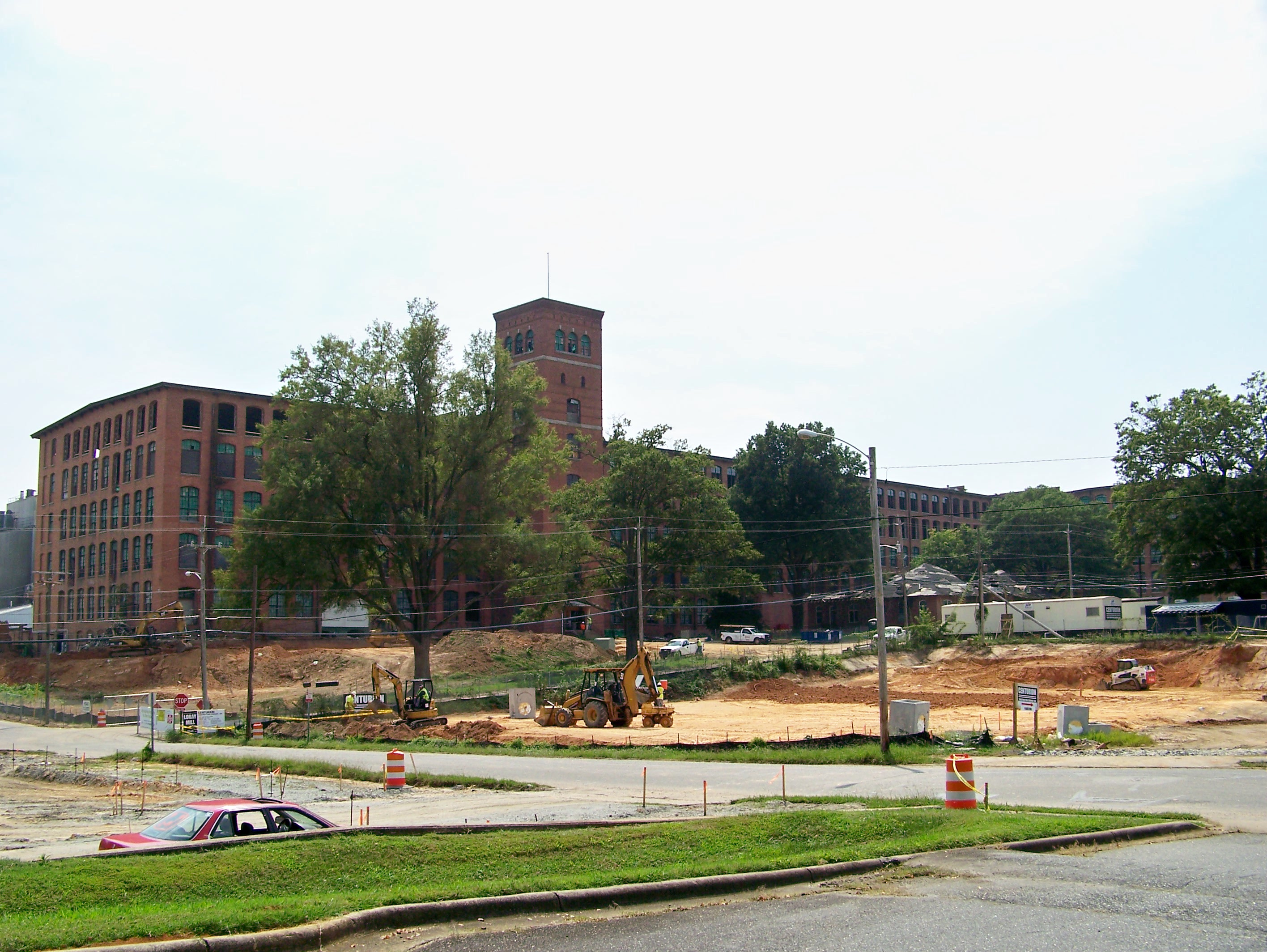
The Loray Mill in 2013

Overall the strike was not a success, but during the same time period there was a series of other textile strikes throughout the South. The main objective of these strikes was the abolition of the stretch-out, and some met with a measure of success. The success was difficult to come by, though, as strikers were branded by the press as "radicals," and labor organizers as "foreign agitators." "Wherever a strike broke out, state troops were immediately sent and to this show of force were added police, deputy sheriffs, and . . . vigilantes." Over time, this spontaneous uprising of textile workers in the South allowed for the formation of the United Textile Workers, the "first significant breach in southern anti-unionism."

== In popular culture ==
=== Gastonia novels ===
Because of the violent and dramatic events surrounding the mill strikes in Gastonia, North Carolina, the labor struggle became a symbol of "the strength, courage, and tenacity" of workers in America. The recognizable incidents taken from actual strikes during the period led to the publishing of no less than seven strike novels within four years. These are commonly referred to as the Gastonia novels:

- Sherwood Anderson: Beyond Desire
- Olive Tilford Dargan: Call Home the Heart
- Fielding Burke (Olive Dargan): A Stone Came Rolling (1931)
- Grace Lumpkin: To Make My Bread (1932)
- Myra Page: Gathering Storm
- William Rollins Jr.: The Shadow Before
- Mary Heaton Vorse: Strike!

"In each of the novels, Gastonia is given as the focus of the universal class struggle, as a set of real events operating within the context of Marxist ideology. . . . The novels take a singular, actual event and offer literary and ideological interpretations which can, in turn, be applied to the reader's own experiences and beliefs." Marxist critics responded favorably to the novels, seeing the strike novel as a way to "deal in one way or another with the literary and philosophical problem of the individual against the collective." Sherwood Anderson received great acclaim for Beyond Desire and the characters' exploitation and suffocation by capitalism. "Grace Lumpkin's To Make My Bread . . . was so well thought of in Party circles that it was awarded the 1932 Gorky prize, while at the same time it received a favorable review in The New York Times." Most critics, however, agree that Olive Tilford Dargan's Call Home the Heart is "by far the best of those [books] on Gastonia. . . . of all the Gastonia novels it most successfully transcends issues of ideology and class to deal with problems of a universal nature." The Gastonia Novels, while well received in their time, were widely read. Some of these titles have been translated into foreign languages; the novel "Strike!" by Mary Heaton Vorse was published in German in 1932 under the title Streik. In more recent years several of them have gained a new popularity for their feminist subtexts and treatment of race and social class. "The strike novels emphasize that no lost strike is ever a complete defeat, just as no strike is ever a complete victory."

=== Later works ===
North Carolina novelist Wiley Cash's 2017 book The Last Ballad is a fictionalized version of the Loray Mill strike.

== See also ==
- Loray Mill Historic District
