= Green Eyes (children's book) =

1954 Caldecott picture book

- Author: A. Birnbaum
- Publisher: Capitol Books
- Publication date: 1953
- Pages: unpaged
- Awards: Caldecott Honor

Green Eyes is a 1953 children's picture book written and illustrated by Abe Birnbaum. The book tells the story of a kitten experiencing each season for the first time. The book was a recipient of a 1954 Caldecott Honor for its illustrations.
