= Ella May Wiggins =

American labor unionist (1900–1929)

- Born: September 22, 1900; Sevierville, Tennessee, U.S.
- Died: September 14, 1929 (aged 28); Gaston County, North Carolina, U.S.
- Cause of death: Gunshot wound
- Occupations: Labor organizer and balladeer
- Children: 9 (5 Surviving)

Ella May Wiggins (22 September 1900 – September 14, 1929) was a union organizer and balladeer who was killed during the Loray Mill Strike in Gastonia, North Carolina.

According to Like a Family, a 1987 account of "the making of a Southern cotton mill world," the Gastonia protest collapsed in the aftermath of Wiggins's death. Her union, the National Textile Workers Union, ultimately was "too weak to challenge the economic and political power of the cotton manufacturers and to organize the labor force."

== Union organizing ==
A native of Sevierville, Tennessee, Wiggins by 1926 settled in Gaston County, NC, living in an African-American neighborhood outside Bessemer City known as Stumptown. Her neighbors would look after her children as she worked as a spinner at American Mill No. 2. According to an article published online by the North Carolina Museum of History, "she worked twelve-hour days, six days a week, earning about nine dollars a week."

She became a bookkeeper for the union, which was Communist run, and traveled to Washington, D.C., to testify about labor practices in the South. She also told her story: “I’m the mother of nine. Four died with the whooping cough, all at once. I was working nights, I asked the super to put me on days, so’s I could tend ‘em when they had their bad spells. But he wouldn’t. I don’t know why. ... So I had to quit, and then there wasn’t no money for medicine, and they just died.”

She also sang her ballads, including her best-known song, “A Mill Mother’s Lament,” which has been recorded by Pete Seeger, among others.

Wiggins believed in organizing African-Americans along with whites, and in a close vote, her local NTWU branch voted to admit African-Americans to the union.

== Death ==
On September 14, 1929, she and some other union members drove to a union meeting in Gastonia. They were met by an armed mob, and turned back. They had driven about five miles toward home when they were stopped by a car; armed men jumped out and began shooting. Wiggins was shot in the chest and killed. Her five children were sent to live in orphanages.

Five Loray Mill employees were charged in Wiggins's murder but were acquitted after less than 30 minutes of deliberation in a trial in Charlotte in March 1930 despite the fact that the crime was committed in daylight and more than 50 people witnessed it. Meanwhile, her fellow NTWU organizer Fred Beal and six other comrades were tried and convicted of conspiracy in the unsolved killing of a local police chief.

Wiggins was buried in the Bessemer City Cemetery. Hers is one of the biggest markers there, after being expanded by the A.F.L-C.I.O. in 1979 to include a marker inscribed, "She died carrying the torch of social justice." Her maiden name is misspelled on the marker at her gravesite.

Three of her children were later buried near her.

== Legacy ==
Wiggins's life and death inspired many works of fiction, including Strike!, a 1930 work by Mary Heaton Vorse, where Wiggins is given the name Mamie Lewis, and The Last Ballad (2018) by North Carolina writer Wiley Cash, which won the Southern Book Prize for Literary Fiction. "Prosperity Mill", by the Swiss-American author Mary Anna Barbey, was originally written and published in French. It is now available in English. The plot follows closely the strike of 1929 in Gastonia and Ella May appears in her own name.
