= Café Society =

Former nightclub in New York City

- Café Society Downtown
- Interactive map of Café Society
- Address: 2 Sheridan Square; New York, New York; 10014; United States
- Coordinates: 40°43′58″N 74°00′07″W
- Operator: Barney Josephson
- Type: Nightclub
- Event: Jazz

Construction
- Opened: 1938
- Closed: 1948

Café Society was a New York City nightclub open from 1938 to 1948 on Sheridan Square in Greenwich Village, managed by Barney Josephson. It was a renowned venue for African American performers.

== Overview ==
Josephson created the club to showcase African-American talent and to serve as an American version of the political cabarets he had seen in Europe earlier. As well as running the first racially integrated night club in the United States, Josephson also intended the club to defy the pretensions of the rich; he chose the name to mock Clare Boothe Luce and what she referred to as "café society", the habitués of more upscale nightclubs, and that wry satirical note was carried through in murals done by Anton Refregier, a Russian immigrant who created the San Francisco Rincon Annex murals.

Josephson trademarked the name Café Society, a phrase coined but not trademarked by Maury Paul, a society columnist who wrote under the pseudonym "Cholly Knickerbocker" for the New York Journal-American. He also advertised the club as "The Wrong Place for the Right People". Josephson opened a second branch on 58th Street, between Lexington and Park Avenue, in 1940. After that, the original club was known as Café Society Downtown and the new club – intended for a different audience – as Café Society Uptown.

Sarah Vaughan at Café Society in 1946; by William P. Gottlieb

The club prided itself on treating black and white customers equally, unlike many venues, such as the Cotton Club, which featured black performers but barred black customers except for prominent black people in the entertainment industry. Café Society featured many of the greatest black musicians of the day, often imposing a strongly political bent. Billie Holiday first sang "Strange Fruit" there; at Josephson's insistence, she closed her set with this song, leaving the stage without taking any encores, so that the audience would be left to think about the meaning of the song. Lena Horne was persuaded to stop singing "When it's Sleepy Time Down South", written by Clarence Muse, Leon René and Otis René; Pearl Bailey was fired for being "too much of an Uncle Tom"; and Carol Channing was fired for an impersonation of Ethel Waters.

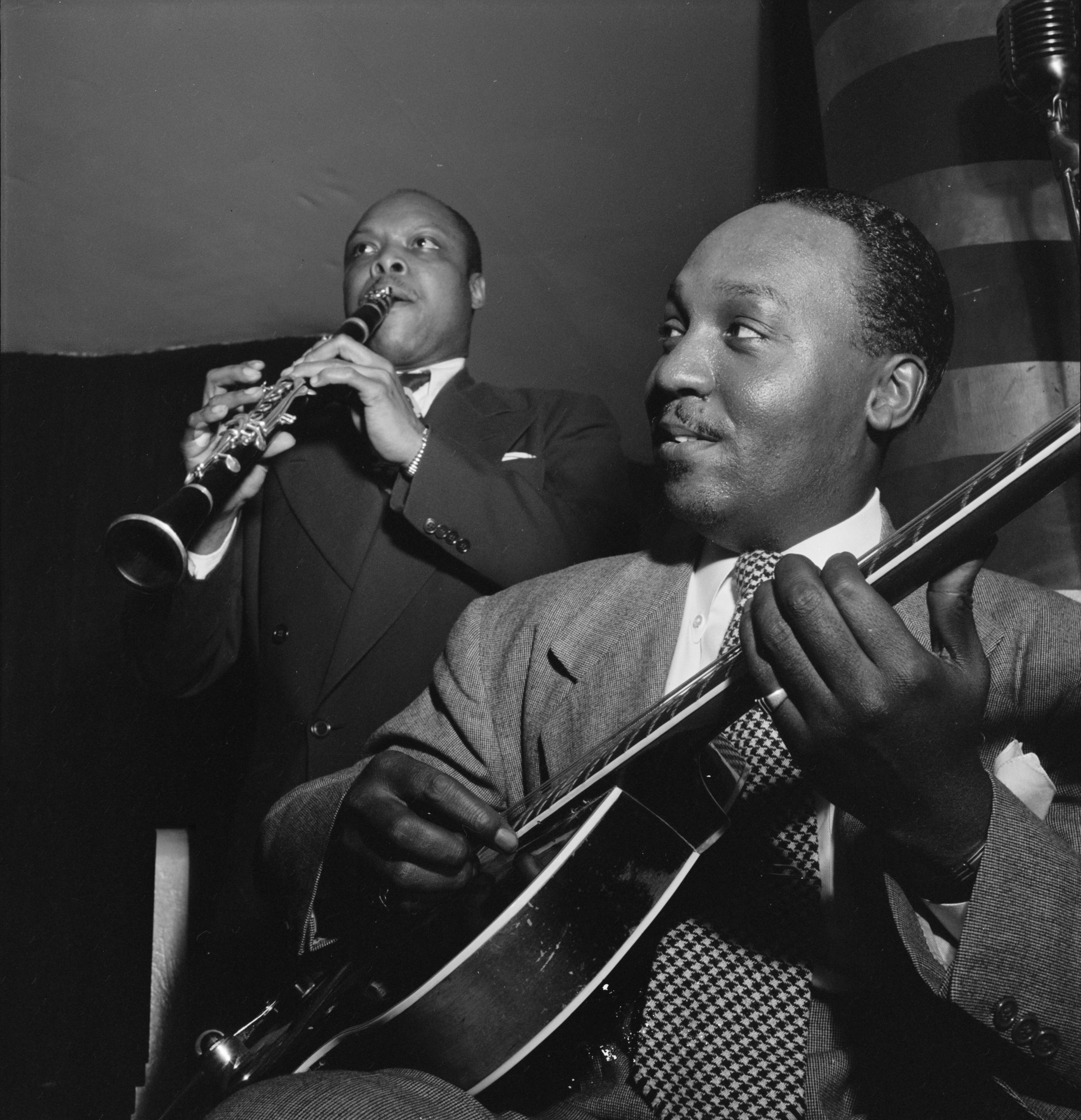
Eddie Barefield (left) and Al Casey at Café Society, c. 1947; by William P. Gottlieb

Relying on the keen musical judgment of John Henry Hammond, the club's "unofficial music director", Josephson helped launch the careers of Ruth Brown, Lena Horne, dancer Pearl Primus, Hazel Scott, Pete Johnson, Albert Ammons, Big Joe Turner, and Sarah Vaughan, and popularized gospel groups such as the Dixie Hummingbirds and the Golden Gate Quartet among white audiences. Many of these acts had first been presented at Hammond's Carnegie Hall concerts, From Spirituals to Swing, in 1938 and 1939. Its defining star in the early 1940s was Josh White, who first appeared there with a gospel group, the Carolinians, then went on to head the bill as a solo performer for four years.

As part of the challenge to integrate America's segregated society, Josephson's club was the scene of numerous political events and fundraisers, often for left-wing causes, both during and after World War II. In 1947, Josephson's brother Leon Josephson was subpoenaed by the House Un-American Activities Committee, which led to hostile comments from the columnists Westbrook Pegler and Walter Winchell. Business dropped sharply as a result, and the club closed the following year.

In summer 1948, the jazz pianist Calvin Jackson played with singer Mildred Bailey and dancer Avon Long. On December 5, 1948, the dancer Pearl Primus closed a successful return engagement before heading off for a year's research in Africa on research as a Rosenwald Fellow.

1940s Manhattan telephone directories list Café Society as "2 Sheridan Square, CHelsea 2-2737". Today, the Axis Theatre Company sits at the former club's location.

== See also ==
- Black and tan clubs
