= Olive Tilford Dargan =

American writer and poet

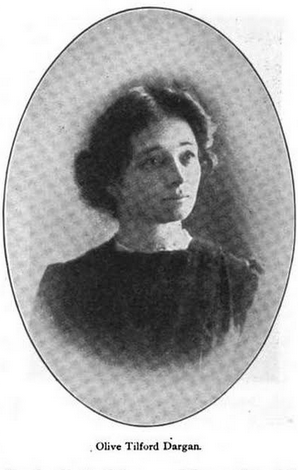
Olive Tilford Dargan, from a 1914 publication.

Olive Tilford Dargan (January 11, 1869 – January 22, 1968) was a writer and a poet. Her early works revolved around mountain poetry. Her works like: The Cycle's Rim, Lute and Furrow, Highland Annals were inspired from her love of mountains and nature. Later in her career, she published novels that focuses on racism, sexism, and fascism through her feminist visions of political activism and romanticism. Her most notable works were Call Home the Heart and A Stone Came Rolling which were written as part of her Gastonia novels.

== Early life ==
Olive Tilford Dargan was born on January 11, 1869, on a farm in Grayson County, Kentucky. She moved to the southern Ozarks with her parents Elisha Frances Tilford & Rebecca (Day) Tilford, around age eleven and started her work in elementary education. She became a teaching assistant at her Parents school until the time that she graduated. Dargan attended Peabody Teacher's College and later Radcliffe College where she met her husband Pegram Dargan, who was a senior at Harvard and a poet. She taught in Arkansas, Missouri, Texas and Canada. In 1898 she married Pegram Dargan. During her time as a writer, Tilford published a number of novels, dramas, and poetry.

Her husband drowned near the coast of Cuba in 1915 and she returned to North Carolina. During that time she published The Cycle's Rim which were poems dedicated to her husband. She won the Southern Society of New York Prize for her work The Cycle's Rim in 1916. She was also awarded the Belmont-Ward Fugitive Prize in 1925. Dargan received an honorary degree in Literature from the University of North Carolina at Chapel Hill in 1925.

Olive Tilford Dargan started her writing career in 1904 when she published poetic dramas and lyric poetry. Her themes heavily revolved around mountains and nature. She traveled extensively and published The Welsh Pony and her first mountain poetry Path Flower and Other Verses in 1906. Her poem Lute and Furrow and The Spotted Hawk both contained her theme on mountains and the beauty of its nature.

== Gastonia novels ==
After a fire at her Round Top home, Dargan moved to Asheville, where she lived in Bluebonnet Lodge, once owned by Rutherford Platt Hayes. Dargan took a pen name and wrote under the name Fielding Burke. She began writing short stories and three other novels as well. Her most notable works were Highland Annals and the Gastonia novels: Call Home The Heart and A Stone Came Rolling. Call Home the Heart and A Stone Came Rolling were influenced by the mountain migrant workers during the 1929 Loray Mill strike in Gastonia, North Carolina.

Highland Annals, based on people Dargan knew when she was a widowed farmer in Swain County, North Carolina, was retitled From My Highest Hill in 1941, and this version included photos by Bayard Wooten.

== Legacy ==
A North Carolina historical marker went up at the West Asheville library in 2000. Bluebonnet Lodge was torn down for office development after Dargan's death in 1968.
