= We Charge Genocide =

1951 petition to the UN accusing the US government of black genocide

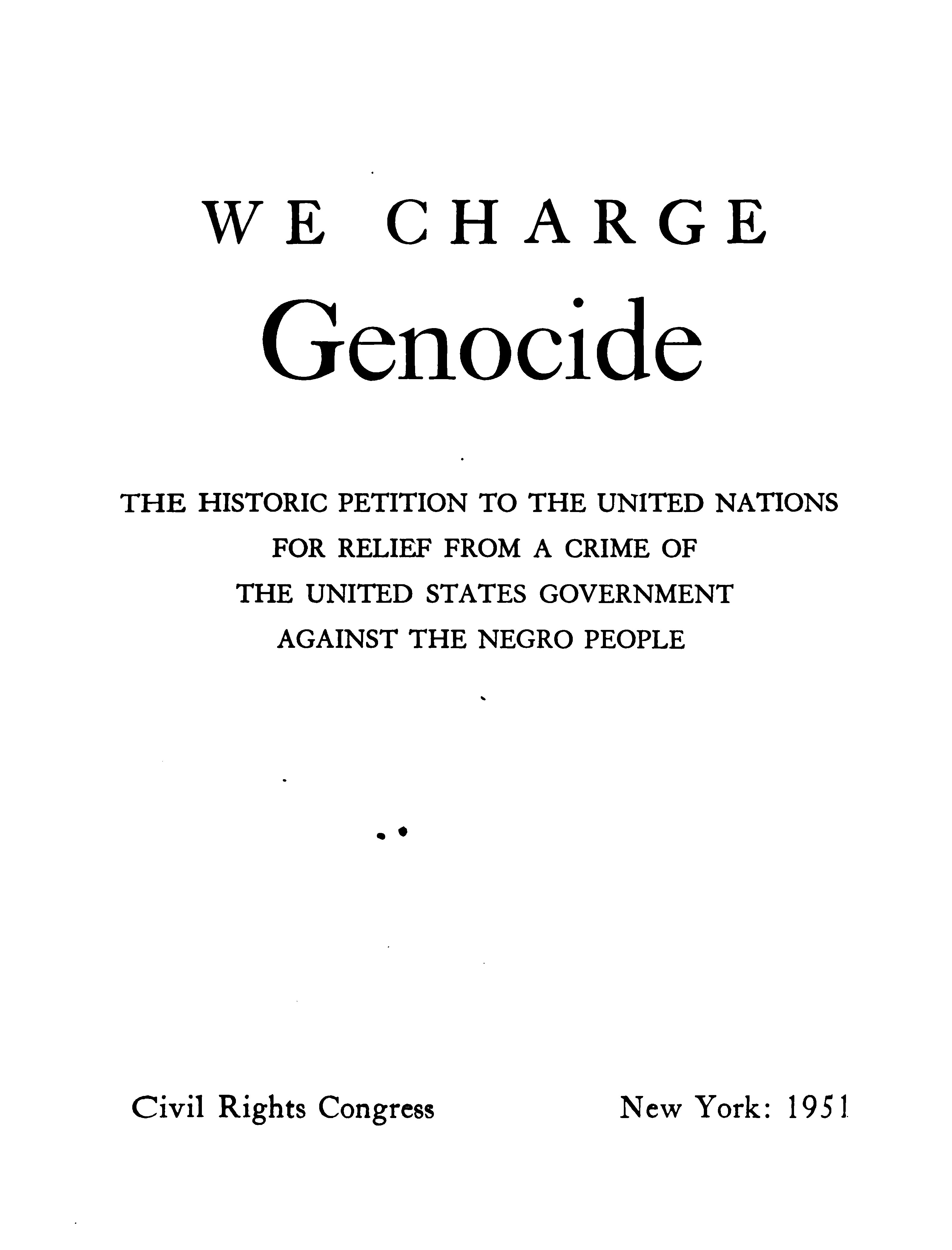
Title page of We Charge Genocide, as published by International Publishers in 1951

We Charge Genocide (Note: Full title: We Charge Genocide: The Historic Petition to the United Nations for Relief from a Crime of the United States Government Against the Negro People) is a petition charging the United States government with genocide based on the UN Genocide Convention. This paper was written by the Civil Rights Congress (CRC) and presented by William L. Patterson to the United Nations at meetings in Paris in December 1951.

The document pointed out that the United Nations Convention on the Prevention and Punishment of Genocide defined genocide as any acts committed with "intent to destroy" a group, "in whole or in part". To build its case for black genocide, the document cited many instances of lynching in the United States, as well as legal discrimination, disenfranchisement of blacks in the South, a series of incidents of police brutality dating to the present, and systematic inequalities in health and quality of life. The central argument: The U.S. government is both complicit in and responsible for a genocidal situation based on the UN's own definition of genocide.

The document received international media attention and became caught up in Cold War politics, as the CRC was supported by the American Communist Party. Its many examples of shocking conditions for African Americans shaped beliefs about the United States in countries across the world. The United States government and press accused the CRC of exaggerating racial inequality in order to advance the cause of communism. The U.S. State Department forced CRC secretary William L. Patterson to surrender his passport after he presented the petition to a UN meeting in Paris.

== Background ==
Soon after the United Nations was created in 1945, it began to receive requests for assistance from peoples across the world. These came from the indigenous peoples of European colonies in Africa and Asia, but also from African Americans. The first group to petition the UN regarding African Americans was the National Negro Congress (NNC), which in 1946 delivered a statement on racial discrimination to the Secretary General. The next appeal, from the National Association for the Advancement of Colored People (NAACP) in 1947, was more than 100 pages in length. W. E. B. Du Bois presented it to the UN on 23 October 1947, over the objections of Eleanor Roosevelt, the widow of the late president and an American delegate to the UN. Du Bois, frustrated with the State Department's opposition to the petitions, criticized president Walter White of the NAACP for accepting a position as consultant to the US delegation; White in turn pushed Du Bois out of the NAACP. The petitions were praised by the international press and by Black press in the United States. America's mainstream media, however, were ambivalent or hostile. Some agreed that there was some truth to the petitions, but suggested that "tattling" to the UN would aid the cause of Communism. The Soviet Union did cite these documents as evidence of poor conditions in the United States. The Civil Rights Congress (CRC), the successor to the International Labor Defense group and affiliated with the communist party, had begun to gain momentum domestically by defending Blacks sentenced to execution, such as Rosa Lee Ingram and the Trenton Six. The National Negro Congress joined forces with the CRC in 1947.

== Contents ==
The petition quotes the UN's definition of genocide as "Any intent to destroy, in whole or in part, a national, racial, or religious group is genocide." It concludes that "the oppressed Negro citizens of the United States, segregated, discriminated against, and long the target of violence, suffer from genocide as the result of the consistent, conscious, unified policies of every branch of government. If the General Assembly acts as the conscience of mankind and therefore acts favorably on our petition, it will have served the cause of peace." The CRC emphasized that attempting to destroy a group "in part" was part of the definition, and argued that treatment of African Americans qualified as genocide.

As evidence, the 237-page petition addresses the question of racism in the United States from different angles. It lists hundreds of wrongful executions and lynchings, refers to at least 10,000 undocumented cases, and also charges that Southern states in the U.S. had engaged in a conspiracy against African Americans' ability to vote through poll taxes and literacy tests. In addition to legal discrimination, the petition discusses systematic economic inequalities and differences in quality of life.

Ultimately, the petition holds the US government responsible for genocide, through endorsement of both racism and "monopoly capitalism" – without which "the persistent, constant, widespread, institutionalized commission of the crime of genocide would be impossible. Seeking to demonstrate the urgency of the problem, and to invite explicit comparisons between American genocide and Nazi genocide, the document focuses on incidents occurring after 1945: "The CRC only focused on incidents of mob violence and police terror since 1945; that is to say, since America proclaimed itself the leader of the 'free world' The charge of genocide, in the wake of the Holocaust, was devastating; it was more wrenching under the klieg lights of the Korean War and American platitudes about democracy. And everyone knew it." The CRC procured source material carefully, and critics of the document acknowledged that its facts were correct. After it became clear that the CRC had, in fact, meticulously verified each incident, White tried another tactic. The 'facts are true' he lamented, but 'like all indictments drafted by a prosecutor', We Charge Genocide is one-sided ...." The CRC sought to demonstrate that systematic oppression of African Americans amounted to genocide because it reflected a violent white supremacy at the core of American culture.

== Delivery ==
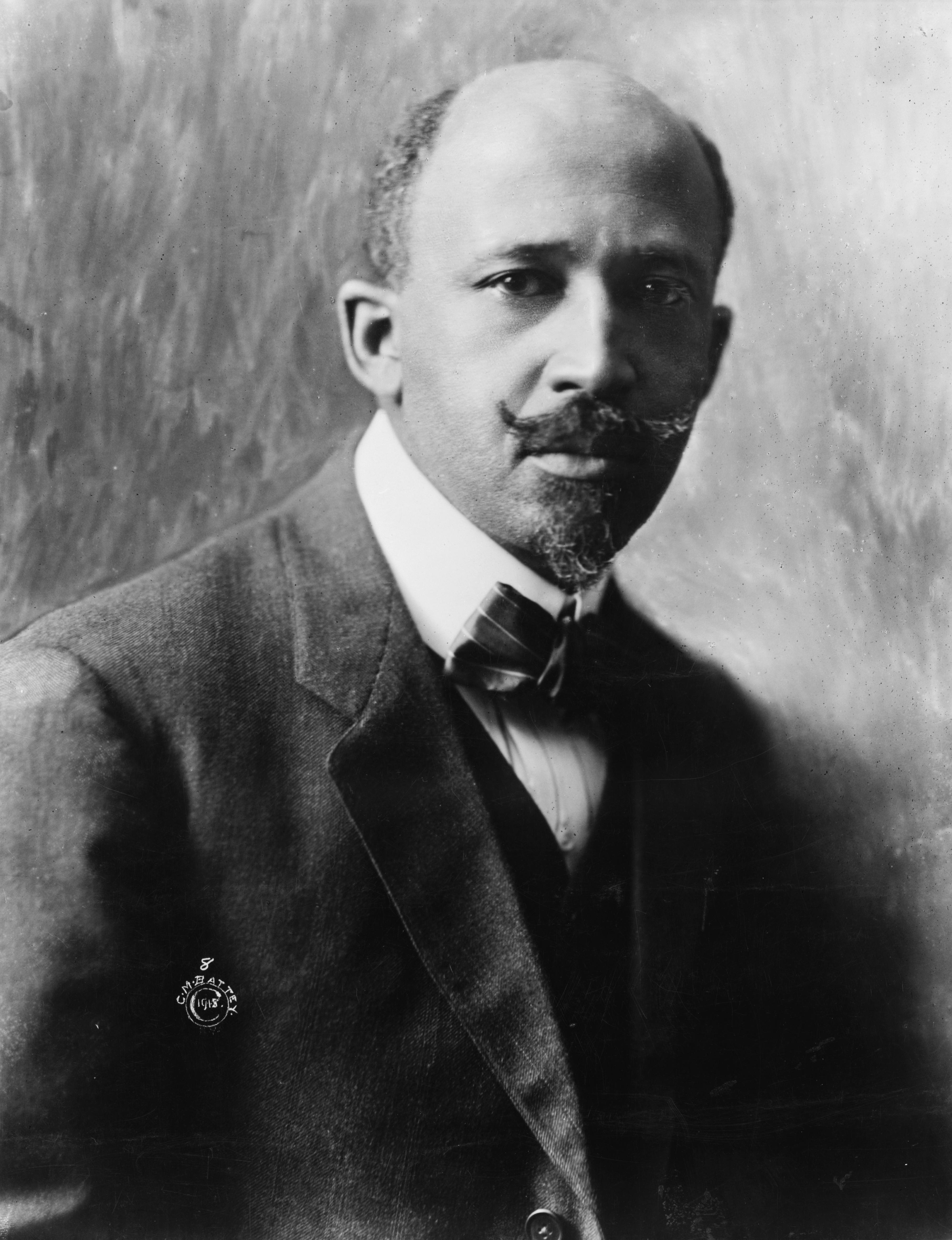
W. E. B. Du Bois was one of the signatories of the We Charge Genocide paper.

On 17 December 1951, the petition was presented to the United Nations by two separate venues: Paul Robeson, concert singer and activist, together with people who signed the petition, handed the document to a UN official in New York City, while William L. Patterson, executive director of the Civil Rights Congress, delivered copies of the petition to a UN delegation in Paris. W. E. B. Du Bois, also slated to deliver the petition in Paris, had been classified by the US State Department as an "unregistered foreign agent" and was deterred from traveling. Du Bois had previously had an expensive legal battle against the Justice Department.

The 125 copies Patterson mailed to Paris did not arrive, allegedly intercepted by the US government. But he distributed other copies, which he had shipped separately in small packages to individuals' homes.

The document was signed by many leading activists and family of Blacks who had suffered in the system, including:

- W. E. B. Du Bois, African-American sociologist, historian and Pan-Africanist activist
- George W. Crockett, Jr., African-American lawyer and politician
- Benjamin J. Davis, Jr., African-American lawyer and Communist New York councilman
- Ferdinand Smith, Communist labor activist and co-founder of the National Maritime Union
- Oakley C. Johnson, Communist activist
- Aubrey Grossman, labor and civil rights lawyer
- Claudia Jones, Communist and Black nationalist activist
- Rosalee McGee, the widow of Willie McGee, who in 1951 was executed after being controversially convicted of rape by an all-white jury
- Josephine Grayson, the widow of Francis Grayson, one of the "Martinsville Seven", who in 1951 were executed in Virginia after a much-publicized trial and conviction by an all-white jury
- Amy and Doris Mallard, family of Robert Mallard, lynched in 1948 for voting
- Paul Washington, veteran on death row in Louisiana
- Wesley R. Wells, prisoner in California facing execution for throwing a cuspidor at a guard
- Horace Wilson, James Thorpe, Collis English, and Ralph Cooper, four of the Trenton Six
- Leon Josephson, Communist attorney who was imprisoned for contempt of the House Un-American Activities Committee (HUAC)

Patterson said he was ignored by US ambassador Ralph Bunche and delegate Channing Tobias, but that Edith Sampson would talk to him.

Patterson was ordered to surrender his passport at the United States embassy in France. When he refused, U.S. agents said they would seize it at his hotel room. Patterson fled to Budapest, where through the newspaper Szabad Nép he accused the U.S. government of attempting to stifle the charges. The U.S. government ordered Patterson to be detained when he passed through Britain and seized his passport when he returned to the United States. As Paul Robeson had been unable to obtain a passport at all, the difficulty these two men faced in traveling led some to accuse the United States government of censorship.

== Reception ==
We Charge Genocide was ignored by much of the mainstream American press. One exception, the Chicago Tribune, called it "shameful lies" (and evidence against the value of the Genocide Convention itself). I. F. Stone was the only white American journalist to write favorably of the document. The CRC had communist affiliations, and the document attracted international attention through the worldwide communist movement. Raphael Lemkin, who invented the term "genocide" and advocated for the Genocide Convention, disagreed with the petition because the African-American population was increasing in size. He accused its authors of wishing to distract attention from the genocides in the Soviet Union, which had resulted in millions of deaths, because of their communist sympathies. Lemkin accused Patterson and Robeson of serving foreign powers. He published an op-ed in The New York Times arguing that African-Americans did not experience the "destruction, death, annihilation" that would qualify their treatment as genocide.

The petition was particularly well received in Europe, where it received abundant press coverage. We Charge Genocide was popular almost everywhere in the world except in the United States. One American writer traveling India in 1952 found that many people had become familiar with the cases of the Martinsville Seven and Willie McGee through the document.

The American delegation heavily criticized the document. Eleanor Roosevelt called it "ridiculous". Black delegates Edith Sampson and Channing Tobias spoke to European audiences about how the situation of African Americans was improving.

At the request of the State Department, the NAACP drafted a press release repudiating We Charge Genocide, calling it "a gross and subversive conspiracy". However, upon hearing initial press reports of the petition and the expected NAACP response, Walter White decided against issuing the release. He and the board decided that the petition did reflect many of the NAACP views. For instance, the organization had long been publishing the toll of blacks who had been lynched. "How can we 'blast' a book that uses our records as source material?" asked Roy Wilkins.

The CRC's power was already declining due to accusations of Communism during the Red Scare, and it disbanded in 1956.

The United Nations did not acknowledge receiving the petition. Given the strength of U.S. influence, it was not really expected to do so.

== Legacy ==
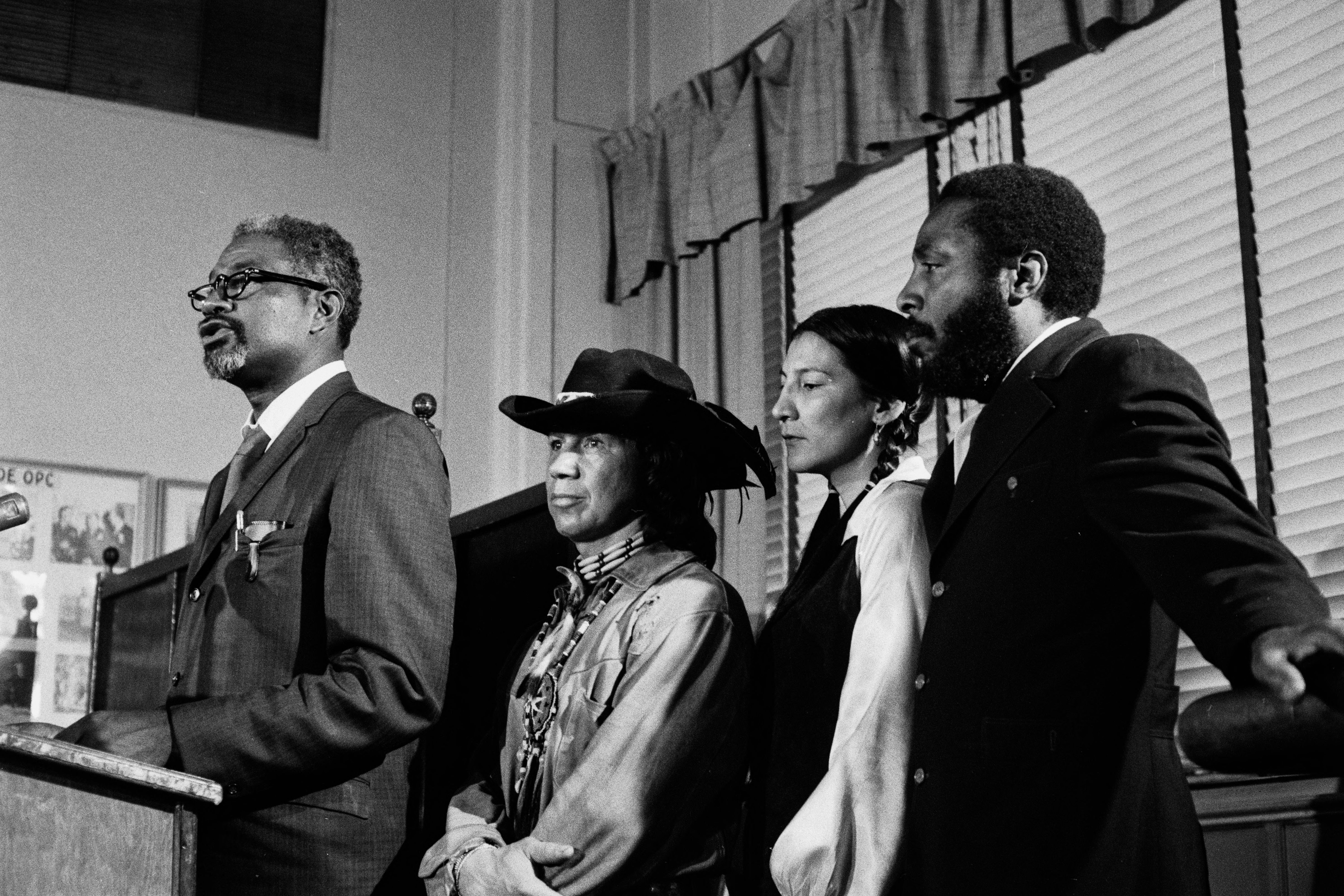
Ossie Davis (far left), Dick Gregory (far right) and others at a press conference charging the United States with genocide, June 18, 1970

The document has been credited with popularizing the term "genocide" among Black people for their treatment in the US. After renewed interest generated by Malcolm X and the Black Panther Party, We Charge Genocide was republished in 1970 by International Publishers. Allegations of genocide were renewed in relation to the disproportionate effects of crack cocaine and HIV/AIDS in the black communities in the United States. The National Black United Front petitioned the United Nations in 1996–1997, directly citing We Charge Genocide and using the same slogan.

Their petition begins:

Declaration of Genocide by the U.S. Government Against the Black Population in the United States.

Whereas, we the undersigned people of African ancestry understand that the proliferation of the distribution and sale of crack cocaine...has reached epidemic proportions, causing serious harm to the African community in the United States. Therefore, we understand that this harm can only be described as acts of genocide by the United States government through its Central Intelligence Agency.

In addition to acts of genocide perpetuated through the CIA and in this recent revelation, acts of genocide can also be attributed to the Government's use of taxpayers' resources to wage war on a segment of the U.S. population. This is evidenced by the following: (1) cutting back on welfare; (2) privatization of public housing and land grab schemes; (3) privatization of public education; (4) racist immigration policies; (5) privatization of basic health care; (6) building prisons and the expanding incarceration of millions of African and Latino youth.

The high rate of incarceration of minorities is another American phenomenon sometimes connected to the word "genocide". Disproportionate application of the death penalty to blacks convicted of the same crime as whites has also been cited, as it was in the 1946–1951 era by the CRC. The United Nations, anthropologists, and mass media have generally not applied the term after 1945 to the internal affairs of Western states.

The petition also represented one of the first high-profile uses of the modern concept of "racism", framed in relation to the eugenic ideology of the reviled Nazis.

We Charge Genocide was used as an example of how the Genocide Convention could be used against the United States. The convention remained unpopular with the United States government and was not ratified until 1986.

During the United Nations Convention against Torture Committee Review of the U.S. in November 2014, a group of eight young activists from Chicago, Illinois, (Breanna Champion, Page May, Monica Trinidad, Ethan Viets-VanLear, Asha Rosa, Ric Wilson, Todd St. Hill, and Malcolm London) submitted a shadow report using the name We Charge Genocide. Their report addressed police brutality toward blacks in Chicago, the lack of police accountability, and the misuse of tasers by the Chicago Police Department.
