= Rosalee McGee =

Historical figure

Rosalee McGee, born Rosetta Saffold, presented herself as the wife of Willie McGee who was executed following his controversial conviction for the rape of a white woman. She represented herself as his wife and the mother of their children, a falsehood that was uncovered after the execution of Willie McGee. During the appellate process, Rosetta falsely accused McGee's accuser, Willette Hawkins, of raping McGee by forcing him into a sexual relationship. (Note: Saffold presented herself as Rosalee McGee during and after the trial, though it was later discovered that she was not the wife of Willie McGee. This Wikipedia article refers to her as Saffold.)

== Early life ==
Saffold was born on April 1, 1919, in Holmes County, Mississippi to parents, Henry Saffold and Nancy Williams. She married at the age of twenty-two to a Lexington man named George Gilmore Jr. on December 13, 1941.

== Presenting herself as Willie McGee’s wife ==
Saffold presented herself as the wife of Willie McGee who was on trial for the alleged rape of Wiletta Hawkins, a white woman in Laurel, Mississippi. This falsehood was uncovered by the author Alexander S. Heard while he was conducting research for his 2010 book.

Between 1941 and 1951, Saffold appeared under the name Rosalee McGee in newspaper articles where she was described as a “loyal wife” and “selfless mother” of four children. Appearing as McGee, Saffold spoke to inform the public about McGee’s case and advocate for his release. These speaking engagements were primarily funded by the Civil Rights Congress (CRC). The speeches started in June 1950 at a peace rally in Madison Square Garden, and resonated with black southerners who related to Willie’s story of injustice in the hands of white supremacy.

During the trial, where Saffold continued to represent herself as McGee's wife, she presented a sworn affidavit against Mrs. Hawkins in which she stated that Willie and Mrs. Hawkins engaged in a consensual extramarital affair. In her statement, Saffold supported Willie’s allegation that Mrs. Hawkins had relentlessly pursued him and detailed Mrs. Hawkins’s frequent inappropriate pursuits of Willie, including how she once accosted them both on the streets of Laurel.

While Willie was in jail, Saffold wrote letters to him and the Civil Rights Congress, advocating for his innocence. Her first letter, written in mid-1949, said: “I am the wife of Willie McGee who have been behind iron bars since Nov. 1945. We have four children and no one to help me with them and I have been very quite until he get this last sentence in April. I am a poor colored woman and I need my husband with these four kids to help me having to send two away to Neb. and I wont to no will he go to the chair on June 3. Please save him for me.”

After this initial letter, Saffold began a diligent correspondence with the Civil Rights Congress, informing them of his condition in jail and asking for subsistence money for herself and her children. Many letters were exchanged with Lottie Gordon, a woman who ran the Civil Rights Congress’s prisoner’s relief committee. In one letter that Saffold wrote to the Civil Rights Congress head, William L. Patterson, she wrote, "The jailer said if I ever come over there, he was going say something to me so he could beat hell out of me and lock me up." In response to these challenges, Saffold refused to back down, stating, "My job is not done and if I begin to run, I can't fight." Saffold also alleged that her association with Willie made it difficult for her to get a job, a condition she described in a 1950 letter to Gordon: "Soon as the Lady found out I was willie wife she didn't wont me to get of to go see him."

Throughout Willie’s imprisonment, Saffold remained by his side, vowing, "I'm going to keep fighting till my blood runs like water." In his final letter, Willie wrote, "Dearest Wife: I no you have done everything there is to do and I apraciate you courage… don't worry honey take care of the children,” and signed it, "Yours truly husband Willie McGee."

== Later life ==
Following Willie’s execution, Saffold remained an advocate for civil rights and continued to speak at events sponsored by the Civil Rights Congress. Saffold also took part in the committee that initiated the Sojourners for Truth and Justice, a civil rights organization formed specifically to support the advancement of black women. In 1952 Saffold spoke to a crowd of 1,400 people at the Civil Rights Congress-sponsored “Rally Against Genocide” in Harlem, during which she revealed that she had watched the execution while surrounded by a mob of people cheering the execution on. This angered Saffold, who said, “I couldn’t cry. Instead I got mad. And everyday I’ve gotten a little madder. Now I know mourning is not enough. I’ve got to keep on fighting.”

== Uncovering the falsehood ==
While meeting with Willie McGee’s grandchildren in an effort to learn more about the case, the author Alexander Heard was shown photographs of a light-skinned black woman, whom the relatives informed him was their grandmother, or the mother of Willie’s children. The woman’s name was Eliza Jane Patton McGee, not Rosalee. Further investigation revealed that Eliza and all of Willie’s children left Mississippi immediately following their father’s arrest, which meant that the woman who presented herself as Rosalee McGee, was neither his wife nor the mother of his children.

Heard realized that many people knew of this deception, including the Civil Rights Congress. By 1950, even Mississippi newspapermen were aware that there were two women in Willie’s life. One idea posed by relatives was that they wanted a "prettier picture, probably, of Willie" as a "married man with children, something to pull for sympathy."

== Legacy ==
While Saffold was presenting herself as McGee's wife, she met the poet Beah Richards, and Richards included the figure of Rosalee McGee in her poem A Black Woman Speaks.
