= Ishmael Flory =

American activist (1907–2004)

Ishmael Flory (July 4, 1907 – February 4, 2004) was an American civil rights activist, trade union organizer, and communist party (CPUSA) leader in Illinois.

== Biography ==
Ishmael was the youngest of nine children born to Samuel and Leola Hancock Flory in Lake Charles, Louisiana. In 1918, the Flory family moved to Los Angeles, where Ishmael graduated from Jefferson High School. Flory entered the University of California, Los Angeles in 1927. After taking a few years off to work, he received his degree from University of California, Berkeley in 1933.

== Civil rights activism ==
After graduation from U.C. Berkeley, Flory accepted a fellowship from the Fisk University masters program in sociology. While a graduate student at Fisk, he was involved in protesting the lynching of Cordie Cheek, a Nashville teenager. He was asked to leave the university after organizing a protest against Jim Crow policies. This episode was recounted in an essay written by Langston Hughes in 1934:

I see in our papers where Fisk University, that great center of Negro Education and of Jubilee fame, has expelled Ishmael Flory, a graduate student from California on a special honor scholarship, because he dared organize a protest against the University singers appearing in a Nashville Jim Crow theater where colored people must go up a back alley to sit in the gallery. Probably also the University resented his organizing, through the Denmark Vesey Forum, a silent protest parade denouncing the lynching of Cordie Cheek, who was abducted almost at the very gates of the University. —Langston Hughes, Cowards from the Colleges

In 1939 Flory moved to Chicago, where he became head of Joint Council of Dining Car Employees, organizer for the Mine, Mill and Smelter Workers and president of Chicago chapter of the National Negro Congress. In the 1940s and 1950s, he worked with many civil rights activists, including Paul Robeson, W. E. B. Du Bois and William L. Patterson. He was one of many activists to help integrate major league baseball.

In the 1960s, Flory co-founded the African American Heritage Association. Flory was a member of Alpha Phi Alpha fraternity.

== Political life ==
Flory had been a member of the Communist Party since the 1930s, and was the head of the CPUSA in Illinois. He ran for Governor of Illinois on the CPUSA ticket in 1972 and 1976, and ran for U.S. Senate in 1974 and 1984.

Commonly taking anti-U.S. stances, he and Gus Hall, General Secretary of the Communist Party, USA lambasted then current President Gerald Ford and Secretary of State Henry Kissinger that they were "threatening World War in their attempts to salvage the sinking ship of the world and U.S. capitalism."

== Sources ==
- "Ishmael Flory, fighter for equality, 96". (February 19, 2004). People's World Newspaper.
- "Ishmael Flory, noted civil rights/political activist and union organizer, succumbs in Chicago at 96". Encyclopedia.com. 2004-03-01.
- Appelhans, Bill and Black, Carolyn. (August 9, 2002). "Ish Flory, A lifetime champion of equality". People's World Newspaper.
