= Aubrey Grossman =

American civil rights lawyer (1911–1999)

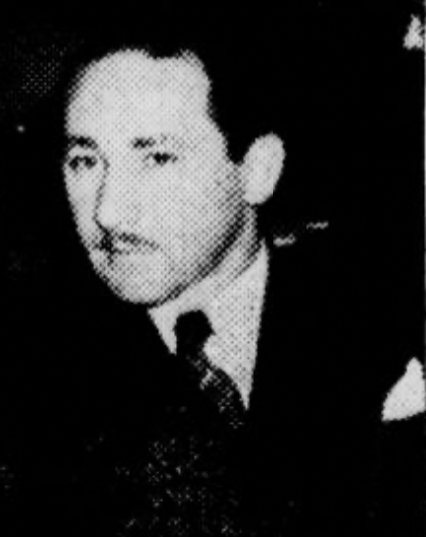
- Grossman in a 1941 publication of the Imperial Valley Press
- Born: 1911; San Bernardino, California, US
- Died: December 8, 1999 (aged 88)
- Education: University of California, Los Angeles; UC Berkeley School of Law
- Occupation: Attorney
- Political party: Communist Party USA

C. Aubrey Grossman (1911 – December 8, 1999) was an American attorney during the Civil rights movement, notably defending Willie McGee.

== Early life and education ==
Born in San Bernardino, California, in 1911, Grossman graduated from the University of California, Los Angeles, where he had played football at, as well as attending the UC Berkeley School of Law. A member of Communist Party USA, he was nearly expelled for protesting, and had to sue in order to receive his law license, due to being deemed radical by the American Legion while reciting the loyalty oath.

== Career ==
Grossman defended Australian-born labor unionist Harry Bridges in his deportation case when the United States Government considered him Communist. He also defended Vietnam War draft evaders and occupiers during the Occupation of Alcatraz. He also defended Willie McGee, but lost the case; he attempted to get a stay of execution and was attacked by a group of people. He worked as a national secretary for the Civil Rights Congress.

Grossman was a signatory of W. E. B. Du Bois' We Charge Genocide petition.

In the early 1970s, he defended the Pit River and Pomo peoples in their case against Pacific Gas and Electric Company to reclaim stolen Native land, using legal deeds to prove it was Native land. He was jailed for five days for calling the judge a liar. For this, the State Bar of California attempted to terminate his lawyer license, a decision that was stopped when former California governor Pat Brown showed support for Grossman. He defended a Chinese acupuncturist charged with operating without a medical license. He was found 'not guilty', and the verdict led to laws to protect acupuncturists.

Grossman married a peace activist named Hazel, having two children together. He died on December 8, 1999, aged 88, of illness.
