= National Federation for Constitutional Liberties =

Civil rights advocacy group (1940–c. 1946)

The National Federation for Constitutional Liberties (NFCL) (1940–c. 1946) was a civil rights advocacy group made up from a broad range of people (including many trade unionists, religious organizations, African-American civil rights advocates and professional organizations).

== History ==
=== Formation ===
The NFCL founded at a national conference on civil liberties held in Washington, D.C. in June 1940.

=== Purpose ===
The purpose of the Federation was co-ordinate the activities of the various groups involved within the organization to gain greater democratic freedoms for all who were involved. As well as civil rights advocacy, the Federation was also against lynching, poll tax, and discrimination, the Jim Crow laws, and ran campaigns against these occurrences.

In a proposed Anti-Fascist Civil Rights Declaration for 1944, the Federation called for a permanent Fair Employment Practice Committee (FEPC), equality within the US armed forces, legislation against antisemitism and all forms of incitement to racial hatred, a ban on discrimination in employment and in housing, the abolition of Jim Crow, and passage of a federal anti-lynching bill.

The Federation publicized its campaigns and other activities through numerous pamphlets and through Action Letters mailed to thousands of local leaders, unions, churches, civic and professional groups. It organized conferences, public meetings and banquets with outstanding speakers and civil liberties advocates. Its Academic Council led the defense of educators like Max Yergan, blacklisted by the United States for their political beliefs.

=== Controversy ===
The Federation was considered "subversive" and "Communist" by Attorney General Tom C. Clark, and the group was considered one of eleven "subversive organizations", drawn up on 3 April 1947 at the request of Clark.

Attorney General Francis Biddle claimed this was as "part of what Lenin called the 'solar system' of organizations, ostensibly having no connection with the Communist Party, by which Communists attempt to create sympathizers and supporters of their program".

For its entire existence, Milton N. Kemnitz was the Executive Secretary; he worked for the NFLC full time except for years when he was on convoy duty in North Atlantic and Mediterranean during World War II. Kemnitz and George Marshall, who served as chairman of the National Federation for Constitutional Liberties and the Civil Rights Congress, worked with Paul Robeson, Dashiell Hammett, and William L. Patterson on litigation protecting the rights of African-Americans, labor union organizers, and American communists. Kemnitz met weekly with Paul Robeson while they were negotiating the merger of the organizations. Kemnitz left the combined organization in October of 1947 to pursue a career as an artist in Ann Arbor, Michigan. He and Marshall were called before the House Committee on Un-American Activities, where Marshall took the lead and was cited for Contempt of Congress for refusing to turn over records from the National Federation. Convicted, he served three months in a federal prison in 1950.

The proceedings of an April 1942 National Action Conference to protest the suspension of civil liberties at the onset of American involvement in World War II has been published by Royal Fireworks Press of Unionville, New York.

== Merger ==
By 1946–1947, the NFCL rolled into the Civil Rights Congress (along with the International Labor Defense (ILD) and the National Negro Congress.

== Publications ==
- Investigating Committees and Civil Rights (1941), 28-page pamphlet written by Abraham J. Isserman

== See also ==
- Communist front
- Civil Rights Congress
- International Labor Defense
- National Negro Congress
