= Alexander Heard =

Alexander Heard may refer to:

- G. Alexander Heard (1917–2009), chancellor of Vanderbilt University, political scientist and presidential adviser
- Alexander S. Heard, editorial director of Outside magazine and author
