= National Negro Congress =

African-American political organization (1936–ca. 1946)

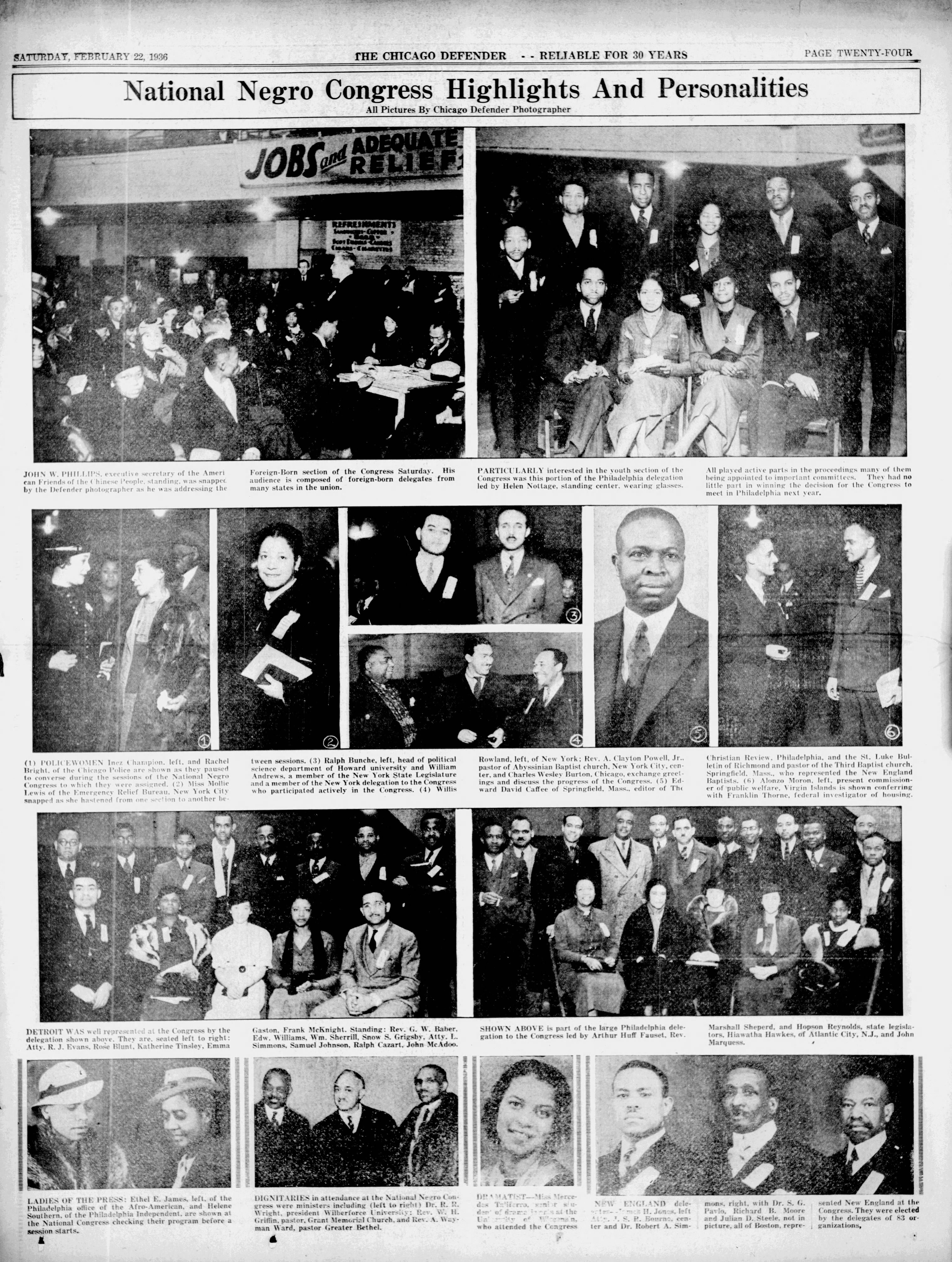
Coverage of the National Negro Congress in The Chicago Defender, February 22, 1936

In African-American history, the National Negro Congress (NNC; 1936–ca. 1946) was an African-American organization formed in 1936 at Howard University as a broadly-based coalition working to advance African American civil and employment rights. It subsumed the League of Struggle for Negro Rights. Although an idea which came out of the American Communist Party, the Congress organization and model stressed broad coalition of different ideologies and groups in "an unprecedented confluence of civic, civil rights, labor, and religious groups from across the nation."

During the Great Depression, the Party turned to popular-front coalition method and worked in the United States to unite black and white workers and intellectuals in the fight for racial justice. This period represented the Party's peak of prestige in African-American communities. NNC was opposed to war, fascism, and discrimination, especially racial discrimination. During the Great Depression era, a majority of Americans faced immense economic problems. Many lost their jobs and as a result, were forced to live at the margins of society. The crisis highlighted inequities for many African Americans, who were unemployed at higher rates than whites.

Historically, many black workers were segregated and more often than not, racially discriminated in the labor force. In order to combat racism within their respective jobs, they had to establish a union. However, many of the unions around the depression era had exclusively white members, excluding African Americans from their protection and benefits. Black workers took initiative to unite against racism and classism. "John P. Davis and Communist Party leader James W. Ford decided to bring together meaningful organizations that would be dedicated in the ongoing fight against racial discrimination." Class does not embody one particular race, but transcends racial borders to integrate many ethnic groups alike to face a similar struggle: a class struggle. When, after the 1939 Pact between the Soviet Union and Nazi Germany, Communist and Fascist, the Party turned again to Communist Internationale work, the NNC's broad coalition disintegrated.

== History ==
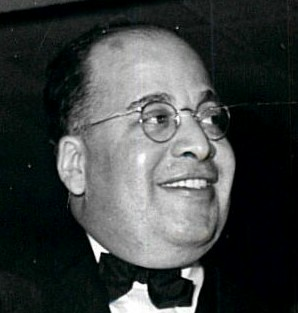
John P. Davis co-founded the NNC

The foundation of the National Negro Congress was a response to the historical oppression African Americans faced in the United States, in particular in the workforce. Black workers were marginalized and exploited from the time when they were enslaved, and the National Negro Congress advocated for black liberation through many sectors of the African-American life. The NNC launched a broad and multifaceted assault on racism and economic exploitation. Forging alliances with organized labor, the Communist Party, and even mainstream civil rights groups, the NNC not only drew on the talents and resources of a cross section of organizations but also established a blueprint for subsequent generation of black activists according to Erik Geolman. Though the NNC coordinated activities with an array of groups, it forged Participants included intellectuals from Howard University, civic and civil rights leaders, labor leaders and religious groups. White participation was not excluded. Black workers affiliated with the National Negro Congress advocated for integration into the larger and better funded unions such as the CIO. Although the CIO supported the foundation of the National Negro Congress to fight for civil rights and against racism, the communist aspect of the Congress deprived both organizations from having strong ties to each other.

There developed a division between those who supported communism, including its fight on behalf of African Americans, and those who only supported civil rights. With the loss of support from the CIO and AFL, African Americans were excluded from major unions. With the emergence of the National Negro Congress, the African-American community found refuge with activists identifying as communist. Even with having a safe space to discuss about class struggle, Black workers did not have any radical union that took a stand against capital within the race framework. In spite of not having the support of the AFL or the CIO, they relied upon the militancy and communist-led organization of the NNC. Aside from challenging the concept of racism, members of the National Negro Congress advocated against the fascism abroad and the new deal in the United States.

The election of Franklin D. Roosevelt resulted in a huge economic, political and social reform over the succeeding years. With the implementation of the New Deal, many African Americans in the North believed they had elected a new leader whose ideas seemed radical. However most of these programs did not have any say or input of the African-American community. Therefore, most of the struggles that were faced for being black in the United States were neglected:

On a whim, Davis attended President Franklin Delano Roosevelt's first National Recovery Administration hearing and noticed, in disbelief, that no one represented the interests of African-Americans. He contacted his friend Robert C. Weaver, another Harvard University graduate, and formed the two-man Joint Committee on National Recovery in 1933, challenging Roosevelt's New Deal programs. The two were determined to become the first full-time lobbyists for civil-rights in American history. They traveled the back roads of the deep and dangerous - for a black man - South investigating lynchings, voting rights violations of black Americans, and the squalid working conditions of black agricultural, textile and factory workers"

Because of extensive disenfranchisement of African Americans in the South, the powerful Southern Block in Congress represented only their white constituents. The black community from different sectors of the community began to form their own institution to address issues that pertain within the black experience. The National Negro Congress consisted mainly of Blacks, but not exclusively.

== Race integration and communism ==
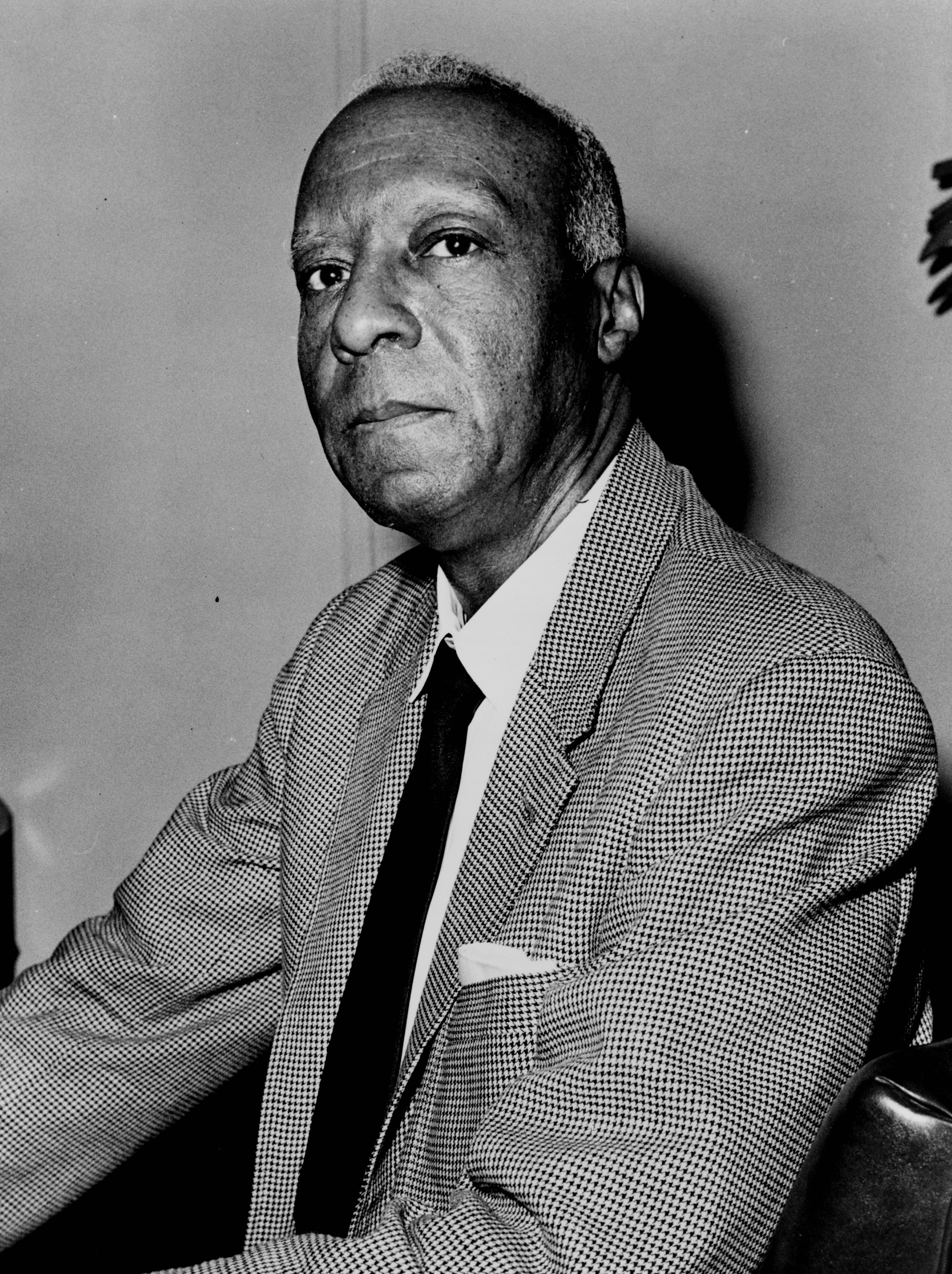
A. Philip Randolph (here, 1963) was major union leader and NNC member

The foundation of the National Negro Congress is therefore a result and a product of resistance used by the oppressed to confront the national government. Self-determination was a concept that was used as agency for protection against racism as explained in the purpose during the first National Negro Congress in February 1936: "The magnitude, complexity, and danger of the Negro's present condition demands the mobilization of overwhelming mass pressure and force, which can only be achieve through the agency of a National Negro Congress ." Analyzing the current conditions of their experience in the United States allowed African Americans to realize the failings of government institutions. The main leader, A. Philip Randolph, was instrumental in gathering not only socialists and communists but was able to organize massive popular participation by African Americans. By struggling against not only racism but capitalism, the leadership under Randolph was able to forge relationships with white workers and intellectuals. Bridging race gaps among black and white workers, the notion of segregation was often challenged. Issues such as class was a way for ethnic groups to bridge some differences; what was at stake was the root of the economic and political turmoil they were placed in: capital and capitalism.

But in order to cultivate change within the workforce, A. Philip Randolph had to cultivate change through the regulations of the National Negro Congress: "As part of its attempt to bring blacks into the labor movement, the Congress became a leading force for ending the racial restrictions on membership in many unions. In 1934, A. Philip Randolph had urged delegates at the American Federation of Labor convention to order 'the elimination of the color clause and pledge from the constitution and rituals of all trade and industrial unions' and the expulsion of all unions which maintained 'said color bar.'"

=== Race relations among workers ===
The communists believed that working cooperatively could help black and white workers ease racial tensions, rather than competing against each other, and if unification were to ever happen, it would be accomplished through the struggle of black and white workers. In addition to the racial division that existed among larger, powerful union was the wage black workers were earning in contrast to the white workers. For example, in the book the National Negro Congress: A Reassessment by Lawrence S. Wittner, the author explains the miserable conditions suffered by African-Americans workers and their generally low wages.

Blacks had a crucial position in the emerging struggle, as well as a vital stake in it. In 1936, there were perhaps as many as 85,000 Negro steelworkers- 20 per cent of the laborers and 6 per cents of the operators in the industry. Restricted to the worst jobs, with intense heat and noxious gases, they also encountered a wide network of racially discriminatory differential – averaged $3.60 per day.

Through the commodification of black workers, industry and unions treated them as bodies that produce profit. The exclusion of black workers from white-dominated unions was used to dehumanize black workers. The National Negro Congress validated the struggle and existence of Black Americans in the United States. Noticing that the National Negro Congress was drifting into left-wing sectionalism, Randolph reinforced the tradition of prioritizing the black community first above organizations and ideologies: "sensing the drift of the Congress toward left-wing sectarianism, A. Philip Randolph fought back in behalf of its traditional aims of racial integrity and black unity ... He rejected Congress affiliation with both major parties, the Communist Party, the Socialist Party and with the Soviet Union: none, he noted, placed the interests of Negroes first".

The interests of numerous radical parties were not founded in the principles of race. As a matter of fact, they only saw class struggle as a problem for Americans. The negligence of race further deprived many African-Americans from amplifying their voice about their experience in the labor-work force. It was something that can be seen as divisive because generally black workers who belonged, if not lower than a poor working-class man, to the working class that is considered diversified among its members. Moreover, Randolph believed that if the National Negro Congress were to ever be in the dependency of radical and revolutionary party, it should never be subjugated or controlled by the party for their own advantage: "Appealing to the Congress, he asked for a leadership that would be 'free from intimidation, manipulation or subordination ... a leadership which is uncontrolled and responsible to no one but the Negro people." With no tying to any political affiliation, Randolph wanted the National Negro Congress to be free from any biased decision regarding the African-American struggle. By being independent from any political party, he is creating space of grassroots organizing. The interest of the people should come from the people themselves and that is what is Randolph is imploring. The very act of defiance is resisting. Although he advocated for the integration of black workers to the AFL-CIO, Randolph wanted the National Negro Congress to be a separate entity; a space where black workers from the AFL-CIO can use for their affirmation of their struggle as a black working class.

=== Support for African-Americans ===
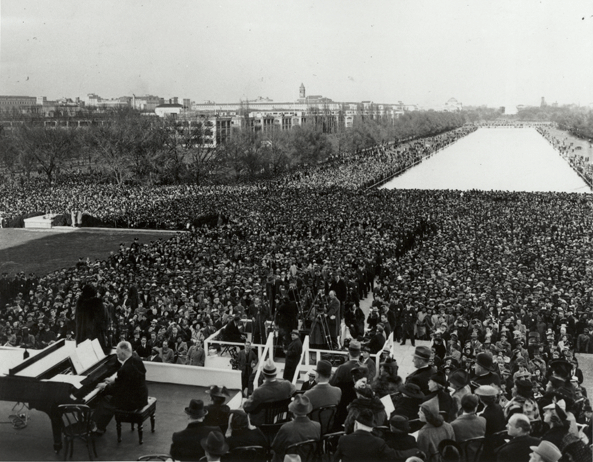
Marian Anderson in her 1939 concert at the Lincoln Memorial

In 1939, the Daughters of the American Revolution (DAR) refused permission for Marian Anderson to sing to an integrated audience in their Constitution Hall. At the time, Washington, D.C., was a segregated city and black patrons were upset that they had to sit at the back of Constitution Hall. Constitution Hall also did not have the segregated public bathrooms required by DC law at the time for such events. The District of Columbia Board of Education also declined a request to use the auditorium of a white public high school.

In 1940, Paul Robeson learned the patriotic song "Chee Lai!" ("Arise!" also known as the March of the Volunteers) from the Chinese progressive activist, Liu Liangmo. Robeson premiered the song at a large concert in New York City's Lewisohn Stadium and recorded it in both English and Chinese for Keynote Records in early 1941. Its 3-disc album included a booklet whose preface was written by Soong Ching-ling, widow of Sun Yat-sen, Robeson gave further performances at benefits for the China Aid Council and United China Relief at their sold-out concert at Washington's Uline Arena on April 24, 1941. The Washington Committee for Aid to China had booked Constitution Hall but had been blocked by the Daughters of the American Revolution owing to Robeson's race. The indignation was great enough that President Roosevelt's wife Eleanor and Hu Shih, the Chinese ambassador, joined as sponsors. However, when the organizers offered tickets on generous terms to the National Negro Congress to help fill the larger venue, these sponsors withdrew, in objection to the NNC's Communist ties. Details of the withdrawal of support may be found in the testimony of a House Un-American Activities Committee informant.

In 1942, Doris Miller received recognition as one of the "first US heroes of World War II," commended by a letter signed by US Secretary of the Navy Frank Knox on April 1, and the next day, CBS Radio broadcast an episode of the series They Live Forever, which dramatized Miller's actions. The All-Southern Negro Youth Conference launched a signature campaign on April 17–19. On May 10, the National Negro Congress denounced Knox's recommendation against awarding Miller the Medal of Honor. (On May 11, President Roosevelt approved the Navy Cross for Miller.)

In 1944, Aubrey Pankey performed a concert at Carnegie Hall in New York City produced by the National Negro Congress in 1944. His encores that evening included a march popular with Soviet troops and Die Moorsoldaten, a song of the victims of the Nazi concentration camps.

In 1946, the National Negro Congress set up picket lines in theaters in the big cities where the film played, with its protesters holding signs that read "Song of the South is an insult to the Negro people" and, lampooning "Jingle Bells", chanted: "Disney tells, Disney tells/lies about the South." On April 2, 1947, a group of protesters marched around Paramount Theatre (Oakland, California) with picket signs reading, "We want films on Democracy not Slavery" and "Don't prejudice children's minds with films like this". Jewish newspaper B'nai B'rith Messenger of Los Angeles considered the film to be "tall[ying] with the reputation that Disney is making for himself as an arch-reactionary".

== Members ==
Members of the NNC included:

- John P. Davis, co-founder
- James W. Ford, co-founder
- Paul Robeson, chairman (1944)
- Max Yergan, second president
- Ferdinand Smith, member (or supporter)
- Thelma Dale Perkins, national secretary
- Revels Cayton, executive secretary
- A. Philip Randolph, member
- Harry Haywood, member
- Arthur Fauset, Philadelphia chapter president
- Ishmael Flory, Chicago chapter president
- M. Moran Weston, field secretary
- Richard Wright (author), member
- Charles White (artist), house artist for NNC Chicago
- Walter Benjamin Garland, member
- Abram Flaxer, member
- Leon Josephson, ILD head when NNC merged with the NFCL to form the CRC
- Frederick Vanderbilt Field, ILD member when NNC merged with the NFCL to form the CRC
- Manning Johnson, delegate

== Merger ==
Around 1946, the NNC merged with the International Labor Defense (ILD) and National Federation for Constitutional Liberties (NFCL) to form the Civil Rights Congress (CRC) (1946–1956).

== See also ==
- League of Struggle for Negro Rights
- International Labor Defense
- National Federation for Constitutional Liberties
- Scottsboro Boys
- A. Philip Randolph
- Civil Rights Congress
- Colored Conventions Movement

== External sources ==
- Fleming, Thomas C. (September 22, 1999). "The National Negro Congress of 1936". Columbus Free Press.
- http://eblackstudies.org/intro/chapter16.htm
- http://www.encyclopedia.chicagohistory.org/pages/3214.html
- http://www.blackpast.org/?q=aah/national-negro-congress
- http://www.collection.johnpdaviscollection.org/
- http://www.negroparty.com
- http://www.blackradicalcongress.org/black-congresses.html
