= Alexander S. Heard =

American editor and writer

Alexander S. Heard is editorial director of Outside magazine and the author of Apocalypse Pretty Soon, a book about millennial subcultures in the United States. His book, The Eyes of Willie McGee: A Tragedy of Race, Sex, and Secrets in the Jim Crow South, about the 1951 execution of Willie McGee, was published in 2010.

Prior to his work with Outside, he was the executive editor for Wired magazine. He has also edited and written for The New York Times Magazine, The New Republic, The Washington Post and Slate.

Heard is a graduate of Vanderbilt University.
