= International Labor Defense =

US legal advocacy organization

International Labor Defense (ILD)
- Predecessor: Comintern's International Red Aid
- Merged into: with National Federation for Constitutional Liberties and National Negro Congress
- Successor: Civil Rights Congress
- Formation: June 28, 1925
- Founder: James P. Cannon, William D. Haywood
- Merger of: April 28, 1947
- Purpose: Promote world peace
- Location: New York City
- Services: defend rights of political prisoners
- Members: ~ 300,000 (circa 1939)
- Official language: English
- Affiliations: American League for Peace and Democracy, American Committee for the Protection of Foreign Born
- Website: marxists.org/history/usa/eam/other/ild/ild.html

The International Labor Defense (ILD) (1925–1947) was a legal advocacy organization established in 1925 in the United States as the American section of the Comintern's International Red Aid network. The ILD defended Sacco and Vanzetti, was active in the anti-lynching, movements for civil rights, and prominently participated in the defense and legal appeals in the cause célèbre of the Scottsboro Boys in the early 1930s. Its work contributed to the appeal of the Communist Party among African Americans in the South. In addition to fundraising for defense and assisting in defense strategies, from January 1926 it published Labor Defender, a monthly illustrated magazine that achieved wide circulation. In 1946 the ILD was merged with the National Federation for Constitutional Liberties to form the Civil Rights Congress, which served as the new legal defense organization of the Communist Party USA. It intended to expand its appeal, especially to African Americans in the South. In several prominent cases in which blacks had been sentenced to death in the South, the CRC campaigned on behalf of black defendants. It had some conflict with former allies, such as the NAACP, and became increasingly isolated. Because of federal government pressure against organizations it considered subversive, such as the CRC, it became less useful in representing defendants in criminal justice cases. The CRC was dissolved in 1956. At the same time, in this period, black leaders were expanding the activities and reach of the Civil Rights Movement. In 1954, in a case managed by the NAACP, the US Supreme Court ruled in Brown v. Board of Education that segregation of public schools was unconstitutional.

== History ==
=== Pre-Communist forerunners ===
Ever since the birth of the organized labor movement, economic disputes have been contested in the legal system. In some cases, an employer or government has gone to court to achieve termination of strike actions, or to seek prosecution for alleged malefactors for physical violence or property damage resulting from such turmoil. The use of the injunction by employers to prohibit specific actions and its enforcement by the courts occasionally resulted in groups of defendants being embroiled in the costly legal system for union activities. The Pullman Strike of 1894, which brought about the trial and imprisonment of the officers of the American Railway Union, is but one example.

The syndicalist Industrial Workers of the World was subject to particularly intense legal pressure, framed at times as "free speech" actions, and in other situations less ambiguously as legal actions against union organizers and activists for their economic activities. To defend its core activists and their activities from what was systematic legal attack, the IWW established a legal advocacy organization called the General Defense Committee (GDC). It raised funds and coordinated the union's legal defense efforts.

Government efforts to silence and jail conscientious objectors and anti-militarist political opponents of World War I in 1917 and 1918 resulted in more than 2,000 prosecutions. These cases led to the formation of a legal defense organization for these defendants called the Civil Liberties Bureau, continued today as the American Civil Liberties Union (ACLU).

=== Communist forerunners ===
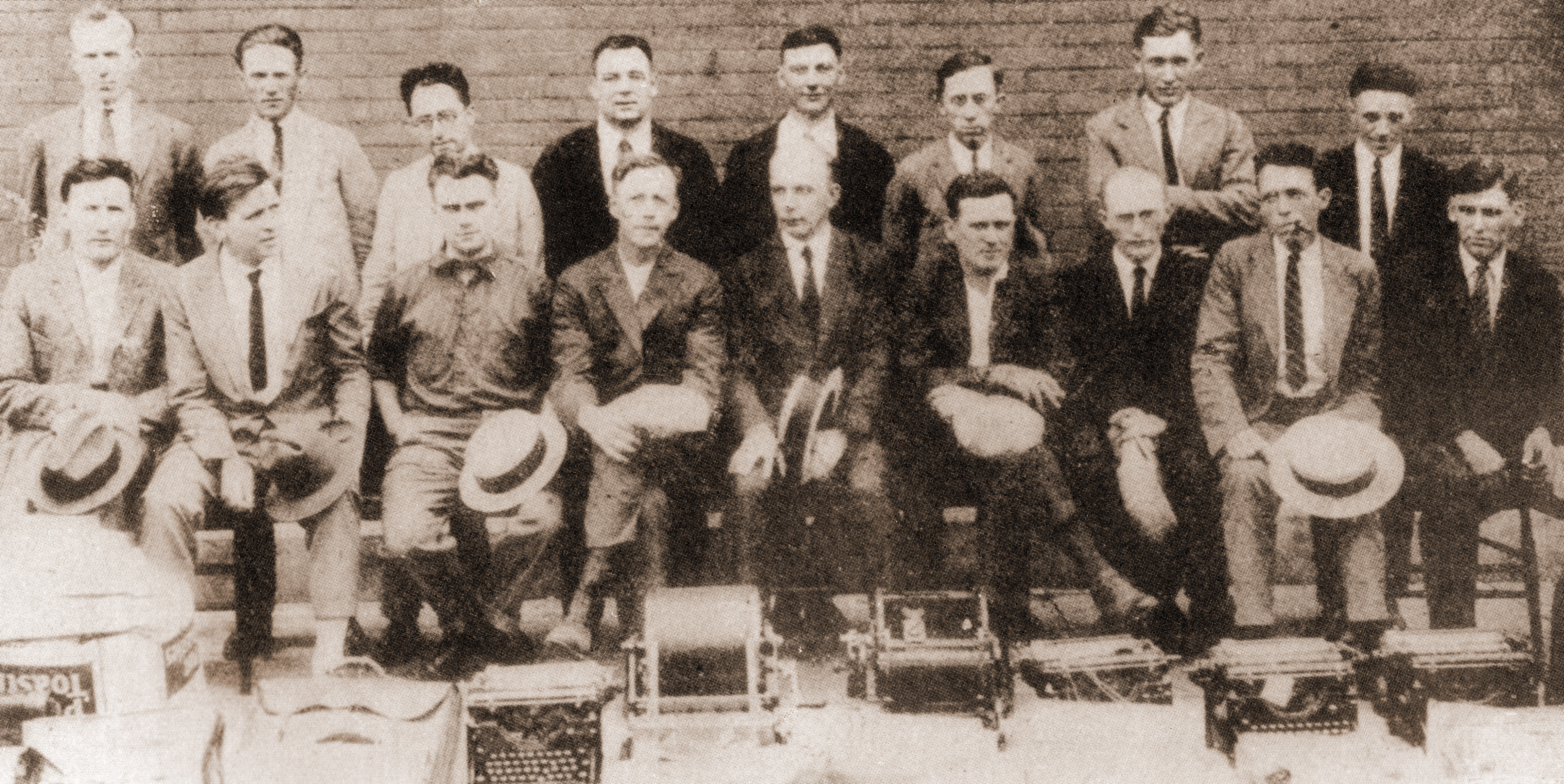
Party leaders jailed in connection with the August 1922 raid on the CPA's Bridgman Convention. Executive Secretary C.E. Ruthenberg is seated in the front row in the middle. The Labor Defense Council was established to defend the individuals arrested in this raid.

The fledgling American Communist movement which emerged in the summer of 1919 quickly was subject to systemic legal attack as part of the First Red Scare. On November 7 and 8, 1919, New York state authorities, at the behest of the Lusk Committee of the New York state legislature, conducted coordinated raids upon headquarters and about 70 meeting places of the Communist Party of America (CPA).

This effort was expanded and intensified on the night of January 2/3, 1920 in a mass dragnet by the Bureau of Investigation of the Justice Department, coordinated by the newly appointed J. Edgar Hoover, 24-year-old assistant to the Attorney General of the United States, and remembered in history as the Palmer Raids. This followed a series of strikes and bombings in 1919, including one against US Attorney General Palmer. An estimated 10,000 arrests and detentions resulted from the latter operation, with hundreds held for possible deportation from the United States for alleged violation of immigration laws caused by their purported "anarchist" political activity.

==== National Defense Committee (1920) ====
There was a massive need for legal defense on the part of those arrested in connection with these official operations against the communist political movement. In 1920 the Communist Party established its first legal defense organization, the National Defense Committee (NDC), to raise funds and provide legal services for its adherents in legal trouble with criminal or immigration authorities. A number of leading communist activists, including political leaders Max Bedacht and L.E. Katterfeld of the Communist Labor Party (CLP) and C.E. Ruthenberg of the CPA, as well as attorney I.E. Ferguson, served on the governing Executive Committee of the NDC. CLP member Edgar Owens acted as Secretary-Treasurer. A number of prominent liberal and radical attorneys were employed by the group, including Swinburne Hale, Walter Nelles, Charles Recht, and Joseph R. Brodsky.

The NDC maintained headquarters in Chicago and coordinated its work with another radical legal defense organization based in the East called the Workers Defense Committee (WDC). The efforts of these groups to defend those arrested in the Palmer Raids was largely successful, with the result that ultimately fewer than 10% of those arrested in Hoover's January 1920 raids suffered deportation.

Rare pinback button issued by the Labor Defense Council in conjunction with the 1923 trials of chief Bridgman defendants William Z. Foster and C.E. Ruthenberg

In August 1922 another legal crisis arose for the American Communist movement when its 1922 National Convention at Bridgman, Michigan, was raided by state and federal authorities, resulting in the arrest of dozens of leading party activists, headed by top trade union official William Z. Foster and CPA Executive Secretary C.E. Ruthenberg. The latter had only recently been released from Sing Sing prison after a conviction for criminal anarchy under New York state law. A new legal defense organization called the Labor Defense Council (LDC) was established to raise funds and coordinate defense efforts for this new group of defendants.

Costs associated with the Bridgman case were high, with prominent labor lawyer Frank P. Walsh demanding a fee of $50,000 in the case. Another $90,000 was tied up in bail from supporters. The LDC contributed mightily to this effort, raising more than $100,000 from party supporters and concerned trade unionists in the interest of the case.

Although established by the Communist Party, the LDC included a number of prominent non-Communists among its formal Executive Committee, including Eugene V. Debs, recently freed Socialist Party orator and writer, and Max S. Hayes, a Cleveland, Ohio trade unionist and journalist. This broad base of support strengthened fundraising activities of the organization among those who would be less inclined to support a purely Communist organization. Control of the organization and its funds remained firmly in Communist Party hands.

The Bridgman case ended in a protracted stalemate. The initial test case against William Z. Foster resulted in a hung jury. A second case against C.E. Ruthenberg resulted in a conviction, but a series of appeals that reached the United States Supreme Court extended the process for years. Ruthenberg died of acute appendicitis shortly after his appeals were exhausted but before he could be shepherded to prison. Tens of thousands of dollars remained tied up on bail well into the 1930s, but no further cases were tried against those indicted in association with the 1922 Bridgman conclave.

==== International Red Aid (MOPR) (1922–1943) ====
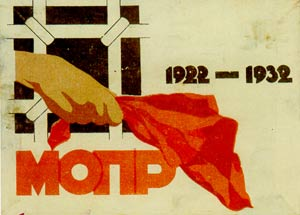
Symbol of International Red Aid used at the time of its 10th Anniversary in 1932

In the spring of 1922 "Big Bill" Haywood, former Wobbly leader turned bail-jumper and defector to Soviet Russia, made a proposal in Moscow to establish a new entity dedicated to the legal defense of political prisoners in the United States, given its level of activity. Representatives of the Communist Party of Poland in Soviet Russia had a similar need, and sought organized support for their jailed comrades in Poland. The Russian Society of Old Bolsheviks and Former Political Exiles and Prisoners, a group whose members had previously raised funds for the support of political prisoners in Tsarist times, acted upon these suggestions late in the summer of 1922. They passed a resolution calling for the establishment of a new international organization for the legal and economic support of left-wing political prisoners.

This organization was established first in Soviet Russia as the International Society for the Aid of Revolutionary Fighters (MOPR). Outside Soviet Russia the organization was known as International Red Aid (IRA), although the MOPR acronym was also used as an abbreviation for the international organization.

IRA was formally launched on an international basis in conjunction with the 4th World Congress of the Comintern, held in Moscow from November 5 to December 5, 1922. Although professing to be a "non-party, mass organization of the working class", the IRA emphasized its organic connection to the Comintern during its first five years.

In its initial phase, IRA conducted activities on behalf of jailed Communists only, rather than non-party labor activists and members of other political organizations. The Russian national section, MOPR, was responsible for providing some 98% of the funds gathered in 1923, of which more than 70% were spent on the defense and support of jailed revolutionaries in Germany and Bulgaria alone—two countries in which there were failed Communist uprisings in that year. While other funds were no doubt collected outside Soviet Russia by national affiliates of IRA and spent locally, in its initial phase, the organization was essentially a means to provide Soviet support for the defense of imprisoned revolutionaries.

Over the next several years, debate occurred within the Comintern and the IRA apparatus as to whether the organization should continue as an openly Communist organization giving aid only to jailed Communists or whether it should try to win broad influence by extending its activities to individuals professing allegiance to other organizations or to no organization at all. During the First International Conference of IRA, held in Moscow on July 14–16, 1924, Israel Amter (1881–1954, co-founder of the CPUSA) "stated unequivocally" that the IRA was not Communist, while stressing the IRA, a "United Front" organization, should support the Communist Party "from below". (Amter was not a member of the IRA when he spoke but became an executive committee member shortly thereafter.) In March 1925, Grigory Zinoviev argued "the IRA is a Communist organization", but the Fifth Plenum of the Executive Committee of the Communist International decided that the IRA "was no longer to be considered a Communist organization, but rather an independent class organization only incidentally supported by Communists." Between 1923 and 1925, IRA spent more than $2 million—half on political prisoners and their families, plus political immigrants to the USSR, and last on legal defense ("conducted exclusively by sections other than MOPR").

In sum:

The Comintern apparatus by 1926 had determined that agitation and propaganda, the means by which IRA made contact with and attempted to gain influence over the masses, would become the central work of the organization... The year 1926 marked the emergence of International Red Aid as a recognized component of the total revolutionary strategy of the Comintern. Having already set up a sound organizational structure, IRA now began to refine its methods of reaching the non-Communist masses, i.e., its weapons of agitation and propaganda. The precise relationship between the Comintern and its auxiliary was also stated, a relationship in which IRA acted strictly according to the dictates of the Comintern, while carefully maintaining the fiction of independence. The years before 1926 had molded International Red Aid to the needs of the Comintern; and after 1926 until its dissolution in 1943 IRA served its parent, faithfully executing every demand of Comintern policy.

=== ILD's establishment (1925) ===
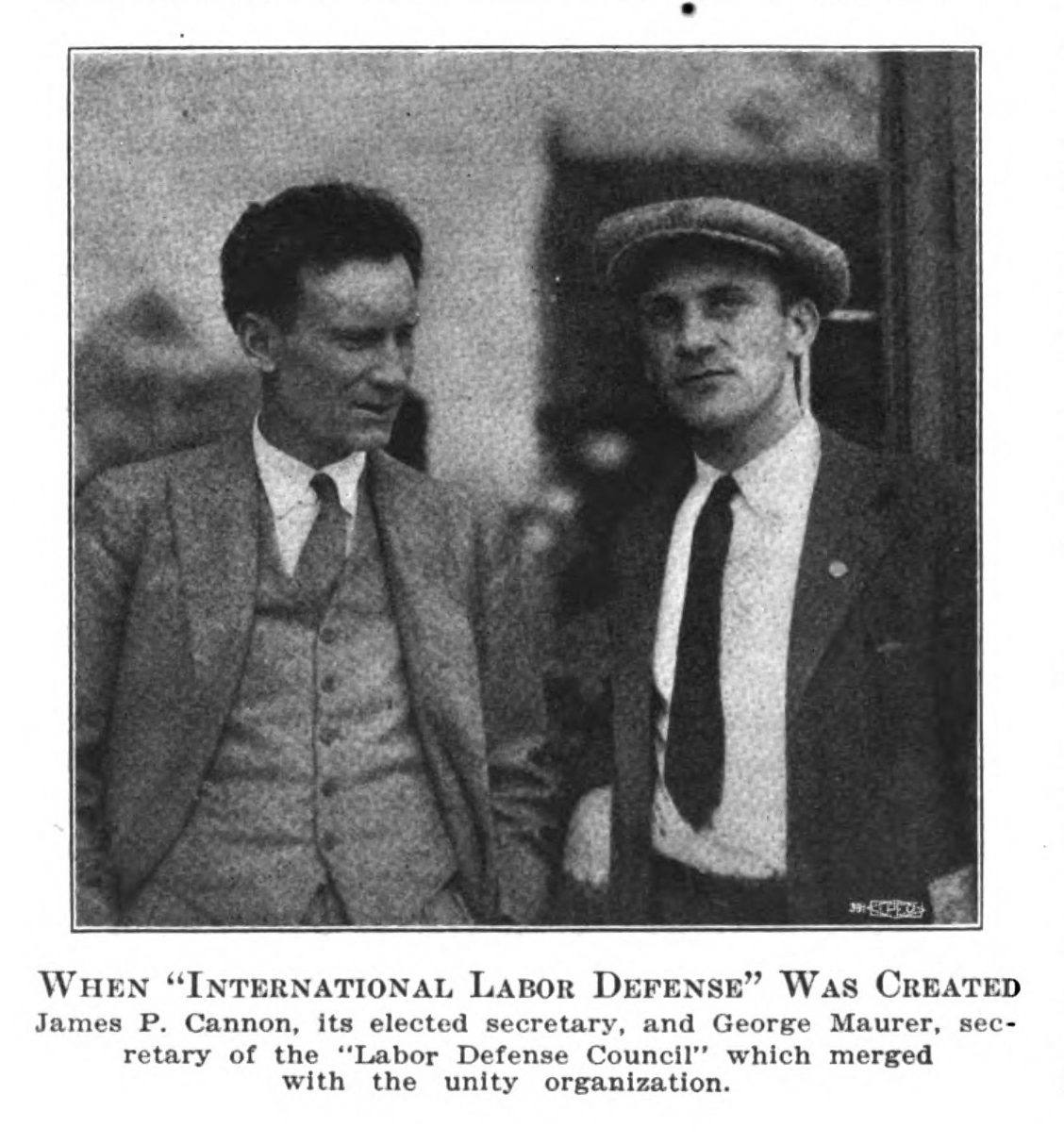
James P. Cannon (left) and George Maurer of the Labor Defense Council, 1925

The legal communist party in the United States, the Workers Party of America, long sought to coordinate and regularize its legal defense activities. James P. Cannon, a former Industrial Workers of the World activist who had become a Communist party leader, was particularly interested in such a new legal defense structure. As early as April 1924, he suggested such a new group, to be known as the "International Workers Defense Committee". This idea of a broad party-sponsored organization for the defense of so-called "class war prisoners" was further developed in Moscow in March 1925 during conversations between Cannon and William D. Haywood, an American IWW leader who had defected to Soviet Russia.

During its early years, the ILD tried to portray itself as a multi-tendency organization largely independent of the Communist Party, as exemplified by this ILD magazine featuring Eugene V. Debs of the rival Socialist Party of America.

After returning to the US in April 1925, Cannon took up the question of a new legal defense organization with the governing Political Committee of the Workers Party. It also received a push from the Comintern to establish an American affiliate of International Red Aid. Cannon's desire for "Americanization" of the name of the new group, thereby "giving it a title which would not push away non-Communist elements," was accepted. The new organization was to be known as International Labor Defense (ILD) and Cannon was appointed as its chief organizer.

Cannon was sent on the road to build support for the fledgling ILD, making use of his extensive network of personal contacts with present and former members of the IWW (so-called "Wobblies"). Cannon and Haywood in Moscow had drawn up an initial list of 106 "class war prisoners" needing legal and financial support, mostly convicted Wobblies jailed under various state criminal syndicalism charges. the next month, the list had 128 names, including such high-profile cases as those of anarchists Nicola Sacco and Bartolomeo Vanzetti, purported Preparedness Day bombers Tom Mooney and Warren Billings, and John B. McNamara, who had confessed to the Los Angeles Times Bombing.

The Communist Party selected the top leadership of ILD; designated National Secretary Jim Cannon submitted a slate of 29 nominees for the group's nominal leadership body, the National Committee—a majority of whom were Workers Party members. The operational governing body of the organization was to be an Executive Committee of nine, of whom six were to be party members and three non-party. With this governing structure decided on June 27, 1925, a founding convention of the ILD was called to order in Chicago on the following day. Subsequent changes to the structure of the organization resulting from this gathering were minor.

=== Operations ===
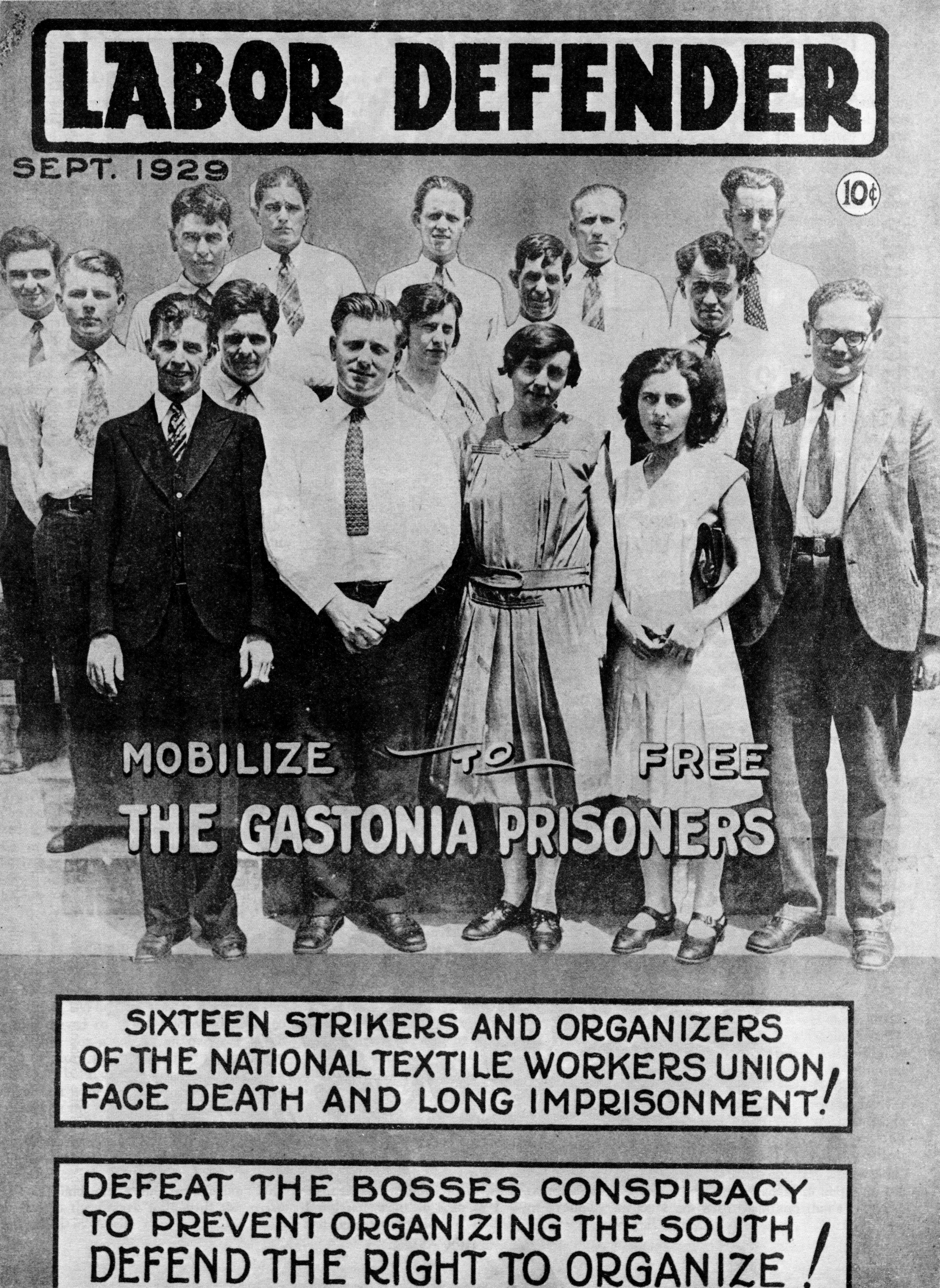
The September 1929 issue of Labor Defender, featuring workers imprisoned for the Loray Mill strike

Within the faction-filled world of the 1920s American Communism, the ILD became a bastion for adherents of the Chicago-based faction of William Z. Foster and James P. Cannon. The organization's paid staff was stuffed with factional loyalists. By 1928 the opposing factional group headed by Jay Lovestone had gained a position of dominance over the party, and they gave increased scrutiny and criticism to ILD activities.

In addition to participating in defense in sensational cases such as those of Sacco and Vanzetti and Tom Mooney, the ILD engaged attorneys in support of jailed strikers in various labor actions. In the late 1920s, it initiated actions on behalf of striking anthracite coal miners in Ohio, Pennsylvania, West Virginia, and Illinois, as well as coordinating legal defense and relief for jailed textile workers in New Bedford, Massachusetts. The group also worked for the release of imprisoned IWW members convicted for their part in the so-called Centralia Massacre of 1919 in Washington state.

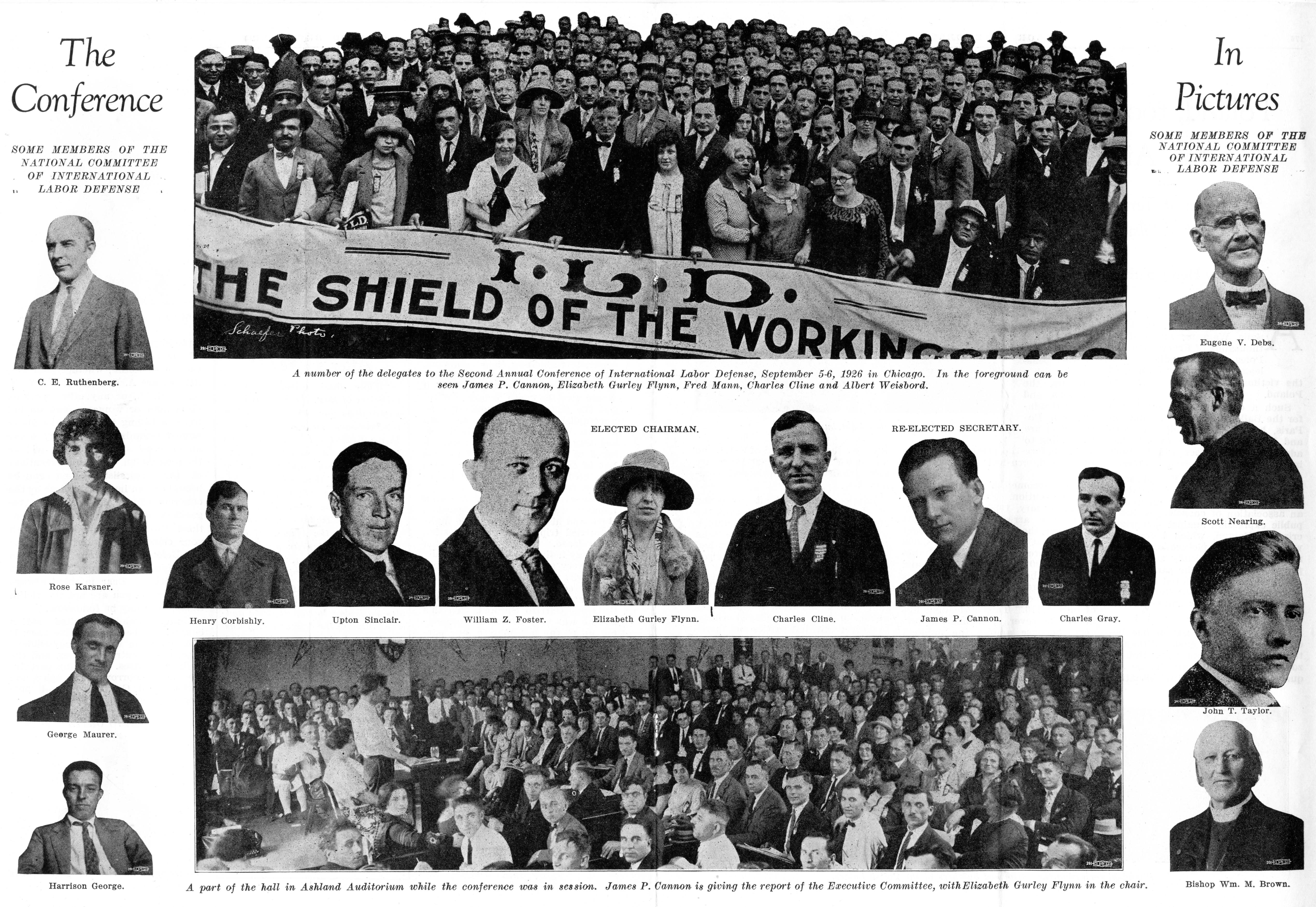
Delegates to the ILD's second annual conference, September 5–6, 1926

In 1928, ILD represented party members Fred Beal, Clarence Miller and five other defendants charged, and ultimately convicted, of conspiracy in the strike-related killing of a police chief in Gastonia, North Carolina. Beal was later to charge that in its instructions to witnesses the party deliberately torpedoed the defense strategy of the ILD's Leon Josephson of sticking to the facts (which included the deaths of several strikers) and of not playing into the prosecution's attempt to place the defendants' revolutionary beliefs on trial.

As the 1930s began, the ILD claimed to be "defending nearly 1,100 workers against capitalist justice." Local branches conducted an endless series of mass meetings and fundraising events. New issues came to the fore, such as the abuse of African Americans used as veritable slave labor in the chain gangs of the Southern prison system. Given the official Communist Party emphasis on the black liberation movement, the ILD and its magazine highlighted the systemic abuse of the African-American population, including chronic inequities of the justice and political system, which in the South had disenfranchised most blacks since the turn of the 20th century. ILD also publicized opposition to lynchings—extrajudicial violence that featured the torture and murder of criminal, mostly black suspects.

The ILD also worked to defend against various government attempts to pass criminal syndicalism legislation in the 1930s, which suppressed workers' right to organize and to strike. The economic crisis of the Great Depression and high unemployment increased pressure on workers to accept whatever management would give.

=== Merger ===
Following World War II, years in which the federal government had intervened in some labor actions in order to protect war production, the Communist Party changed its approach. In 1946 the ILD was merged with the National Federation for Constitutional Liberties (NFCL) and National Negro Congress (NNC) to form the Civil Rights Congress (CRC). The CRC served as the new legal defense organization of the Communist Party USA. The ILD/CRC became more isolated from former allies, in part because of government pressure against communist-affiliated groups. The Party found that its peak of influence had passed after the 1940s, e.g., in 1954, in a case managed by the NAACP, the US Supreme Court ruled in Brown v. Board of Education that segregation of public schools was unconstitutional. The CRC dissolved in 1956, at a time when the Civil Rights Movement was expanding its activities.

== Organization ==
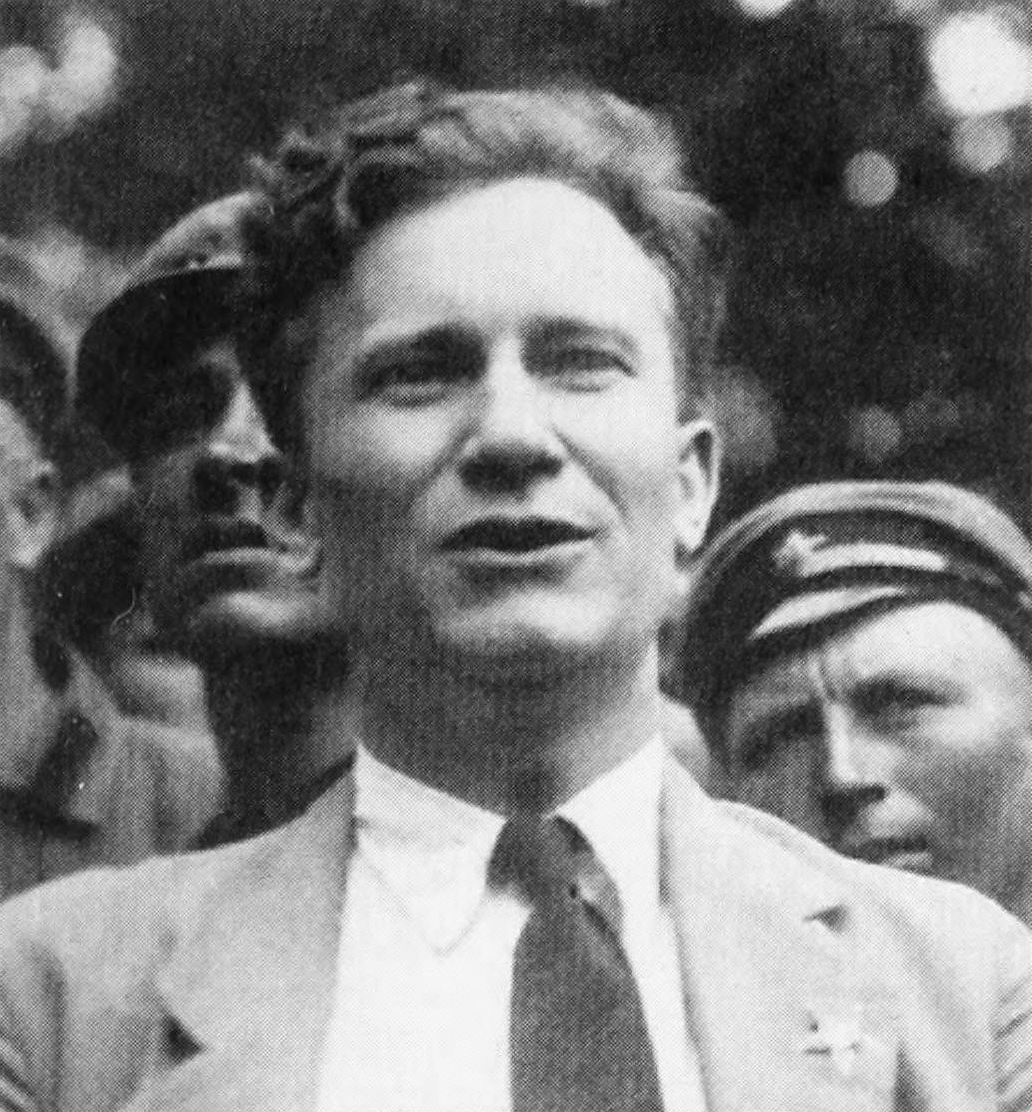
James P. Cannon was instrumental in forming the ILD (no date).

James P. Cannon was formally named as National Secretary of the ILD at its founding convention, with his factional associates Martin Abern tapped as Assistant National Secretary and Max Shachtman named as editor of the new group's official magazine, Labor Defender. Dues were payable either on an individual basis or through the collective affiliation of entire sympathetic organizations. A goal of 200,000 dues-paying members was declared. While falling short of this number, the ILD by 1926 claimed 20,000 individual members in 156 branches, with additional 75,000 collective memberships.

=== Organization in 1925 ===
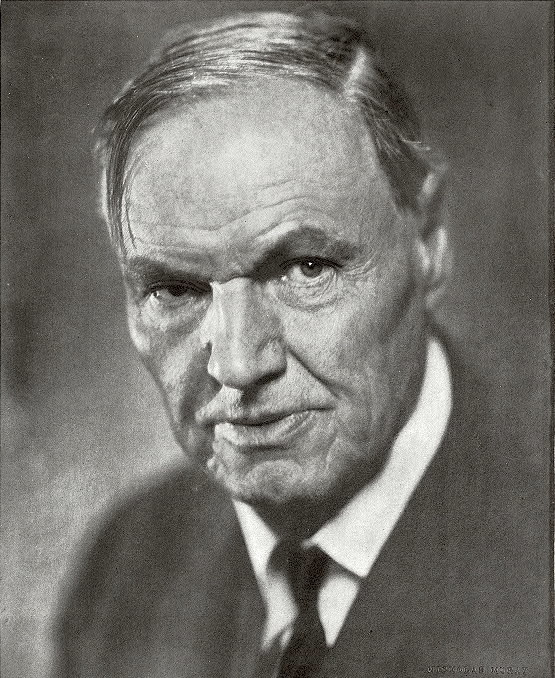
Clarence Darrow, attorney in the Scopes Monkey Trial, was among the co-founders of the ILD.

Founding members of the ILD (of whom many were also associated with the ACLU) included:

- Executives:
  - Andrew T. McNamara, chairman
  - Edward C. Wentworth, vice chairman
  - James P. Cannon, executive secretary

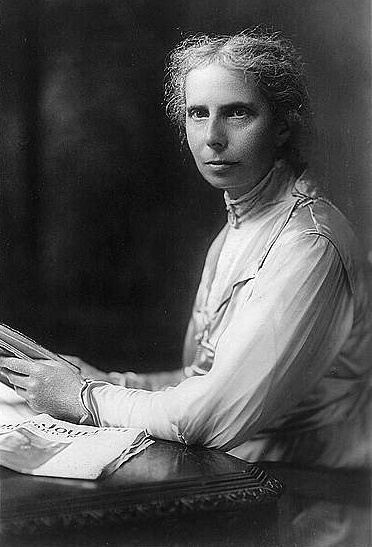
Alice Stone Blackwell (some time between 1880 and 1900) was among the co-founders of the ILD.

- National Committee:
  - Upton Sinclair
  - Eugene V. Debs
  - Clarence Darrow
  - William Z. Foster
  - Robert W. Dunn
  - Andrew T. McNamara
  - Fred Merrick
  - Edward C. Wentworth
  - Bishop William M. Brown
  - Rose Karsner
  - Harrison George
  - William F. Dunne
  - George Maurer
  - Alice Stone Blackwell
  - Helen Hayes
  - Charles E. Ruthenberg
  - Robert Minor
  - Rose Barron
  - William Mollenhauer
  - Henry Corbishley
  - Mandell Schuchter
  - Dan Stevens
  - Benjamin Gitlow
  - Robert Whitaker
  - Cora Meyers
  - David Rhys Williams
  - Fred Mann
  - John Edenstrom
  - Lovett Fort Whitman
  - Jacob Dolla
  - James P. Cannon
  - E. R. Meitzen
  - J. O. Bentall
  - Ralph Chaplin
  - Max Bedacht

=== Organization in 1939 ===
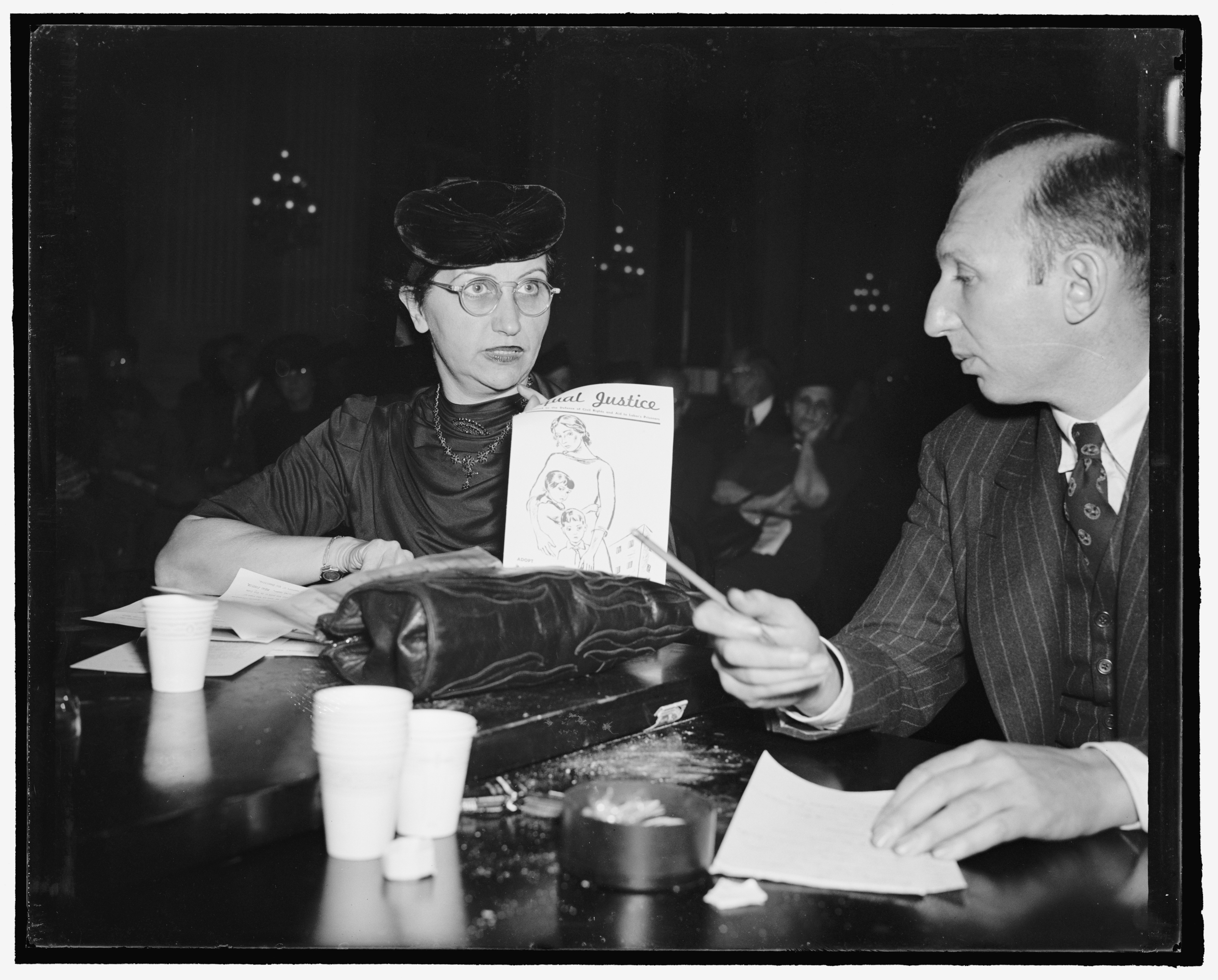
Anna Damon testifies before the Dies Committee, October 16, 1939.

On October 16, 1939, Anna Damon (born Anna Cohen, married as Anna E. David) appeared before the Dies Committee of the U.S. House of Representatives with counsel Abraham J. Isserman and called herself ILD organizational secretary (1934–1937), national secretary (1937–1939), and a "charter member" of the CPUSA who had worked for the Party through the 1920s up to 1933.

Damon also stated that William L. Patterson and J. Louis Engdahl had served as national secretary between her and Cannon. She was unsure whether Juliet Stuart Poyntz had ever served as executive secretary but stated "she was an official".

- National Executive:
  - U.S. Representative Vito Marcantonio, chairman
  - William J. Patterson, vice chairman
  - Robert W. Dunn, treasurer
  - Anna Damon, secretary

During her testimony, Damon stated that membership in the ILD was roughly 300,000 due to "affiliations":

Mr. Whitley: Miss Damon, what is the total membership of the International Labor Defense?
Miss Damon: Approximately 300,000.
Mr. Whitley: Is that individual membership?
Miss Damon: No.
Mr. Whitley: Or affiliated membership?
Miss Damon. It is made up mostly of affiliated organizations — A. F. of L. trade unions, C. I. O. unions, and other organizations.
Mr. Whitley: How many branches does it have throughout the United States? ... Could you approximate it?
Miss Damon: I don't know. But we issue charters to them. The reason I say I don't know is that I can't be accurate about that. We issue charters, and some of them appear and disappear in smaller groups.
The Chairman: Let me see if I understand. You have affiliated groups with the International Labor Defense?
Miss Damon: That is right.
The Chairman: That is a loose affiliation, is it not? What do they do to affiliate? Do they pay dues?
Miss Damon: They send in an application asking to be affiliated with the International Labor Defense. They pay a fee for that, and they pay a regular fee, monthly or yearly—^it is not iron bound, or a specific fee; it is mostly on a voluntary basis.
The Chairman: Whatever they can afford to contribute?
Miss Damon: That is right ... There are two types of membership—affiliated and collective membership, and individual membership, that is made up in I.L.D. branches, like they have local unions—so we have branches of the I.L.D.
The Chairman. Well, how many individual members do you have?
Miss Damon: I can't say. That is very difficult to ascertain.

=== Members ===
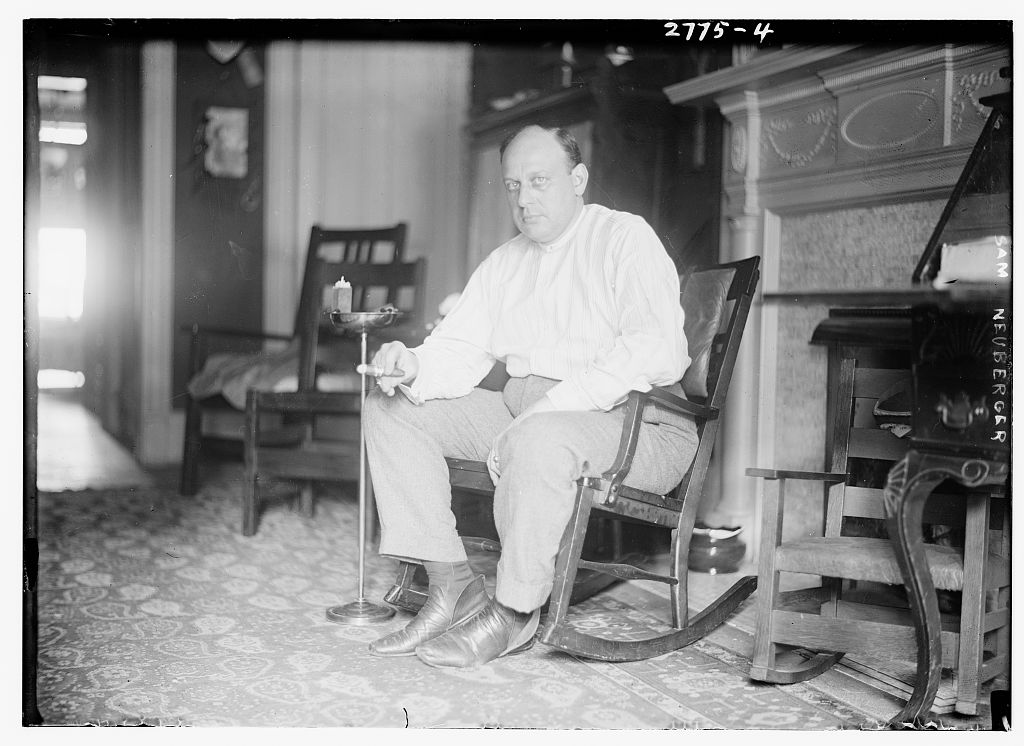
Samuel A. Neuberger (circa 1910–1913) was an ILD lawyer.

Samuel A. Neuberger was an ILD lawyer and represented Morris U. Cohen before the Rapp-Coudert Committee in 1941 and the US Senate Internal Security Subcommittee (SISS) in 1953.

=== Affiliations ===
During her 1939 testimony, Damon read from an ILD publication to declare that its only two affiliated groups were the American League for Peace and Democracy and the American Committee for the Protection of Foreign Born. She emphatically denied any affiliation with the Moscow-based International Red Aid or its American section.

== Publications (NYPL archive) ==
The ILD left behind several bodies of publications: organizational, public, and legal cases, archived at the New York Public Library. Organizational publications include conferences (1929–1943), board (1939–1949), and financials (1930–1945). Publications include: Hunger Fighter, Labor Defender, and Equal Justice.

=== Cases ===
Major cases include:

- Sacco-Vanzetti Case, 1926–1930
- Scottsboro Case, 1931–1946
- Tom Mooney Case, 1931–1939
- Case of Angelo Herndon, 1932–1937
- Case of the Gallup, New Mexico Coal Mine Workers, 1933–1938

=== Labor Defender (1926–1937) ===
Beginning in January 1926, the ILD published Labor Defender, as a monthly, profusely illustrated magazine with a low cover price of 10 cents. The circulation of the magazine boomed, rising from about 1,500 paid subscriptions and 8,500 copies in bulk bundle sales in 1927, to about 5,500 paid subscriptions with a bundle sale of 16,500 by the middle of 1928. This mid-1928 circulation figure was said by Assistant Secretary Marty Abern to be "greater than the combined circulation of The Daily Worker, Labor Unity, and The Communist combined.

Labor Defender depicted a black-and-white world of heroic trade unionists and dastardly factory owners, of oppressed African Americans struggling for freedom against the Ku Klux Klan and the use of state terror to stifle and divide and destroy all opposition. Writers included both non-party voices such as novelist Upton Sinclair, former Wobbly poet Ralph Chaplin, and Socialist Party leader Eugene V. Debs, as well as prominent Communists such as trade union leader William Z. Foster, cartoonist Robert Minor, and Benjamin Gitlow, a former political prisoner in New York.

The magazine made a constant plea for additional funds for jailed labor activists across the country. A regular column called "Voices from Prison" highlighted the plight of those behind bars and reinforced the message that good work was being done on the behalf of the so-called "class war prisoners" of America. In 1937, the magazine ceased.

=== Equal Justice (1938–1942) ===
The ILD published Equal Justice magazine from 1938 to 1942. Among other issues, it defended African-Americans against violence and discrimination.

=== Other publications ===
- Labor Defense Manifesto: Resolutions, Constitution Adopted by the First National Conference Held in Ashland Auditorium, Chicago, June 28, 1925. Chicago: International Labor Defense, n.d. [1925].
- The International Labor Defense: Its Constitution and Organization: Resolution Adopted by the Fourth National Convention Held in Pittsburgh, Pa., Dec. 29-31, 1929. New York: International Labor Defense, n.d. [1930].
- Louis Coleman, Night Riders in Gallup. New York: International Labor Defense, May 1935.

== See also ==
- Civil Rights Congress
- International Association of Democratic Lawyers
- International Red Aid (MOPR)
- Labor Defender magazine
- National Defense Committee
- National Federation for Constitutional Liberties
- National Lawyers Guild
- National Negro Congress
- Workers Defense Union

== External sources ==
- Martin Abern, "International Labor Defense Activities (1 January–1 July 1928)", in James P. Cannon and the Early Years of American Communism. Selected Writings and Speeches, 1920–1928. New York: Spartacist Publishing Company, 1992.
- Tim Davenport, "International Labor Defense (1925–1946): Organizational History", Early American Marxism website, www.marxisthistory.org/
- "People & Events: International Labor Defense", Public Broadcasting Service, 1999.
- IWW General Defense Committee official website, Industrial Workers of the World, www.iww.org/
- Glenda Elizabeth Gilmore, Defying Dixie: The Radical Roots of Civil Rights, 1919–1950. New York: W.W. Norton, 2008.
- Gerald Horne, Communist Front? The Civil Rights Congress, 1946–1956. Rutherford, NJ: Farleigh Dickinson University Press, 1988.
- Kenneth W. Mack, "Law and Mass Politics in the Making of the Civil Rights Lawyer, 1931–1941", Journal of American History, vol. 93, no. 1 (June 2006), pp. 37–62. In JSTOR
- Charles H. Martin, "Communists and Blacks: The ILD and The Angelo Herndon Case", Journal of Negro History, vol. 64, no. 2 (Spring 1979), pp. 131–141. In JSTOR
- Charles H. Martin, "The International Labor Defense and Black America", Labor History, vol. 26, no. 2 (1985), pp. 165–194.
- James A. Miller, Susan D. Pennybacker, and Eve Rosenhaft, "Mother Ada Wright and the International Campaign to Free the Scottsboro Boys, 1931–1934", American Historical Review, vol. 106, no. 2 (April 2001), pp. 387–430. .In JSTOR
- Hugh T. Murray, Jr., "The NAACP versus the Communist Party: The Scottsboro Rape Cases, 1931–1932", Phylon, vol. 28, no. 3 (QIII-1967), pp. 276–287. In JSTOR
- Eric W. Rise, "Race, Rape, and Radicalism: The Case of the Martinsville Seven, 1949–1951", Journal of Southern History, vol. 58, no. 3 (Aug. 1992), pp. 461–490. In JSTOR
- Jennifer Ruthanne Uhlmann, The Communist Civil Rights Movement: Legal Activism in the United States, 1919–1946. PhD dissertation. University of California, Los Angeles, 2007.
