= Civil Rights Congress =

United States civil rights organization for African-Americans (1946–56)

Civil Rights Congress (CRC)
- Predecessor: International Labor Defense (ILD); National Federation for Constitutional Liberties (NFCL); National Negro Congress (NNC)
- Founded: 1946
- Founder: William Patterson
- Dissolved: 1956
- Type: Non-profit organization

The Civil Rights Congress (CRC) was a United States civil rights organization, formed in 1946 at a national conference for radicals and disbanded in 1956. It succeeded the International Labor Defense, the National Federation for Constitutional Liberties, and the National Negro Congress, serving as a defense organization. Beginning about 1948, it became involved in representing African Americans sentenced to death and other highly prominent cases, in part to highlight racial injustice in the United States. After Rosa Lee Ingram and her two teenage sons were sentenced in Georgia, the CRC conducted a national appeals campaign on their behalf, their first for African Americans.

The CRC coordinated nationally, with 60 chapters at its peak in 1950. These acted on local issues. Most were located on the East and West coasts, with only about 10 chapters in the states of the former Confederacy, five of them in Texas.

== Overview ==
The CRC used a two-pronged strategy of litigation and demonstrations, with extensive public communications, to call attention to racial injustice in the United States. A major tactic was publicizing cases, especially in the South, such as those of Rosa Lee Ingram and her two sons in Georgia, the Martinsville Seven in Virginia, and Willie McGee in Mississippi, in which Black people had been sentenced to death; in the last two cases as a result of questionable rape charges. Given the disenfranchisement of blacks in the South at the turn of the century, all-white juries were standard, as only voters could serve.

The CRC succeeded particularly in raising international awareness about these cases, which sometimes generated protests to the president and Congress. They also represented defendants in legal appeals to overturn convictions or gain lesser sentences. At that time in the South, when cases were tried by all-white juries, some of the defense team believed that gaining a life sentence instead of capital punishment was akin to acquittal, where social pressure was high for juries to find blacks guilty. The CRC also defended political dissidents, including Communists. The group conducted high-profile protests in Washington, D.C., and at the United Nations. It brought world attention to racism in the United States by presenting the U.N. with a petition titled "We Charge Genocide," detailing the abuses of African Americans in the US, including continuing lynchings in the 1940s.

The CRC was perceived as an alternative or competitor to the National Association for the Advancement of Colored People (NAACP) because it worked on similar issues in representing African Americans in legal cases and suits. The CRC believed that it embraced a wider range of issues and a larger coalition. It became involved in the defense of Rosa Lee Ingram and her sons, and Willie McGee.

In 1950, while the NAACP was working on appeals of the Martinsville Seven, who had all been convicted and sentenced to death in speedy trials, the parents of one defendant, DeSales Grayson, appealed separately to the CRC to defend their son. The NAACP contended that the organizations had different approaches; it spent more of its funds on direct defense of clients, including appeals, whereas the CRC mounted a public campaign, complete with distribution of pamphlets and advertising on billboards.

Because the CRC had attracted adverse attention from the government, with the potential to negatively affect reception of appeals in the Martinsville Seven case, the CRC withdrew from direct defense of Grayson in July 1950. But, the NAACP was unable to succeed with its appeals. All seven of the men were executed in February 1951.

During the years of the Red Scare, due to its Communist Party affiliations, the CRC was classified as subversive and described as a communist front organization by US Attorney General Thomas Clark under President Harry S. Truman, as well as by the House Committee on Un-American Activities. Targeted by the U.S. government, the group was weakened in 1951, and it finally disbanded in 1956.

== Organization ==
The group was formed at a radical conference in Detroit held on April 27–28, 1946. Early goals included abolition of HUAC and protecting southern workers' right to unionize. In December 1947, the National Negro Congress merged into the group. International Labor Defense (ILD) national secretary William Patterson led the group throughout its existence. Frank Marshall Davis served on the organization's National Executive Board. Patterson also headed the Abraham Lincoln School in Chicago, with Davis also on the faculty and Board of Directors.

The group gained about 10,000 members at its peak. It was generally stronger on the coasts and weak in the South, but it did conduct several major campaigns to defend the legal rights of Southern Blacks. Its largest and strongest chapters in the South were in New Orleans and Miami. Altogether, the CRC founded more than 60 local chapters which sought to combat racial discrimination, racist stereotyping, and legal injustice in their communities.

The U.S. Congress and courts weakened the group with legal restrictions in 1951. In 1956, members voted to disband.

== Legal defense cases ==
The CRC took up legal causes of those they considered unjustly accused. In addition to pursuing legal campaigns, often alongside the NAACP, the group sought to raise awareness outside the courtroom with demonstrations, propaganda, and high-profile events. As these campaigns gained popular awareness, the CRC received many letters from prisoners requesting legal assistance.

=== Resisting anti-communism ===
The CRC opposed the 1940 Smith Act and 1950 McCarran Act, both of which expanded government powers to prosecute domestic dissent. It generally came to the assistance of individuals targeted by HUAC, particularly the "Top Eleven" communist leaders tried in 1949 under the Smith Act.

The CRC was also active in the defense of Harry Bridges, a union organizer and leader of the California chapter of the International Longshore and Warehouse Union. The government had long sought his deportation, and Congress passed the Smith Act to provide a means to accomplish this. After Bridges became a naturalized US citizen in 1945, the government prosecuted him for perjury for having failed to acknowledge being a member of the Communist Party in his naturalization application. The conviction was overturned due to a statute of limitations in the law.

=== Death penalty cases in the South ===
==== Rosa Lee Ingram ====
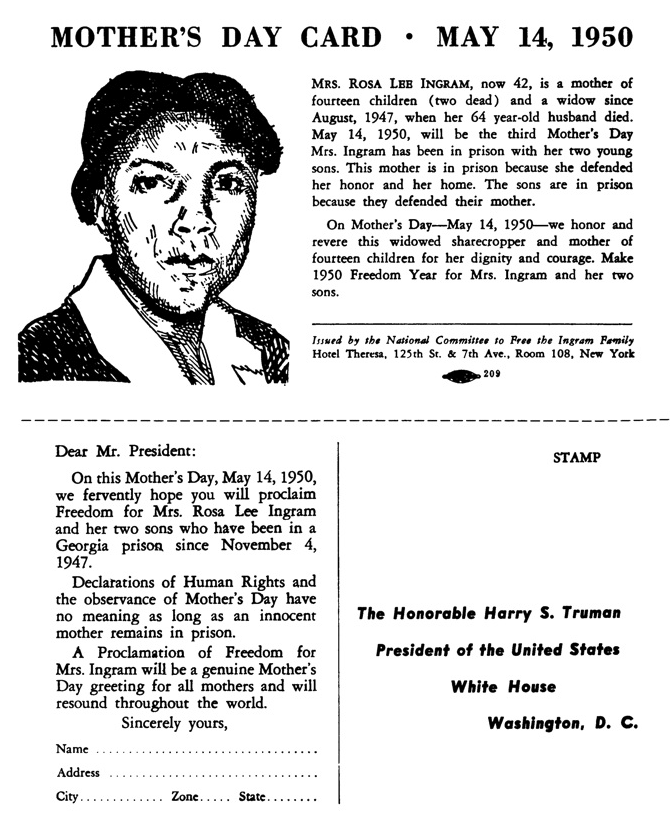
Mother's Day card to President Truman, part of the CRC's campaign to free Rosa Lee Ingram

The CRC campaigned for Rosa Lee Ingram and her two teenage sons (Wallace and Sammie Lee Ingram) against a death penalty murder charge in Georgia, the first African Americans for whom they campaigned on a national level for an appeal. The Ingrams, who were sharecroppers, were accused of murdering their white neighbor, John Ethron Stratford, in 1947 over an argument about animals on his land and his sexual harassment of the mother, Rosa Lee. They had been convicted—on the basis of circumstantial testimony, with no eyewitnesses—by a jury of twelve white men after a one-day trial in January 1948. The Ingrams had no access to lawyers before the trial.

The Ingram appeal campaign was orchestrated by the Women's Committee for Equal Justice, a CRC subdivision led by the nationally known leader, Mary Church Terrell. As its predecessor, the ILD, had accomplished with the Scottsboro case, the CRC hoped to use the Ingram case to draw national and international attention to racial inequality in the United States. Pressure from the CRC and the NAACP led to a new hearing in March 1948. In this hearing, the judge denied requests for a new trial, but used his discretion to reduce the sentence from death to life in prison.

The NAACP and CRC came into occasional conflict over the case because of differing goals and strategy. By the wishes of the Ingrams, the NAACP generally handled the legal side; the CRC worked mostly on publicity. It raised $45,125 for the Ingram Defense Fund and held annual Mother's Day rallies. On 21 September 1949, Terrell led a group to the United Nations to demand that officials address the Ingram case. Little progress was made in the case, but both the NAACP and the CRC continued to support Ingram during her imprisonment. Ingram and her sons were all released on parole in 1959, cited as "model prisoners."

==== Martinsville Seven and Willie McGee ====
As in the Ingram case, both the NAACP and the CRC rallied to the cause of the Martinsville Seven—seven black men all sentenced to death in Virginia in 1949 for the rape of a white woman. Only black men received the death sentence in Virginia in rape cases. Martin A. Martin, the chief lawyer hired by the NAACP from a major Richmond law firm, refused to work with the CRC because the government had classified the group as subversive and as a Communist front.

Again excluded from the legal process, the CRC launched a national campaign based on injustices in the cases of Martinsville Seven and Willie McGee in Mississippi. McGee was also sentenced to death for conviction of rape of a white woman. The CRC created national attention and coordinated mailing campaigns to the government in Washington, DC, but the appeals failed. The US Supreme Court refused to hear the Martinsville Seven case, and all the men were executed in February 1951. McGee was executed in May 1951.

In this period, the CRC was defending Communist officials known as the Top Eleven against prosecution under the Smith Act. This drew attention to their communist affiliation and people worried that the CRC endangered the outcome of the appeals for that reason. It withdrew from representing one of the Martinsville Seven directly.

== Other issues ==
The CRC took stances on many issues related to political freedom and the rights of African Americans. It supported anti-lynching laws, and condemned the use of the Confederate flag at many government and school facilities in the South.

It opposed U.S. intervention in the Korean War. The CRC opposed the Taft-Hartley Act and offered assistance to the Congress of Industrial Organizations and to the American Federation of Labor.

In Louisiana, a local chapter launched a major campaign to convict the white police officer who shot Roy Cyril Brooks. The Brooks case began a larger effort against police brutality and demands to hire more Black police officers in cities such as New Orleans.

== Actions ==
=== Freedom Crusade ===
In January 1949, the group held a "Freedom Crusade" in Washington, D.C., right before the re-inauguration of President Truman. Before the demonstration, the group had a public exchange with Congressperson John S. Wood. Wood accused the group of threatening "violence and riot" in the capital; the group responded that the white supremacy of the status quo "is constantly the scene of 'violence and riot' against Negro citizens." The Freedom Crusade was ultimately an orderly demonstration in which several thousand people visited elected politicians to demand action against lynching, freedom for communist leaders imprisoned for subversion (known as the Top Eleven), and implementation of the Fair Employment Practices Commission.

=== We Charge Genocide ===
In 1951, the Civil Rights Congress issued its petition to the United Nations entitled "We Charge Genocide: The Crime of Government Against the Negro People". This document collected diverse instances of violence and mistreatment against African Americans, and argued that the United States government was a party to genocide in its own country. After William Patterson presented the document to the United Nations assembly in Paris, his passport was revoked by the State Department. Paul Robeson and W. E. B. Du Bois were blocked from traveling, and went to the U.N. offices in New York.

== Labeled as Communist ==
Soon after it was founded, the CRC became a target of the House Committee on Un-American Activities (HUAC) and the Internal Revenue Service. A 1947 report to HUAC charged: "Having adopted a line of militant skullduggery against the United States with the close of World War II, the Communist Party has set up the Civil Rights Congress for the purpose of protecting those of its members who run afoul of the law." The group denied these charges and provided a list of sponsors, including Representatives Adam C. Powell, Senator Glen H. Taylor, and Atlanta University President Rufus Early Clement. Patterson called the group "non-partisan" and described it as "the Red Cross of the defenders of peace, constitutional rights, justice and human rights".

The 1950 McCarran Internal Security Act increased government persecution of the group, and many of its leaders were jailed. The group's power weakened in 1951 when the federal government barred it from posting bail for communist defendants in the resulting trials. During the Second Red Scare, many Americans wary of the group because of its communist connections. In 1956, the CRC was declared a communist front by the Subversive Activities Control Board. It disbanded the same year.

The CRC was also infiltrated by the Federal Bureau of Investigation. FBI agent Matt Cvetic, who had joined the Communist Party, testified to HUAC in 1950 that the CRC was Communist-controlled and that Patterson was a Communist. He also identified a long list of politicians as Communist, as well as celebrities and community leaders. Various other agents surfaced to testify at anti-Communist trials. Association with the Civil Rights Congress served as justification for FBI surveillance of Lena Horne and Paul Robeson. One agent later described breaking into the CRC's Chicago offices, saying "Anything that had the name 'committee' or 'congress' the FBI assumed had to be subversive."

David Brown, secretary and then chair of the Los Angeles chapter of the CRC, served as an FBI informant from 1950 to 1954. He disappeared in January 1955 and tried to fake his own kidnapping. Soon after, he unsuccessfully attempted suicide in a hotel room. He later said he felt ashamed and suicidal for being a "stool pigeon". He testified that his pay varied from $25/week to $250/month, and that he routinely lied to FBI contacts.

== Publications ==
Pamphlets

- Argument to the Jury of Richard Gladstein in the New York Communist Trial (1942) 18 p.
- America's "Thought Police": Record of the Un-American Activities Commission (October 1947)

A call for opposition to the Thomas-Rankin House Committee. Foreword by Henry A. Wallace. 46 p.

- Garlin, Sender. Red Tape and Barbed Wire: Close-Up of the McCarran Law In Action (September 1952)

Introduction by William L. Patterson.

== See also ==
- O. John Rogge

== Footnotes ==
=== Sources ===
- Horne, Gerald. Communist Front? The Civil Rights Congress, 1946–1956. Rutherford, NJ: Associated University Presses, 1988. ISBN 0-8386-3285-8.
