= Willie McGee (convict) =

African American man executed in 1951

- Born: c. 1916; Pachuta, Mississippi, U.S.
- Died: May 8, 1951 (aged 35); Laurel, Mississippi, U.S.
- Known for: Controversial conviction and execution
- Spouse: Eliza Patton (m. 1935; div. 1946)
- Children: 4
- Status: Executed by electrocution
- Conviction: Rape
- Penalty: Death

Willie McGee (c. 1916 – May 8, 1951) was an African American man from Laurel, Mississippi, who was sentenced to death in 1945 and executed on Tuesday, May 8, 1951, after being controversially convicted for the rape of a white woman on November 2, 1945. McGee's legal case became a cause célèbre that attracted worldwide attention, as it was roundly decried as a miscarriage of justice in the Jim Crow South.

== Early life ==
Willie McGee was born in Pachuta, Mississippi, around 1916 to Bessie and Jasper McGee Sr., who was a laborer at Eastman Gardiner Lumber Company. He had one brother, Jasper McGee Jr. McGee lived with his parents and brother at 64 3d Red Line, an area of segregated colored company housing. McGee attended local, segregated schools for a short time before working. He married Eliza Jane Patton on April 15, 1935. McGee had four children with Patton: Willie Earl, Della, Gracie Lee, and Mary.

== Arrest ==
On November 3, 1945, McGee was arrested in Hattiesburg, Mississippi, on a charge of grand larceny for stealing a truck owned by the Laurel Wholesale Grocery, where he was employed. Two of his friends placed him in the vicinity at the time of a rape of white resident Willette Hawkins in her home, leading to him being questioned about the rape. On November 9, 1945, McGee was charged with the rape. In late 1945 or early 1946, McGee claimed to his lawyer that it had been a consensual affair. Rosalee McGee, who claimed to be his wife, later added that McGee only agreed to the affair under threat that Hawkins would accuse him of rape if he refused her advances. It was reported that he had made an oral confession shortly after his arrest. This confession was attested to by the county attorney and other members of the local political power structure. McGee and his supporters would later argue that any such confession was made under duress.

The only evidence that McGee and Hawkins had a consensual affair was an affidavit submitted by Rosalee McGee. However, Rosalee was later exposed as a fraud. Her real name was Rosetta Saffold. She had never married McGee or even met him until after his conviction, and had been recruited by the Civil Rights Congress to pretend to be his wife to boost public sympathy for him. The Daily Worker was later sued by Hawkins for claiming that she had forced McGee into a sexual relationship. In 1955, after failing to find any evidence of an affair, the Daily Worker settled with Hawkins, agreeing to pay her $5,000 in installments over ten weeks and to print two apologies.

== Trials ==
=== First trial ===
On Monday, December 3, 1945, McGee was indicted by the grand jury on a charge of rape, was arraigned in the circuit court, and a plea of not guilty was entered for him by the district attorney.

The prosecution charged that McGee kept the money from a Laurel Wholesale Grocery delivery he made, and used it to buy whiskey. The next morning, police claimed that employees of the grocery store found McGee asleep in the delivery truck. He was picked up in Hattiesburg by the police the next afternoon. The jury deliberated for only two and a half minutes to return the guilty verdict. On December 11, 1945, McGee was sentenced to death.

The first trial initially attracted wide attention because National Guard troops were needed to escort the defendant from the Hinds County jail to Laurel, in Jones County. There were credible rumors of a white supremacist lynch mob that sought to break him out of the Laurel jail. At the time, lynch mobs and vigilante justice were common in the south, and even some liberal southerners tacitly supported mob justice. The trial was conducted under the protection of the troops and a military caravan returned McGee to Jackson by nightfall.

Attorney Forrest B. Jackson stated that McGee's constitutional rights were violated during his trial and filed an appeal. Ultimately, the Mississippi Supreme Court found that the trial had violated McGee's rights because the trial court failed to consider McGee's motion for a change of venue. A new trial was scheduled.

=== Second trial ===
The second trial was set for November 4, 1946, on the charge of rape which was a capital offense in Mississippi. No white men in Mississippi had ever been sentenced to death for rape, but Black men were often executed when convicted for the rape of white women. McGee again applied for a change of venue. This time, Judge John C. Stennis (later a U.S. Senator from Mississippi for 42 years) granted the motion and the case was moved to Forrest County (Hattiesburg). At that trial, after 11 minutes of deliberation, the all-white jury again returned a guilty verdict. Judge Burkitt Collins again sentenced McGee to death by electric chair, to be carried out on December 20, 1946. On November 23, 1946, McGee's attorney filed an appeal. Again, the Mississippi Supreme Court overturned the verdict. This time it ruled that Jones County's practice of excluding African-American citizens from its grand juries violated the Equal Protection Clause of the 14th Amendment.

=== Third trial ===
McGee's third trial began on February 16, 1948. For the first time in Jones County history, African Americans were registered as part of the 18-man grand jury, with three Black jurors included. However, decades after the trial, one of the prosecutors allegedly boasted that they had changed the roll of grand jurors to falsely include two Black doctors whom they knew would remain silent. Yet again, no Black people served on the actual jury; the sole Black member of the jury pool, a physician, requested and was granted excusal by the court.

Testimony alleged that McGee entered Willette Hawkins's home through an outside window. It was suggested that he then violently assaulted and strangled her. The prosecution suggested that he then raced away in the stolen truck that he had parked some distance from the home. The prosecution played on the racial fears of a southern white jury by appealing to the stereotype of a sexually deviant and rapacious Black man. The testimony of Willette Hawkins's husband was that their baby had been sick that night and that neither went to bed before 4 a.m., and then he occupied a back room 25 to 30 feet away from his wife's room. He had evidently heard nothing of this break in and violent assault until his wife came and woke him.

In her statement to the police, Hawkins said that her attacker had threatened to kill her and her infant daughter if she made any noise.

Trial testimony of the alleged companion of McGee on the night of the assault stated he was on a wild joyride in the wholesale grocery truck McGee was driving. He testified that they drove around and returned to Laurel after consuming three half-pints of whiskey on the jaunt. They visited gambling houses in Laurel and left a house in "The Bottoms" about 4:00 am in the truck. He said that he left McGee and the truck at Masonite Drive and arrived at his own home half a block away at 4:15 am. Prosecutors played on the white jurors' racial stereotypes by suggesting that McGee had told another companion a few days before the rape, "I'm going to get me a white woman".

After deliberating within less than an hour, on March 6, 1948, the jury returned to the court room with a guilty verdict. When the judge asked if McGee had anything to say, he responded, "Thank you, Judge, I have no fear." The execution was set by Judge F. Burkitt Collins for Friday, April 9, 1948.

== Stays of execution ==
Justice Sidney Smith of the state's highest court stayed the execution for June 3, 1949. On June 3, 1949, McGee was granted another stay of execution five hours before he was scheduled to die. McGee was then scheduled for execution on July 27, 1950.

After his conviction, McGee was defended by the Civil Rights Congress (CRC), which mounted a public campaign as well as filing legal appeals of his case. In the local Black community, it was thought that McGee may have had a consensual relationship with Willette Hawkins, but these thoughts were too incendiary to be brought up at trial. The son of the prosecutor in the case has stated that McGee told his father that he had sex with Hawkins, but that "she was just as guilty."

In Jessica Mitford's A Fine Old Conflict, autobiographical book on her time in the American Communist Party, Mitford includes a detailed account of the campaign by the CRC to save McGee's life. Mitford and other women went door-to-door to raise local support for McGee's innocence, including a long interview with the writer William Faulkner, who described the case as an outrage, and said that the proposed execution of McGee was "giving obeisance to a fetish of long standing". Faulkner would later write to a friend that he was wrong, he spoke out of turn, and he knew too little of the facts of the matter to go on record.

July 24, 1950, Bella Abzug, then a young attorney for the Civil Rights Congress, represented McGee's appeals in Mississippi and before the US Supreme Court in one of the first civil rights cases of her legal career. Supreme Court Justice Harold Burton ordered the fourth stay on July 26, 1950, creating an international affair; however the full U.S. Supreme Court refused to hear McGee's final appeal.

Lawyer Aubrey Grossman attempted to get a stay of execution. However, he was attacked while attempting to do so.

Mississippi newspapers alleged that the segregationist Governor, Fielding L. Wright, was threatened with death from the 'Northern Communists'. Wright was an ardent white supremacist and segregationist, and these claims of 'Communist Agitation' were commonly used in the Jim Crow South.

== Public figures ==
Author William Faulkner wrote a letter insisting the case against McGee was unproven. His remarks were quoted by McGee's supporters for the purpose of gathering local backing for McGee. Other notable public figures that spoke out were Civil Rights Congress activist Paul Robeson, and Civil Rights activist Josephine Baker.

== Execution ==
The night before McGee was electrocuted on May 8, 1951, by the state of Mississippi, he wrote a farewell letter to Rosetta Saffold (alias Rosalee McGee):

Tell the people the real reason they are going to take my life is to keep the Negro down... They can't do this if you and the children keep on fighting. Never forget to tell them why they killed their daddy. I know you won't fail me. Tell the people to keep on fighting. Your true husband, Will McGee.

Among the 60 men watching him die were the husband of Willette Hawkins, her brother, and two of her brothers-in-law. The press was allowed to attend the execution. A crowd of more than 1500 were on the courthouse lawn. The execution was broadcast on radio.

== See also ==
- Scottsboro Boys
- Martinsville Seven
- The Central Park Five
- False accusations of rape as justification for lynchings
- List of people executed in the United States in 1951
- List of people executed by electrocution
