= List of organizations historically described as communist fronts by the United States government =

Groups designated by the American federal government

This list of organizations historically described as communist fronts by the United States government includes the names of groups included in various reports of the attorney general of the United States or House Un-American Activities Committee listing "subversive" or "communist" front groups. While some of these were documentable mass organizations of the Communist Party USA, many were included out of convenience or political expedience.

Inclusion on any of these lists should not be regarded as definitive proof of covert organizational ties or actual subversive intent.

== 1948 Attorney General's list ==
- Abraham Lincoln Brigade
- Abraham Lincoln School, Chicago, Illinois
- Action Committee to Free Spain Now
- Alabama People's Educational Association
- American Association for Reconstruction in Yugoslavia Inc.
- American Branch of the Federation of Greek Maritime Unions
- American Committee for Protection of Foreign Born
- American Committee for Spanish Freedom
- American Committee for the Settlement of Jews in Birbidjan, Inc.
- American Committee for Yugoslav Relief Inc.
- American Committee to Survey Labor Conditions in Europe
- American Committee for a Democratic Greece
- American Council on Soviet Relations
- American Jewish Labor Council
- American League Against War and Fascism
- American League for Peace and Democracy
- American Peace Crusade
- American Peace Mobilization
- American Poles for Peace
- American Polish Labor Council
- American Polish League
- American Rescue Ship Mission
- American Russian Institute
- American Russian Institute, Philadelphia
- American Russian Institute of San Francisco
- American Russian Institute of Southern California, Los Angeles
- American Slav Congress
- American Women for Peace
- American Youth Congress
- American Youth for Democracy
- Armenian Progressive League of America
- Benjamin Davis Freedom Committee
- Boston School for Marxist Studies
- Bridges-Robertson-Schmidt Defense Committee
- Bulgarian American People's League of the United States of America
- California Emergency Defense Committee
- California Labor School Inc., San Francisco
- Carpatho-Russian People's Society
- Cervantes Fraternal Society
- China Welfare Appeal Inc.
- Chopin Cultural Center
- Citizens Committee for Harry Bridges
- Citizens Committee of the Upper West Side, New York City
- Citizens Committee to free Earl Browder
- Citizens Emergency Defense Committee
- Citizens Protective League
- Civil Liberties Sponsoring Committee of Pittsburgh
- Civil Rights Congress
- Comite Coordinador Pro Republica Española
- Comite Pro Derechos Civiles
- Committee for a Democratic Far Eastern Policy
- Committee for Constitutional and Political Freedom
- Committee for Peace and Brotherhood Festival in Philadelphia
- Committee for the Defense of the Pittsburgh Six
- Committee for the Negro in the Arts
- Committee for the Protection of the Bill of Rights
- Committee for World Youth Friendship and Cultural Exchange
- Committee to Abolish Discrimination in Maryland
- Committee to Defend the Rights and Freedom of Pittsburgh's Political Prisoners
- Committee to Uphold the Bill of Rights, Commonwealth College, Mena, Arkansas
- Communist Party, USA, its subdivisions, subsidiaries and affiliates
- Communist Political Association, its subdivisions, subsidiaries and affiliates including:
  - Alabama People's Educational Association
  - Florida Press and Educational League
  - Oklahoma League for Political Education
  - People's Educational and Press Association of Texas
  - Virginia League for People's Education
- Congress against Discrimination
- Congress of American Revolutionary Writers
- Congress of American Women Congress of the Unemployed
- Connecticut Committee to Aid Victims of the Smith Act
- Connecticut Ste Youth Conference]]
- Council for Jobs, Relief and Housing
- Council for Pan-American Democracy
- Council of Greek American
- Council on African Affairs
- Daily Worker Press Club
- Dennis Defense Committee
- Detroit Youth Assembly
- East Bay Peace Committee
- Emergency Committee to Save Spanish Refugees
- Everybody's Committee to Outlaw War
- Families of the Baltimore Smith Act Victim
- Families of the Smith Act Victims
- Finnish-American Mutual Aid Society
- Frederick Douglass Educational Center
- Freedom Stage, Inc.
- Friends of the Soviet Union
- George Washington Carver School, New York City
- Harlem Trade Union Council
- Hawaii Civil Liberties Committee
- Hellenic-American Brotherhood
- Hollywood Writers Mobilization for Democracy
- Hungarian-American Council for Democracy
- Hungarian Brotherhood
- Idaho Pension Union
- Independent Party, Seattle
- Industrial Workers of the World
- International Labor Defense
- International Workers Order, its subdivisions, subsidiaries and affiliates
- Jewish Culture Society
- Jewish People's Committee
- Jewish People's Fraternal Order
- Joint Anti-Fascist Refugee Committee
- Joseph Weydemeyer School of Social Science, St. Louis
- Labour Council for Negro Rights
- Labor Research Association
- Labor Youth League
- League for Common Sense
- League of American Writers
- Macedonian-American People's League
- Maritime Labor Committee to Defend Al Lannon
- Massachusetts Committee for the Bill of Rights
- Massachusetts Minute Women for Peace
- Maurice Braverman Defense Committee
- Michigan Civil Rights Federation
- Michigan Council for Peace
- Michigan School of Social Science
- National Association of Mexican Americans
- National Committee for Freedom of the Press
- National Committee for the Defense of Political Prisoners
- National Committee to Win Amnesty for Smith Act Victims
- National Committee to Win the Peace
- National Conference on American Policy in China and the Far East
- National Council for American-Soviet Friendship
- National Federation for Constitutional Liberties
- National Labor Conference for Peace
- National Negro Congress
- National Negro Labor Council
- Nature Friends of America
- Negro Labor Victory Committee
- New Committee for Publications
- North American Committee to Aid Spanish Democracy
- North American Spanish Aid Committee
- North Philadelphia Forum
- Ohio School of Social Sciences
- Oklahoma Committee to Defend Political Prisoners
- Pacific Northwest Labor School, Seattle
- Palo Alto Peace Club
- Peace Information Center
- Peace Movement of Ethiopia
- People's Drama, Inc.
- People's Educational Association (Los Angeles Educational Center)
- People's Institute of Applied Religion
- People's Programs, Seattle
- People's Radio Foundation, Inc.
- Philadelphia Labor Committee for Negro Rights
- Philadelphia School of Social Science and Art
- Photo League
- Pittsburgh Art Club
- Political Prisoners' Welfare Committee
- Polonia Society of the IWO
- Proletarian Party of America
- Protestant War Veterans of the USA
- Provisional Committee of Citizens for Peace, Southwest Area Provisional Committee on Latin American Affairs
- Quad City Committee for Peace
- Queensborough Tenants League
- Revolutionary Workers League
- Romanian-American Fraternal Society
- Russian American Society, Inc.
- Samuel Adams School, Boston
- Santa Barbara Peace Forum
- Schappes Defense Committee
- Schneiderman-Darcy Defense Committee
- School of Jewish Studies
- Seattle Labor School
- Serbian-American Fraternal Society
- Serbian Vidovidan Council
- Slavic Council of Southern California
- Slovak Workers Society
- Slovenian-American National Council
- Socialist Workers Party including:
  - American Committee for European Workers' Relief
- Southern Negro Youth Congress
- Syracuse Women for Peace
- Tom Paine School of Westchester, New York
- Trade Union Committee for Peace
- Trade Unionists for Peace
- Tri-State Negro Trade Union Council
- Ukrainian-American Fraternal Union
- Union of New York Veterans
- United American Spanish Aid Committee
- United Committee of Jewish Societies and Landsmannschaft
- United Committee of South Slavic American
- United Defense Council of Southern California
- United Harlem Tenants and Consumers Organization
- United May Day Committee
- United Negro and Allied Veterans of America
- United World Federalists
- Veterans of the Abraham Lincoln Brigade
- Virginia League for People's Education
- Voice of Freedom Committee
- Walt Whitman School of Social Science, Newark, New Jersey
- Washington Bookshop Association
- Washington Committee for Democratic Action
- Washington Committee to Defend the Bill of Rights
- Washington Commonwealth Federation
- Washington Pension Union
- Wisconsin Conference on Social Legislation
- Workers Alliance Yiddisher Kultur Farband
- Young Communist League
- Yugoslav-American Cooperative Home, Inc.
- Yugoslav Seamen's Club, Inc.

== 1961 HUAC guide ==
On December 1, 1961, the House Un-American Activities Committee (HUAC) published a 288-page book entitled Guide to Subversive Organizations and Publications. This massive list, annotated with notes documenting the first official government mention of alleged communist affiliation, superseded a very similar list published on January 2, 1957. The style of the publication follows that of a 1948 HUAC pamphlet, Citations by Official Government Agencies of Organizations and Publications Found to be Communist or Communist Fronts.

- Abolish Peonage Committee
- Abraham Lincoln Brigade
- Abraham Lincoln School, Chicago
- Action Committee to Free Spain Now
- Adolph Larson-Ruby Hynes Defense Committee
- Alabama Peoples Educational Association
- Albanian-American Committee for Protection of Foreign Born
- Alex Bittelman Defense Committee
- All-America Anti-Imperialist League
- All-California Conference for Defense of Civil Rights and Aid to Labor's Prisoners
- Allied Labor News Service
- Almanac Singers
- Ambijan Committee for Emergency Aid to the Soviet Union
- American Association for Reconstruction in Yugoslavia, Inc.
- American Branch of the Federation of Greek Maritime Unions
- American Committee for a Free Yugoslavia
- American Committee for Democracy and Intellectual Freedom
- American Committee for European Workers' Relief
- American Committee for Friendship with the Soviet Union
- American Committee to Survey Trade Union Conditions in Europe
- American Continental Congress for Peace
- American Council for a Democratic Greece
- American Council on Soviet Relations
- American Croatian Congress
- American Federation of Labor Trade Union Committee for Unemployment Insurance and Relief
- American Friends of Spanish Democracy
- American Friends of the Chinese People
- American Friends of the Mexican People
- American Fund for Public Service
- American Jewish Labor Council
- American Labor Alliance
- American Labor Party
- American League Against War and Fascism
- American League for Peace and Democracy
- American Negro Labor Congress
- American Peace Appeal
- American Peace Crusade
- American Peace Mobilization
- American People's Congress and Exposition for Peace (Chicago: June 29 – July 1, 1951)
- American People's Fund
- American People's Meeting
- American People's Mobilization
- American-Polish Committee for Protection of Foreign Born
- American Polish Labor Council
- American Relief Ship for Spain
- American Rescue Ship Mission
- American-Rumanian Film Corp.
- American-Russian Fraternal Society
- American-Russian Institute, New York
- American Russian Institute, Philadelphia
- American Russian Institute of San Francisco
- American Russian Institute of Southern California, Los Angeles
- American-Russian Trading Corp. (Amtorg)
- American Serbian Committee for Relief of War Orphans in Yugoslavia
- American Slav Congress
- American Society for Cultural Relations with Russia
- American Society for Technical Aid to Spanish Democracy
- American-Soviet Science Society
- American Sponsoring Committee for Representation at the Second World Peace Congress
- American Student Union
- American Students Repudiate Aggression in Russia
- American Technical Aid Society
- American Veterans for Peace
- American Women for Peace
- American Workers Party (1933–1934)
- American Writers Congress
- American Youth Congress
- American Youth for a Free World
- American Youth for Democracy
- American Youth Peace Crusade
- American-Yugoslav Committee for Protection of Foreign Born
- Armenian Progressive League of America
- Artists' Front to Win the War
- Association of Interns and Medical Students
- Baltimore County Committee for Peace
- Baltimore Youth for Peace
- Bay Area Committee to Save the Rosenbergs
- Bay Area Rosenberg-Sobell Committee
  - 345 Franklin Street, San Francisco, California
- Bay Area Council of Sobell Committees
- Bay Cities Committee for Protection of Foreign Born
- Book Union
- Boston Committee to Secure Clemency for the Rosenbergs
- Boston School for Marxist Studies
- Bridges-Robertson-Schmidt Defense Committee
- Briehl's Farm, near Wallkill, New York
- Bronx Victory Labor Committee
- Brookwood Labor College
- Bulgarian-American Committee for Protection of Foreign Born
- California Emergency Defense Committee
- California Labor School, San Francisco and Los Angeles
- Cambridge Youth Council
- Camp Arcadia
- Camp Beacon
- Camp Kinderland, Hopewell Junction, New York
- Camp Lakeland, Hopewell Junction, New York
- Camp Timberline, Jewett, New York
- Camp Unity, Wingdale, New York
- Camp Woodland, Phoenicia, New York
- Carpatho-Russian Peoples Society
- Central Council of American Women of Croatian Descent
- Cervantes Fraternal Society
- Charles Doyle Defense Committee
- Charles Rowoldt Defense Committee
- Chicago Committee to Secure Justice in the Rosenberg Case
- Chicago Greek Committee for Protection of Foreign Born
- Chicago Jewish Committee for Protection of Foreign Born
- Chicago Labor Defense Committee
- Chicago Sobell Committee
- China Aid Council
- Citizens Committee for Constitutional Liberties
- Citizens' Committee for Harry Bridges
- Citizens' Committee of the Upper West Side, New York City
- Citizens' Committee to Free Earl Browder
- Citizens Committee to Preserve American Freedoms
- Civil Rights Congress
- Civil Rights Congress Bail Funds
- Civil Rights Division of Mobilization for Democracy
- Clatsop County Committee for Protection of Foreign Born, Oregon
- Cleveland Committee to Secure Clemency for the Rosenbergs
- Colorado Committee to Protect Civil Liberties
- Colorado Peace Council
- Columbus Peace Association
- Comite Coordinator por Republica Española
- Committee for a Democratic Far Eastern Policy
- Committee for Citizenship Rights
- Committee for Civil Rights for Communists
- Committee for Concerned Peace Efforts
- Committee for Defense of Greek-Americans
- Committee for Defense of Martin Karasek, Bettendorf, Iowa
- Committee for Defense of Morning Freiheit Writers
- Committee for Defense of Public Education
- Committee for International Student Cooperation
- Committee for Peace Through World Cooperation
- Committee for Peaceful Alternatives to the Atlantic Pact
  - Conference for Peaceful Alternatives to the Atlantic Pact
- Committee for the Defense of Eulalia Figueiredo, New Bedford, Massachusetts
- Committee for the Freedom of Martin Young
- Committee for the Freedom of Sam Milgrom
- Committee for United States Participation in the American Continental Congress for Peace
- Committee in Defense of Henry Podolski, Detroit
- Committee of Philadelphia Women for Peace
- Committee of Professional Groups for Browder and Ford
- Committee on Election Rights
- Committee to Aid the Fighting South
- Committee to Defend America by Keeping Out of War
- Committee to Defend Angelo Herndon
- Committee to Defend Chungsoon and Choon Cha Kwak
- Committee to Defend Hazel Wolf
- Committee to Defend Lincoln Veterans
- Committee to Defend Mike Daniels
- Committee to Defend Toma Babin
- Committee to End Sedition Laws
- Committee to Protect Joseph Mankin's Citizenship
- Committee to Repeal the Walter-McCarran Law and Stop Deportation of Sam and Fanny Mankewitz
- Committee to Repeal the Walter-McCarran Law and to Protect the Foreign Born, Philadelphia
- Committee to Save the Life of John Juhn
- Commonwealth College, Mena, Arkansas
- Communist Information Bureau
- Communist Labor Party of America
- Communist League of America (Opposition)
- Communist League of Struggle
- Communist Party of America (1919–1923)
- Communist Party of the United States of America
- Communist Party, USA (Majority Group)
  - Communist Party, USA (Opposition)
  - Independent Communist Labor League of America
  - Independent Labor League of America
- Communist Political Association (1944–1945)
- Community Unitarian Fellowship
- Conference for Legislation in the National Interest
- Conference for Progressive Labor Action
- Conference on Constitutional Liberties in America
- Conference on Pan-American Democracy
- Congress of the Mexican and Spanish-American Peoples of the United States, (Albuquerque: March 24 – 26, 1939)
- Congress of Revolutionary Writers
- Congress of American-Soviet Friendship
- Congress of American Women
- Connecticut State Youth Conference
- Connecticut Volunteers for Civil Rights
- Consumers' National Federation
- Coordinating Committee to Lift the Embargo (Spanish)
- Council for Pan-American Democracy
- Council of United States Veterans
- Council of Young Southerners
- Council on African Affairs
- Croatian Benevolent Fraternity
- Cultural and Scientific Conference for World Peace
- Czechoslovak Committee for Protection of Foreign Born
- Daily Worker Press Club
- Daniels DEfense Committee, North Carolina
- Delegates' National Assembly for Peace (Washington, DC: April 1, 1952)
- Dennis Defense Committee
- Denver Peace Council
- Descendants of the American Revolution
- Detroit Bill of Rights Defense Committee
- Detroit Committee for Protection of Foreign Born
- Detroit Committee to Secure Justice in the Rosenberg Case
- Detroit Youth Assembly
- Dora Coleman Defense Committee
- Down River Citizens Committee, Detroit
- Downtown Club, Los Angeles
- East Bay Committee for Protection of Foreign Born
- East Bay Peace Committee, Oakland
- East Harlem Women for Peace
- East Los Angeles Defense Committee
- East Meadow and Westbury Rosenberg Committee
- East Side Committee for Protection of Foreign Born, Los Angeles
- Eisler Defense Fund
- Emergency Civil Liberties Committee
- Emergency Committee of the Arts and Professions to Secure Clemency for the Rosenbergs
- Emergency Conference to Aid the Spanish Republic
- Emergency Conference to Save Spanish Refugees
- Emergency Peace Mobilization
- Emergency Trade Union Conference to Aid Spanish Democracy
- Emory Collier Defense Committee
- Estonian Committee for Protection of Foreign Born
- Films for Democracy
- Finnish American Freedom Committee
- Finnish-American Mutual Aid Society
- Florida Press and Educational League
- Frances Vivian Defense Committee
- Frank Ibanez Defense Committee
- Frank Spector Defense Committee
- Freedom of the Press Committee Against Deportation
- Friends and Neighbors of David Hyun
- Friends of Chinese Democracy
- Friends of Diamond Kimm
- Friends of Soviet Russia
  - Friends of the Soviet Union
- Friends of the Abraham Lincoln Brigade
- Friends of the Campus
- Frontier Bookstore, Seattle
- Frontier Films
- Fund for Social Analysis
- George Washington Carver School, New York City
- Georgia Peace Council
- Gosman-Fabian Defense Committee
- Great Neck Rosenberg Committee
- Greater New York Committee for Employment
- Greater New York Emergency Conference on Inalienable Rights
- Greek-American Committee for Defense of Peter Harisiades
- Greek-American Committee for National Unity
- Greek-American Committee for Protection of Foreign Born, Detroit
- Greek-American Council
- Greek-American Defense Committee, Detroit
- Gus Polites Defense Committee
- Harbor Committee for Protection of Foreign Born, Los Angeles
- Harlem Youth Congress
- Harry Bridges Defense Committee
- Harry Bridges Victory Committee
- Hawaii Civil Liberties Committee
- Hellenic-American Brotherhood
- Hempstead Rosenberg Committee
- Henry Steinberg Defense Committee
- Hollywood Writers Mobilization for Defense
- Housewives Protest Committee, Pittsburgh
- Hungarian-American Committee for Protection of Foreign Born
- Hungarian-American Council for Democracy
- Hungarian-American Defense Committee
- Hungarian Brotherhood
- Ida Gottesman Defense Committee
- Illinois Chapter of the American Peace Crusade
- Illinois People's Conference for Legislative Action
- Independent Citizens Committee of the Arts, Sciences, and Professions
- Independent Progressive Party
- Independent Voters League, Pittsburgh
- Institute of Marxist Studies
- Institute of Pacific Relations
- Intercontinent News Service
- International Association of Democratic Lawyers
- International Book Store, Inc., San Francisco
- International Committee of Intellectuals in Defense of Peace
- International Juridicial Association
- International Labor Defense
- International Music Bureau
- Intourist
- Irving Peace Theater
- irwin Franklin Defense Committee
- Italian-American Committee for Protection of Foreign Born, Detroit
- Italian Anti-Fascist Committee
- James Keller Defense Committee
- Japanese American Committee for Democracy
- Jefferson School Bookshop
- Jefferson School of Social Science
- Jewish People's Committee
- Jewish People's Fraternal Order
- John Reed Clubs of the United States
- John Santo Defense Committee
- Joint Anti-Fascist Refugee Committee
- Joint Committee for Trade Union Rights
- Joint Defense Committee
- Joseph Weydemeyer School of Social Science, St. Louis
- King-Ramsey-Conner Defense Committee
- Korean-American Deportees Defense Committee
- Labor Research Association
- Labor Youth League
- Larry Davis Defense Committee
- Latvian Committee for Protection of Foreign Born
- Laurenti Defense Committee, Akron
- Lawyers Committee on American Relations with Spain
- Lawyers Committee to Keep the United States Out of War
- League for Mutual Aid

== See also ==
- List of members of the House Un-American Activities Committee
