= Attorney General's List of Subversive Organizations =

American 1947 list

The United States Attorney General's List of Subversive Organizations (AGLOSO) was a list drawn up on April 3, 1947 at the request of the United States Attorney General (and later Supreme Court justice) Tom C. Clark. The list was intended to be a compilation of organizations seen as "subversive" by the United States government. Among those were: Communist fronts, the Ku Klux Klan and the Nazi Party.

== History ==
=== Creation ===
The Attorney General's list was first known as the Biddle list after President Franklin D. Roosevelt's Attorney General Francis Biddle began tracking Soviet controlled subversive front organizations in 1941. The original list had only eleven organizations but was greatly expanded by the end of the decade to upwards of 90 organizations. It did not list individuals.

Communist groups, which emerged both in the pre-war and the post-war list, are marked by one ". In the meantime, even some trade unions that excluded members of openly communist groups from their membership lists were dissolved, partially also by government resolution.

Thousands of Americans with progressive or radical political beliefs signed petitions for, or became members of, these groups without being aware of the Communist ties of the group. Many were later persecuted and suffered personal consequences during the McCarthy era. Some others, though, were found through HUAC investigations and Venona cable intercepts, to be actively involved in Soviet sponsored espionage and related activities.

=== Biddle list ===
Biddle List of 5 February 1943
1. American League Against War and Fascism
2. American League for Peace and Democracy
3. American Patriots, Inc.
4. American Peace Mobilization
5. American Youth Congress
6. Communist Party USA
7. Congress of American Revolutionary Writers
8. League of American Writers
9. Michigan Federation for Constitutional Liberties
10. National Committee for the Defense of Political Prisoners
11. National Committee for Peoples Rights
12. National Federation for Constitutional Liberties
13. National Negro Congress
14. Protest War Veterans of the USA
15. Washington Book Shop Association
16. Washington Committee for Democratic Action
17. Workers Alliance

(Source: New York Times of 5 December 1947)

=== AGLOSO of 4 December 1947 ===
On December 4, 1947, US Attorney General Tom C. Clark released the "Attorney General's List of Subversive Organizations" (AGLOSO).

As reported by the New York Times on the same day, the list included groups from the Biddle List plus new groups plus eleven (11) school. Leaders of five groups—the Reverend William H. Melish of the National Council of American-Soviet Friendship, Martic Martntz of the Armenian Progressive League of America, Howard Selsam of the Jefferson School of Social Science, Max Yergan of the Council on African Affairs, and Edward Barsky of the Joint Anti-Fascist Refugee Committee—denied the government's accusation.

The next day, the New York Times reported a second batch of groups who rejected the government's accusation: William Z. Foster and Eugene Dennis of the Communist Party USA, an unnamed spokesperson for the International Workers Order, an unnamed spokesperson for the Civil Rights Congress, an unnamed spokesperson for American Youth for Democracy, Harrison L. Harley of the Samuel Adams School for Social Studies, and Walter Scott Neff of the Abraham Lincoln School.

AGLOSO of 4 December 1947
1. Abraham Lincoln School of Chicago, IL
2. American League Against War and Fascism
3. American League for Peace and Democracy
4. American Patriots, Inc.
5. American Peace Mobilization
6. American Polish Labor Council
7. American Youth Congress
8. American Youth for Democracy
9. Armenian Progressive League of America
10. Civil Rights Congress including: Civil Rights Congress for Texas, Veterans Against Discrimination of Civil Rights Congress of New York
11. The Columbians
12. Communist Party USA including Communist Political Association, Citizens Committee of the Upper West Side (New York City), Committee to Aid the Fighting South, Dennis Defense Committee, Labor Research Association, Southern Negro Youth Congress, United May Day Committee, United Negro and Allied Veteran of America
13. Connecticut State Youth Conference
14. Congress of American Revolutionary Writers
15. Council on African Affairs
16. George Washington Carver School of New York, NY
17. Hollywood Writers Mobilization for Defense
18. Hungarian-American Council for Democracy
19. International Workers Order
20. Jefferson School of Social Science of New York, NY
21. Joint Anti-Fascist Refugee Committee
22. Ku Klux Klan
23. League of American Writers
24. Macedonian-American People's League
25. Michigan Federation for Constitutional Liberties
1. National Committee for the Defense of Political Prisoners
2. National Committee to Win the Peace
3. National Council of American-Soviet Friendship
4. Nature Friends of America
5. National Federation for Constitutional Liberties
6. National Negro Congress
7. New Committee for Publications
8. Ohio School of Social Sciences
9. Philadelphia School on Social Sciences and Art
10. Photo League of America
11. Proletarian Party of America
12. Protest War Veterans of the USA
13. Revolutionary Workers League
14. Samuel Adams School for Social Studies of Boston, MA
15. School of Jewish Studies of New York, NY
16. Seattle Labor School
17. Socialist Workers Party including American Committee for European Workers Relief
18. Tom Paine School of Westchester, NY
19. Tom Paine School of Social Science of Philadelphia, PA
20. Walt Whitman School of Social Science of Newark, NJ
21. Veterans of the Abraham Lincoln Brigade
22. Washington Book Shop Association
23. Washington Committee for Democratic Action
24. Workers Alliance
25. Workers Party including Socialist Youth League

(Source: New York Times of 5 December 1947)

== Later history ==
The Attorney General's List of Subversive Organizations (AGLOSO) was expanded by President Harry S. Truman's Executive Order 9835. EO 9835 established the first Federal Employee Loyalty Program designed to root out Communist infiltration of the U.S. government. It allowed for organizations to be listed on the recommendation of certain members of the House Un-American Activities Committee (HUAC) members, as designated by committee Chairman J. Parnell Thomas. Those he named initially were John McDowell, a Pennsylvania Republican, Richard Vail, an Illinois Republican, and John Wood, a Georgia Democrat. They readied their first version of the list for Attorney General Tom C. Clark within a few days. It appeared in the Federal Register on March 20, 1948.

Executive Order 10450, issued by President Dwight D. Eisenhower in April 1953, expanded the Attorney General's List and added the proviso that members of the United States armed forces could not join or associate with any group on the list under threat of discharge from military service.

=== List as of 1959 ===
- Abraham Lincoln Brigade April 29, 1953
- Abraham Lincoln School for Social Science April 29, 1953
- Action Committee to Free Spain Now April 29, 1953
- Alabama People's Educational Association April 29, 1953
- American Association for Reconstruction in Yugoslavia April 29, 1953
- American Christian Nationalist Party April 29, 1953
- American Committee for European Worker's Relief April 29, 1953
- American Committee for Protection of Foreign Born April 29, 1953
- American Committee for the Settlement of Jews in Birobidzhan Inc September 28, 1953
- American Committee for Yugoslav Relief, Inc. April 29, 1953
- American Committee To Survey Labor Conditions in Europe July 15, 1953
- American Council for a Democratic Greece (formerly known as the Greek American Council; Greek American Committee for National Unity), April 29, 1953
- American Peace Crusade
- American Polish League
- American Women for Peace January 22, 1954
- American Youth Congress April 29, 1953
- American Youth for Democracy April 29, 1953
- Black Dragon Society
- Cervantes Fraternal Society
- Committee to Abolish Discrimination in Maryland
- Committee to Aid the Fighting South
- Committee to Defend the Rights and Freedom of Pittsburgh's Political Prisoners
- Committee for a Democratic Far Eastern Policy April 29, 1953
- Committee for Constitutional and Political Freedom
- Committee for the Defense of the Pittsburgh Six
- Committee for Nationalist Action
- Committee for the Negro in the Arts
- Committee for Peace and Brotherhood Festival in Philadelphia
- Committee for the Protection of the Bill of Rights
- Committee for World Youth Friendship and Cultural Exchange
- Committee to Defend Marie Richardson
- Committee to Uphold the Bill of Rights
- Congress of American Revolutionary Writers April 29, 1953
- Congress of American Women April 29, 1953
- Congress of African Women
- Dai Nippon Butoku Kai
- Daily Worker Press Club
- Detroit Youth Assembly
- Elsinore Progressive League
- Families of the Baltimore Smith Act Victims
- Federation of Greek Maritime Unions
- Florida Press and Education League
- Freedom Stage, Inc.
- Friends of the Soviet Union
- Garibaldi American Fraternal Society
- German American Bund
- Harlem Trade Union Council
- Hellenic-American Brotherhood
- Hungarian Brotherhood
- Independent Socialist League
- Industrial Workers of the World
- Japanese Association of America
- Jeannette Rankin Brigade
- Jewish Community of Cortlandt
- Jewish Culture Society
- Jewish People's Committee
- Johnsonites
- Knights of the White Camelia
- Ku Klux Klan
- Labor Youth League
- League of American Writers
- Mario Morgantini Circle
- Michigan Council for Peace
- Michigan School of Social Science
- Nanka Teikoku Gunyudan
- National Council of Americans of Croatian Descent April 29, 1953
- National Negro Congress January 22, 1954
- Nationalist Action League
- Nationalist Party of Puerto Rico July 15, 1953
- Nature Friends of America April 29, 1953
- Oklahoma League for Political Education
- Peace Information Center September 28, 1953
- Peace Movement of Ethiopia April 29, 1953
- People's Educational and Press Association of Texas
- People's Rights Party April 4, 1955
- Revolutionary Workers League
- Russian American Society
- Silver Shirt Legion of America
- Sakurakai April 29, 1953
- Veterans of the Abraham Lincoln Brigade
- Virginia League for People's Education
- Youth Communist League
- Yugoslav Seaman's Club, Inc. January 22, 1954

== Abolition ==
The list went through several revisions until President Richard M. Nixon abolished it in 1974.

== Impact ==
The list's impact was immediate but not all important. Its purpose was to provide a guide for the loyalty boards mandated by EO 9835. The Federal Bureau of Investigation (FBI) began using it immediately, but it was only one of many lists they used. The HUAC maintained its own list. Membership in an organization on any such list was reported to the Justice Department and loyalty boards.

The list was quickly adopted by other public and private groups, which used it to discriminate without any notice, charges, or hearing.

== See also ==
- English-language press of the Communist Party USA
- Non-English press of the Communist Party USA
- List of members of the House Un-American Activities Committee
