= Ruth A. M. Schmidt =

20th and 21st-century American geologist and paleontologist

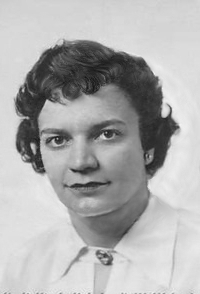
- Schmidt in 1952
- Born: April 22, 1916; Brooklyn, New York
- Died: March 29, 2014 (aged 97); Anchorage, Alaska
- Education: Columbia University; New York University
- Scientific career
- Fields: Geology; Paleontology
- Institutions: United States Geological Survey

Ruth Anna Marie Schmidt (April 22, 1916 – March 29, 2014) was an American geologist and paleontologist who was a pioneer for women scientists. She spent most of her career in Alaska, where she established a United States Geological Survey (USGS) field office and established the first Department of Geology at the Anchorage Community College, now part of the University of Alaska Anchorage. In 1964, Schmidt directed the initial assessment of the damage done to the city of Anchorage by the Great Alaska Earthquake, the largest earthquake in North American history, and the second largest earthquake ever to be recorded. She worked for the USGS in Washington, DC during the era of McCarthyism and was investigated twice for disloyalty because of her membership in the interracial Washington Cooperative Bookshop. She was cleared both times. She earned a number of awards, honors, and letters of commendation and appreciation. After her death in 2014, she was recognized as a philanthropist.

== Early life and education ==
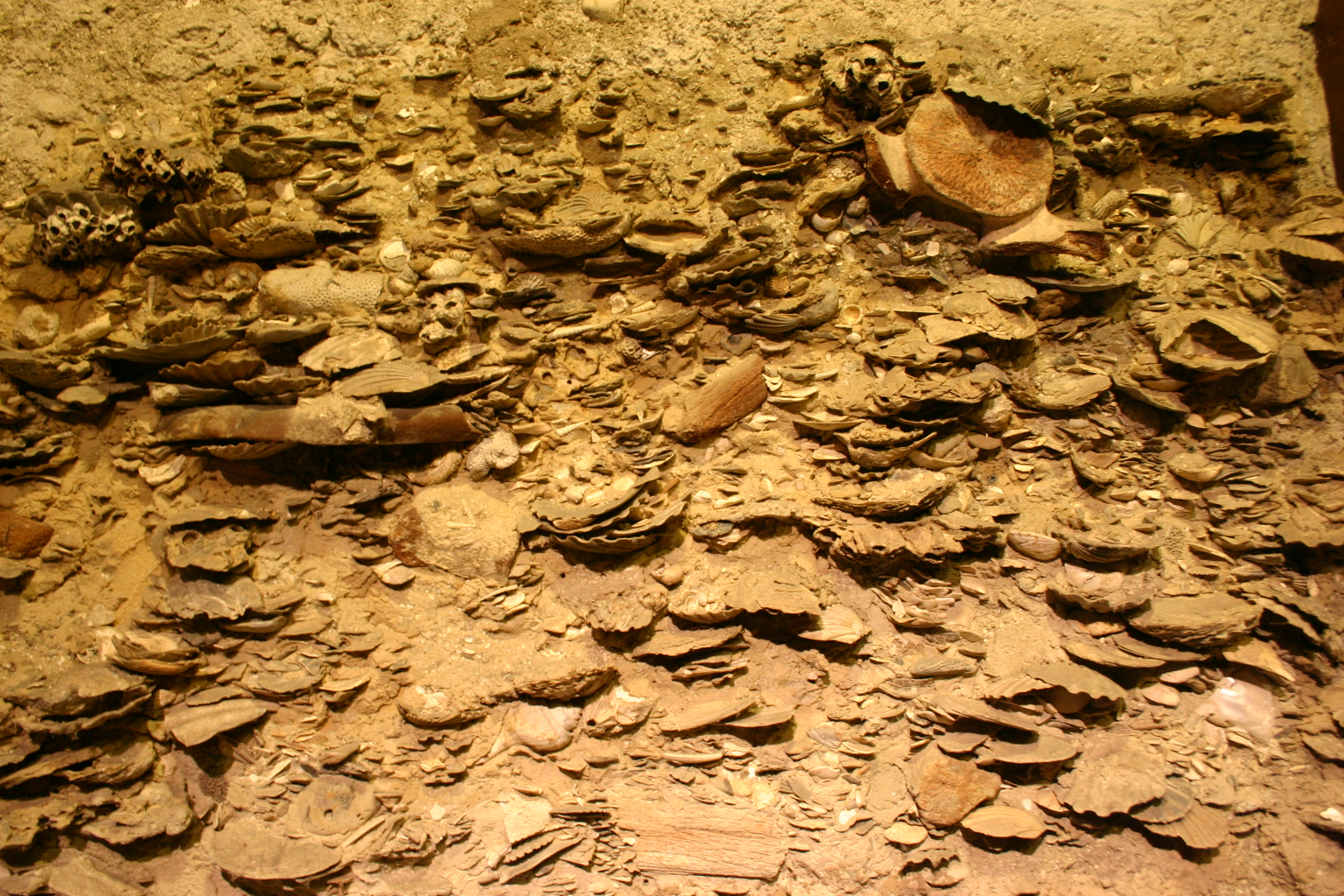
The Yorktown Formation, well known for its fossils, which Schmidt studied in graduate school at Columbia University.

Schmidt was born in Brooklyn, New York, in 1916. She graduated from Brooklyn's Erasmus Hall High School, and then attended the Washington Square College of New York University 1932–1936, during the height of the Great Depression. She earned high marks and graduated with an AB (artium baccalaureus) in geology in 1936. Her family encouraged the Schmidt siblings to obtain degrees in higher education, and all of her siblings, including three sisters and one brother, earned college degrees in the 1920s. While in college, she was inducted into Phi Omega Pi, earned the most valuable player award for hockey from the Washington Square College of New York University Alumnae Association, and was celebrated in the school newspaper as "crazy about fossils."

After college, she studied comparative anatomy, biology, and inorganic chemistry at the Hunter College of the City of New York, and trained in radiography with New York University Professor H. H. Sheldon. To earn money for graduate school, she worked as an x-ray technician at a private medical doctor's office and at Long Island Hospital. She also worked at the American Museum of Natural History, where she took x-rays of vertebrate and invertebrate specimens. Schmidt competed with 84 other candidates to win a $500 fellowship from New York City Panhellenic to conduct advanced study of the application of radiography to paleontology. She began her graduate studies in pure science at Columbia University in 1938, and finished her coursework in 1942. She was awarded her master's degree—the A.M. (Artium Magister)--in 1939. The title of her thesis was, "Miocene Ostracoda from Yorktown Formation." Beginning work on her dissertation in 1941, she completed her dissertation in 1948 and graduated with her doctorate degree in geology in 1948.

== Career ==
Schmidt was a pioneer for women in the sciences throughout her career. When WWII broke out, many male graduate students were drafted into military service. Because of the shortage of teaching and research assistants, Schmidt was recruited by Columbia University Professor A. K. Lobeck to serve as an assistant, the first female graduate student to teach all-male classes at Columbia. She taught science and military map-making.

Schmidt was also interested in civil rights for ethnic minorities, and when she lived in Washington, she joined the Washington Cooperative Bookshop because of its mission of racial inclusion. Her membership in this organization, which was branded as communist by U.S. Attorney General Tom C. Clark in 1947, led to two investigations against Schmidt by the Department of Interior. She was cleared both times.

Schmidt traveled widely throughout her career as a geologist. Her passports bear the stamps of two dozen countries, including Algeria, Antarctica, Argentina, Aruba, Australia, Czechoslovakia, Denmark, Ecuador, the Falkland Islands, Finland, Hong Kong, Iceland, Italy, Japan, Mexico, Netherlands, New Zealand, Switzerland, the United Kingdom, and the Union of Soviet Socialist Republics (USSR). She also traveled across the United States, and lived in several states as part of her work for the USGS. Schmidt traveled extensively throughout Alaska too, and crossed the Arctic Circle numerous times both in Alaska and elsewhere.

Seal of the United States Department of the Interior, where Schmidt worked as a member of the US Geological Survey for 20 years.

=== United States Geological Survey (USGS) ===
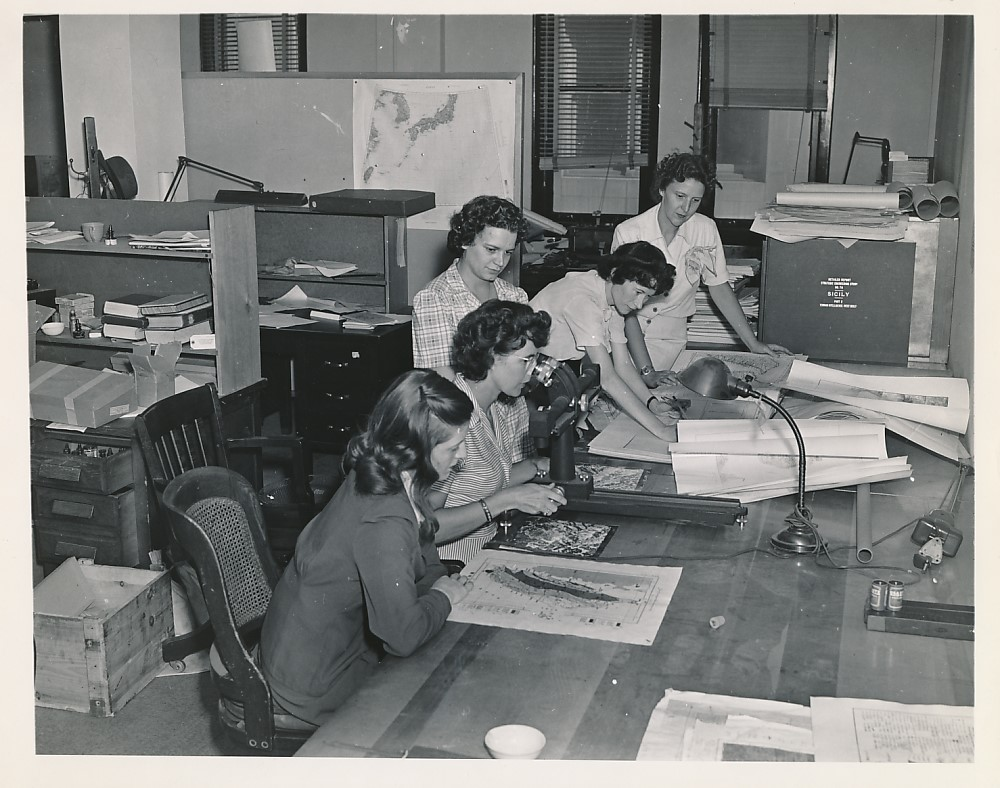
Women USGS geologists working with maps during WWII; Ruth A. M. Schmidt is in the center

Schmidt began working for the United States Geological Survey (USGS) in Washington, D.C., in early 1943, postponing the completion of her doctoral dissertation until 1948. She worked in various positions for the USGS until 1963. From 1946 through 1948, she conducted research on radiography, paleontology, and micro-paleontology for the Paleontology and Stratigraphy Branch of the USGS. Beginning in 1948, and continuing through 1950, Schmidt worked for the top secret Military Geology Unit of the USGS, preparing "engineering geology reports, (classified) for [the] Corps of Engineers on suitability of areas in European and Pacific Theaters for construction and alignment of roads, airfields, and location of construction materials." She was one of the few women geologists to be hired to do this work, which was classified and required a security clearance. In 1949, Schmidt received routine clearance under the new loyalty investigation program that had been instituted by President Harry Truman through Executive Order 9835.

From 1950 to 1952, Schmidt worked for the Geological Division of the USGS, organizing the Lexicon Project (map names) in Washington, and the Paleotectonic Map Project in Denver, CO. From 1952 until her departure for Alaska in 1956, she worked for the Mineral Classification Board, cataloging minerals for all US federal lands. In 1956, Schmidt transferred to Alaska to establish a field office for the U.S. Geological Survey in Anchorage, where she was the division geologist until 1963. She was "in charge of all technical and administrative matters pertaining to classification of federal lands [regarding] oil, gas, coal, and other locatable minerals."

Letters in the Ruth A. M. Schmidt papers collection indicate that by 1961, Schmidt had become unhappy doing office work for the USGS, and she asked for a transfer to the USGS Oceanography Division or the Geological Division so that she could conduct geological research. Her request to transfer to the Geological Division was declined by Don Eberlein, with the reason given that "the big push is for hearty new male PhD's with training and experience in regional geologic mapping and potential such that they may be expected to qualify as project chiefs in a reasonably short period of time." In this letter, Eberlein suggests that Schmidt "learn to live with the job emotionally" and to work on research in her "spare time."

In 1963, after twenty years of service, Schmidt resigned from the USGS so she would not have to leave Alaska where she had purchased a home in the city of Anchorage and a small plot of wetlands outside of town upon which she had built a cabin. She had also become involved in the local and Alaska community, having co-founded the Alaska Geological Society in 1957–58 and serving as its first president.

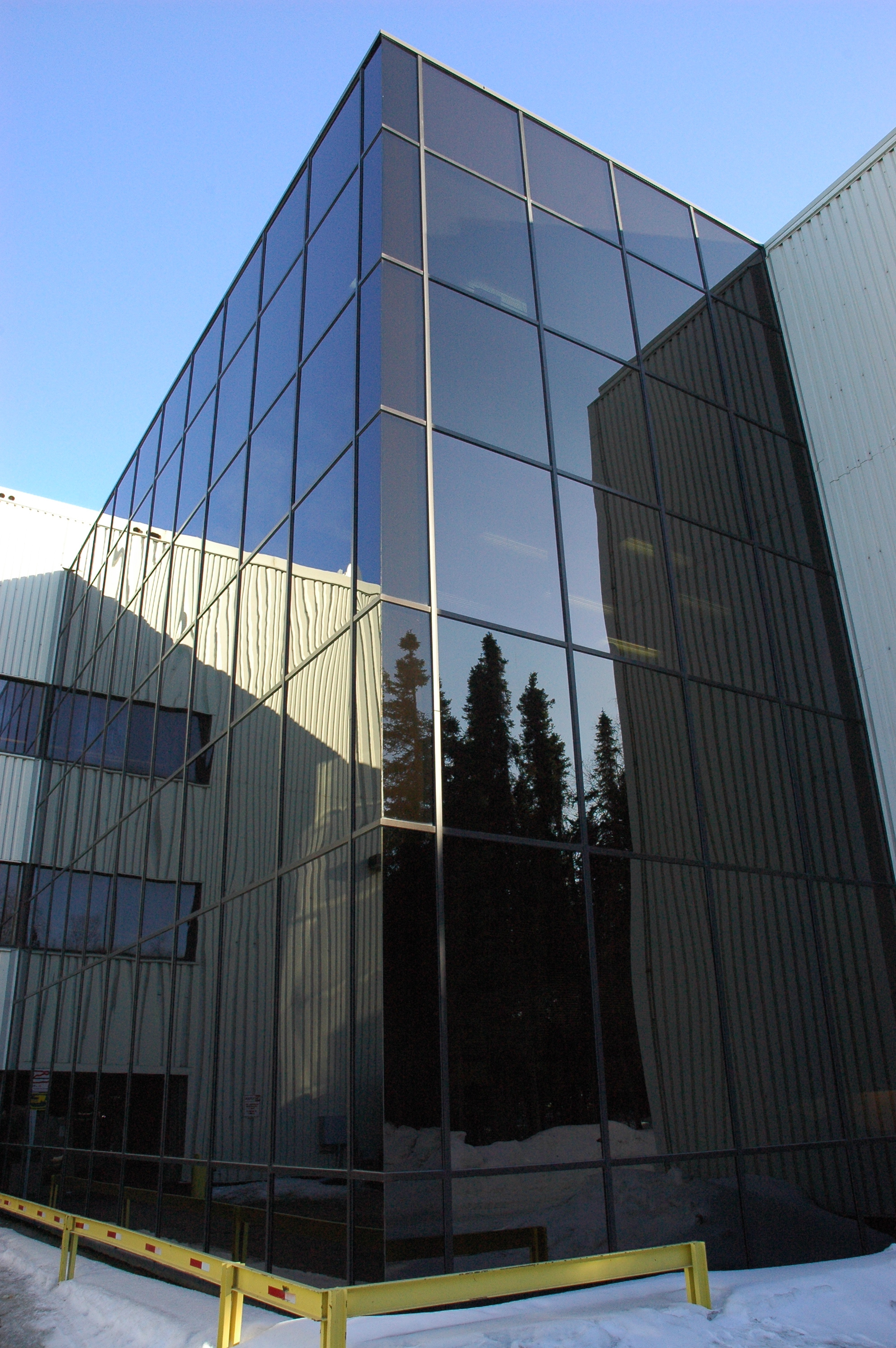
The UAA/APU Consortium Library on the campus of the University of Alaska Anchorage now houses the Ruth A. M. Schmidt papers collection.

=== University of Alaska Anchorage ===
Schmidt began teaching classes as a part time lecturer and adjunct in 1959 at the Anchorage Community College, which was incorporated into the University of Alaska Anchorage (UAA) in 1962. She was the first geology professor at the university, and for a time, she was the only geologist. Women geologists were very rare at the time of Schmidt's appointment to the position, and Schmidt is credited for being a pioneer for women scientists. She founded the Department of Geology served as its first chair, and in 1970, designed and oversaw the construction of the geology laboratory. She was recognized as a distinguished lecturer, and then was promoted to associate professor in 1970. In this position, she taught geology, environmental education, landscapes and resources of Alaska, geomorphology, and paleontology, in addition to doing other work expected of a professor including student advising and curriculum development. She worked for UAA for 25 years until her retirement from teaching in 1984.

In 1964, she and four others were in the middle of the frozen-over Portage Lake boring holes in the ice to gather sampling data when the Great Alaska earthquake struck. After a harrowing experience finding a way off the ice, which had buckled while the water underneath was churning, she was chosen to lead the Engineering and Geological Evaluation Group, a group of 50 scientists, to assess the areas of damage in Anchorage prior to the start of rebuilding.

=== The Great Alaska Earthquake ===
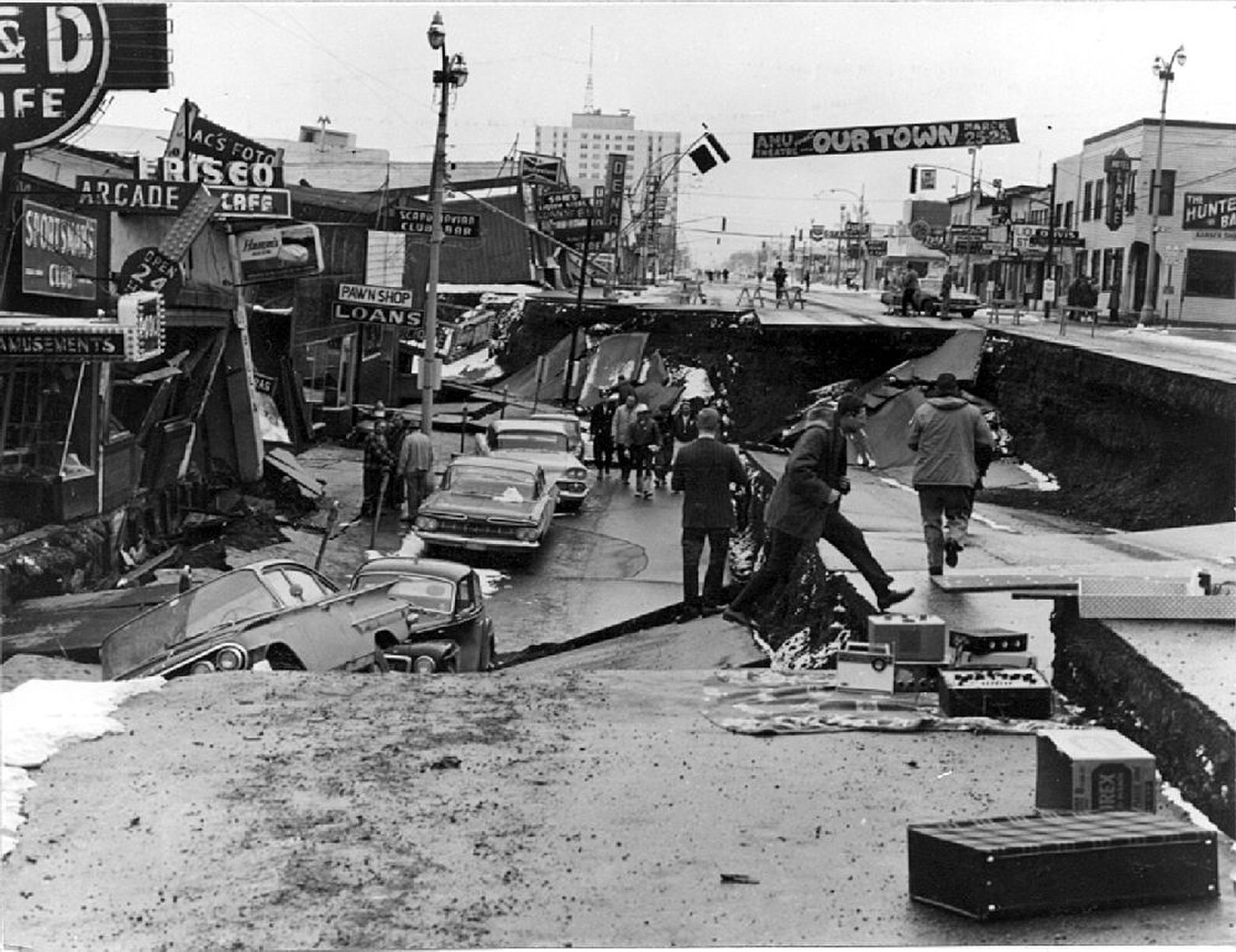
Fourth Avenue, a street in Anchorage, showing the damage caused by the Great Alaska Earthquake, 1964. Photo by the U.S. Geological Survey.

The Great Alaska Earthquake was the most powerful earthquake recorded in North America, and the second most powerful to be recorded in history. Hitting Alaska about 5:30 pm on March 27, 1964, the earthquake registered 9.2. The damage was immense. The tsunami that followed devastated coastal communities from Alaska to northern California. Landslides demolished entire neighborhoods, railroads and highways were destroyed, and major utilities such as gas mains, electrical grids, and phone systems were obliterated. The USGS estimates that 143 people were killed, and thousands were more displaced. Property damages amounted to $2.3B in 2013 dollars.

On the day of the earthquake, Schmidt was leading a research team of three University of Alaska Anchorage students and a U.S. Forest Service scientist on Portage Lake, a glacial lake bounded by the Portage Glacier near Anchorage, Alaska. The crew had driven an Arctic Cat snowmobile onto the frozen lake and were drilling holes in the three feet of ice to measure the depth of the water and to study sedimentation processes. They had just finished drilling a borehole near the center of the lake when the earthquake struck. Heather Saucier, a journalist who studied Schmidt's scientific career and who interviewed Mike Mitchell, one of the students on the Portage Lake, reports that Schmidt and the others fought to keep their balance as the water under the ice sloshed back and forth, rocking the ice. The movement of the ice was later measured at five feet. Booming sounds immediately followed the earthquake, which lasted for nearly five minutes, and the team witnesses avalanches on the mountains surrounding the lake. The flying snow reduced visibility to 10 feet. Led by Schmidt, the group attempted to head for the nearest shore on their snowmachine, but fissures in the ice, open water, and the continued rocking prevented them from reaching shore. Eventually, they abandoned the snowmachine and began to walk in a different direction to get off the ice, tied together by a rope in case one of them slipped into a fissure in the ice. Once they made their way to shore, they discovered a cabin occupied by an Alaska Railroad worker's family and were able to contact authorities by radio. The next day, a helicopter rescued them from the cabin and Schmidt and others began the work to assess the impact of the earthquake.

Video illustrating the effects of the Great Alaska Earthquake. Video by the U.S. Geological Society in commemoration of the 50th anniversary of the earthquake.

Saucier and Denison state that Schmidt was appointed to serve as the federal coordinator for the Engineering and Geological Evaluation Group, and led a team of 50 scientists to assess the damage and to make recommendations for the future rebuilding of the city of Anchorage. However, a letter from then Governor William A. Egan thanking Schmidt for her "dedication and foresightedness" indicates that the federal government was not initially involved. On a job application dated 1974, Schmidt indicates that she was the coordinator and the geologist in charge of the project, and that the position ended because the "federal government took over." Additionally, the "Guide to the Anchorage Engineering Geology Evaluation Group papers", written by Megan K. Friedel, states that the group of scientists was sponsored by the Alaska State Housing Authority and the City of Anchorage, not the federal government. Friedel also notes that the scientists included geologists, soil scientists, federal and state engineers, and scientists from private companies.

There was significant conflict between Schmidt and the Anchorage Engineering and Geological Evaluation Group that she led and downtown business leaders and real estate developers. Business leaders and developers published angry letters in the Anchorage Times, a local pro-business newspaper. While Schmidt and the other scientists wanted to carefully study the damage and to identify future risks, developers and other business leaders wanted to charge ahead with the rebuilding process. The scientific group led by Schmidt was able to complete its study and published its final report on May 8, 1964, roughly a month after the earthquake occurred.

Schmidt donated the documents related to the report in 1981 to the UAA/APU Archives and Special Collections at the University of Alaska Anchorage.

=== Consultancy work ===
On January 1, 1964, Schmidt launched a geological consulting service from her home located at 1040 C Street in Anchorage, AK. Her business license lists the name as R A M Schmidt, PhD. On a job application dated 1974, she notes that she worked as a "consulting geologist [to] prepare reports on wells from [the] North Slope, Gulf of Alaska, other areas; engineering geology reports, building sites, [and] road construction for clients." It was in this capacity that she led the Anchorage Engineering and Geological Evaluation Group to study the effects of the Great Alaska Earthquake. In May 1964, Governor William A. Egan wrote Schmidt a letter to thank her for her "dedication and foresightedness" on this project.

In 1974–1975, she was an environmental consultant to the Governor of Alaska on the construction of the Trans-Alaska Pipeline System (TAPS). For this work, she traveled up and down the TAPS to inspect environmental impacts, restoration work, and the condition of the work camps. Governor Jay Hammond awarded her a State of Alaska Commendation "for serving the interest of the people of the State of Alaska as a member of the Pipeline Coordinators Office during construction of the Trans Alaska Oil Pipeline," on June 13, 1977.

== Loyalty hearings ==
=== Washington Cooperative Bookshop ===
During the McCarthy era, Schmidt was investigated twice for possible disloyalty to the US government. At issue was her involvement with the Washington Cooperative Bookshop, a retail store in Washington, DC, that sold books, records, magazines, and art. Persons who joined the cooperative as members received a discount on purchases. The Bookshop advocated for racial equality between African Americans (then called Negroes) and whites during a time when Washington was largely racially segregated, and sold books on African American topics, records featuring black musicians, and sponsored lectures, social activities, and concerts for interracial audiences.

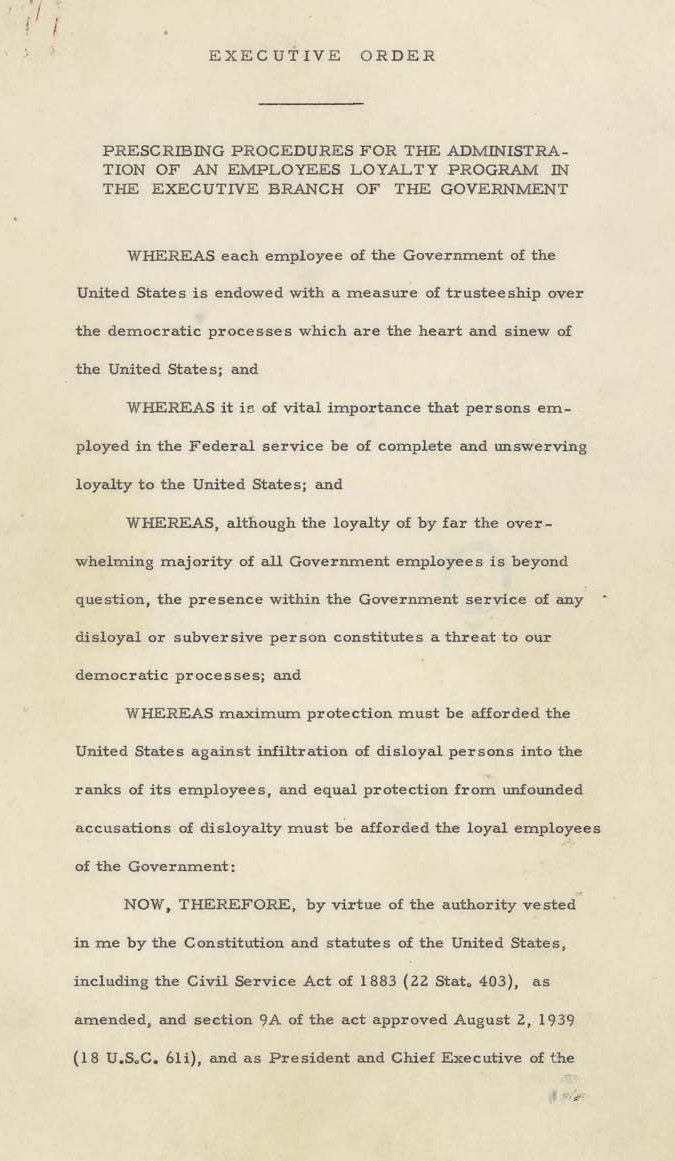
First page of Executive Order 9835, signed by President Harry S. Truman on March 21, 1947

On December 5, 1947, the Washington Post published a list of organizations that Attorney General Tom C. Clark had branded as subversive and/or communistic. The list came to be known as the Attorney General's List of Subversive Organizations, or AGLOSO. This was the first time the list was made public, although parts of the original list, compiled in 1943, had previously been leaked. The list was based on secret information, and the organizations listed were not given opportunities to see the evidence that led to their listing, nor were they able to refute the allegations. The list was created after President Harry S. Truman issued Executive Order 9835 that established a loyalty review process to ensure that no one who was disloyal to the US government would be federally employed. The Washington Cooperative Bookshop was included on the 1947 list that was published in the Washington Post; the Bookshop was categorized as Communistic. The reasons given for the listing included sale of communist literature and the fact that the Bookshop hosted speakers thought to be communist or subversive. Of particular concern in Schmidt's case was the sale of the magazines The New Masses; literature associated with the American Youth Congress; pamphlets and other material published by the American Peace Mobilization, and Schmidt's attendance and participation in lectures such as that by Edwin C. Randall about the political implications of atomic energy.

Schmidt said this about why she became a member:

I became a member of the Washington Cooperative Bookshop in August 1945 ... Since my arrival in Washington during the war (I came in early 1943) I had been disturbed by the segregation of negroes, and the unequal treatment they received in the capital of our country. I felt that such a situation was bad for this country, particularly when we were waging a war for equal rights, and against discrimination. In 1945, towards the end of this war, I happened to read Richard Wright's BLACK BOY—and this incensed me to the point of wanting to do something besides talk about it. I had heard of the Bookshop, probably from a folder I may have picked up in the store, as I frequently browsed in the bookstores along 17th street on the way to the Virginia buses on K Street. As I have always approved of cooperatives ... I decided to join this cooperative bookshop that claimed to be interracial.

=== 1950 hearing ===
In 1947, while she was working for the USGS, Schmidt completed a routine loyalty review under Executive Order 9835, and received notification that she was cleared in 1949. In 1950, the issue of her membership in the Washington Cooperative Bookshop again came to the attention of the Department of Interior Loyalty Board, triggered, Schmidt thought, because she had applied to work for the Atomic Energy Commission. She was officially charged with disloyalty to the US government in a letter dated August 15, 1950. By that time, the Bookshop had closed due to financial pressures caused by the continual harassment by the federal government, but as Schmidt wrote to a friend, "those who were members still have to answer individually the charges against the organization." Schmidt hired an attorney, David Cobb, to represent her. Upon Cobb's suggestion, Schmidt wrote to former professors, graduate school colleagues, friends, and co-workers to request that they submit a notarized affidavit testifying to her integrity, her loyalty to the US government, and her views about communism. There are carbon copies of 17 such letters of request among Schmidt's papers in the UAA/APU Archives and Special Collections. The letter from her dissertation adviser and professor of geology at Columbia University states: "She has always been devoted to her science, geology, and as far as I have been aware not been interested in anything else." Her request for a hearing was accepted, and a three hour hearing occurred on October 25, 1950, chaired by Mastin G. White, a solicitor for the Department of Interior. There were four members of the Loyalty Board present; five witnesses spoke on Schmidt's behalf. At the hearing, Schmidt acknowledged that she had "been a member of and sympathetically associated with the Washington Bookshop Association." Asked what other organizations she belonged to, Schmidt responded:

I have a list—the Washington Association of Scientists, Geological Society of Washington, Paleontological Society of Washington, Society of Economic Paleontologists and Mineralogists (SEPM), American Registry of X-Ray Technicians, Red Cross, Community Chest, Blue Cross, and Sigma Xi.

On January 15, 1951, E. L. Compton, Secretary of Interior Department, sent Schmidt a letter that cleared her, stating that "no reasonable ground exists for believing that you are disloyal to the Government of the United States."

=== 1954 hearing ===
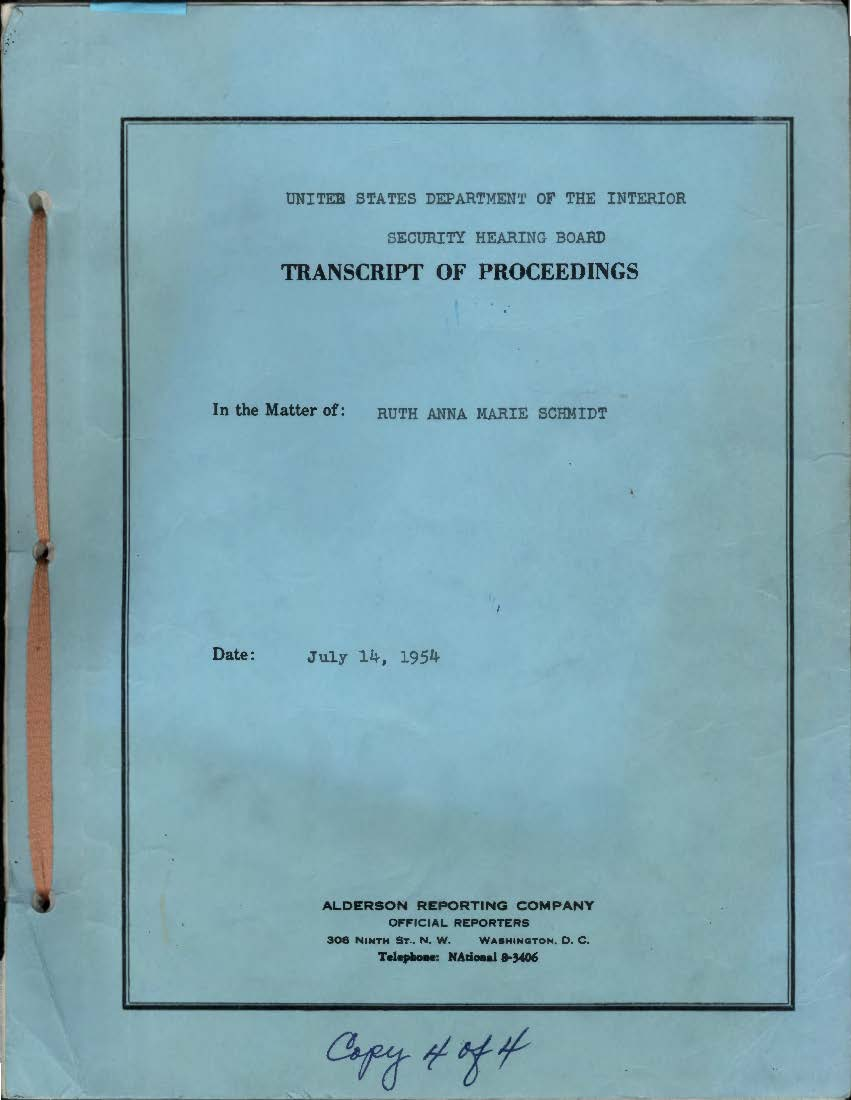
Cover page of the 1954 transcript of the US Department of the Interior Security Hearing Board against Ruth A. M. Schmidt

In 1954, Schmidt received another letter from the Department of Interior advising her that she was again being investigated, this time under the authority of Executive Order 10450. The letter, dated April 7, 1954, and signed by the Secretary of the Department of the Interior, Douglas McKay, directed her to respond to charges of membership in a "totalitarian organization" that she knew had been listed as Communistic, and being sympathetically associated with a list of 21 persons, nine of them suspected of being Communists. Schmidt again hired David Cobb to be her attorney. In her written response to the charges, dated April 30, 1954, she re-submitted much of the same testimony about the Washington Bookshop that she had submitted in 1950. She explained her relationships to the 21 people, saying that she knew some of them as passing acquaintances, while some were social friends. Some of the people she said she did not recall or had only partial recollection of them.

The Department of Interior Secretary Douglas McKay answered her letter on June 28, 1954: "A review of your answers to charges and supporting documents discloses that your denials and explanations do not constitute sufficient grounds to reinstate you. As a consequence, your request for a hearing on the charges will be granted." The hearing was scheduled for July 14, 1954.

Schmidt was again cleared of the charges.

== Honors and awards ==
Ruth Schmidt received many certificates, honors, awards, commendations, and letters thanking her for her service, her loyalty to professional organizations, and her notable achievements. These include:

- Alaska Audubon: certificate in recognition of outstanding dedication to conservation and 12 years of service as Program Chair of Anchorage Audubon Society, May 21, 1998; President's Award, January 18, 1996
- Alaska Center for the Environment: in honor of her work towards the foundation of Alaskan conservation, October 5, 1985
- Alaska State Parks Volunteer Service Award, June 4, 1985
- American Association for the Advancement of Science (AAAS): elected to be a Fellow, May 31, 1968
- American Association of Petroleum Geologists: certificate honoring 45 years membership, May 2002; same for 40 years in 1997; same for 25 years 1982
- American Civil Liberties Union (ACLU), Anchorage Chapter: Special Certificate of Recognition, October 28, 1994
- American Institute of Professional Geologists (AIPG): certificate to recognize 40 years of service received in 2003; Silber Anniversary Certificate recognizing Schmidt as a Charter member and Emeritus member September 30, 1988
- Arctic Institute of North America: elected Fellow, September 23, 1985; life member certificate January 28, 1991
- Common Cause: certificate of appreciation and letter from founding chair John W. Gardner, October 13, 1995
- Department of the Interior, United States Geological Survey Service Award: in recognition of 20 years of service in the Government of the United States, December 31, 1963
- Geological Society of America (GSA): elected to be a Fellow, November 16, 1963
- Geological Society of America (GSA): 50-year Fellow, October 9, 1996
- International Geological Congress: Certificate of Appreciation for Outstanding Contributions, July 19, 1989, along with letter from Secretary-General Bruce B. Hanshaw
- President Bill Clinton: letter of thanks for participating in at the Table roundtable discussions on women's issues, July 5, 1996
- Public Citizen: certificate of Recognition for Contributing Member (n.d.)
- Society for Sedimentary Geology (SEPM): certificate of "Recognition and Appreciation for your Loyalty to SEPM for 60 years of membership", July 22, 2002; certificate honoring the same for 65 years, July 23, 2007
- State of Alaska Commendation "for serving the interest of the people of the State of Alaska as a member of the Pipeline Coordinators Office during construction of the Trans Alaska Oil Pipeline," signed by Governor Jay Hammond, June 13, 1977
- The Living Room Floor Map and Debating Society "informs all Persons that between 1969 and 1972 Ruth Schmidt was a charter member of a group of Alaska Conservation Valiants who diligently pursued and developed the initial major themes for ANCSA [Alaska Native Claims Settlement Act] Sec. 17d2 land withdrawals and the subsequent Presidential Proclamations for Alaska National Monuments and National Wildlife Refuges," December 1, 1978
- Who's Who of American Women, 22nd edition 2000/2001 Millennium Edition
- Who's Who in Frontier Science and Technology, First Edition, 1984/85

== Death and legacy ==
Schmidt retired from teaching in 1984 after 25 years and continued consulting as a geologist until 2000. She suffered from dementia in her later life, and died at the age of 97 on March 29, 2014. Her obituary notes that a celebration of life was held.

While living and also after her death, Schmidt was a philanthropist. In her will, she donated significant funds to 22 charities, most of them located in Alaska. She created the Schmidt Charitable Trust, originally named in honor of her parents, Edward and Anna Range Schmidt, that provides financial assistance for Alaskan students of any age who study earth sciences; special preference is given for Alaska Native students and other ethnic minorities. She donated regularly to the American Civil Liberties Union, the Anchorage chapter of the Audubon Society, and to Anchorage area cultural organizations, social service organizations, and to conservation groups. She also contributed to Common Cause, a national non-partisan pro-democracy group and to Public Citizen. In 1998, she made an anonymous donation of $10,000 to the Alaska Museum of Natural History. After her death, Trustees for Alaska, a non-profit organization that works to foster the well-being of Alaska's natural environment, was happily surprised that Schmidt had left a bequest to their organization.

In 1960, Schmidt had purchased 4.8 acres of wetland in what was then an outlying area of the city of Anchorage. She paid $2000 for the land. By 2012, when Schmidt donated the land to the Great Land Trust, who in turn donated it to the Municipality of Anchorage Parks and Recreation Department, the land was valued at nearly $300,000.

Schmidt was a pioneer for women in the sciences, and acted as an enthusiastic mentor, role model, and colleague for women students. She is credited with laying "the foundation of the geoscience curriculum" at the University of Alaska Anchorage. Schmidt was posthumously inducted into the Alaska Women's Hall of Fame in 2015.

== External resources ==
- Who was Ruth Schmidt? UAA/APU Archives—Omeka
- Ruth A. M. Schmidt curriculum vitae (resume) UAA/APU Archives—Omeka
- Photographs of Ruth A. M. Schmidt UAA/APU Archives—Omeka
- Objects Schmidt used in her work as a geologist UAA/APU Archives—Omeka
- Ruth Schmidt obituary. Legacy.com
- 1964 Alaska Earthquake damage photos. USGS.
- The 1964 Great Alaska Earthquake and Tsunamis—A Modern Perspective and Enduring Legacies
- Prelude to McCarthyism: The Making of a Blacklist, Prologue Magazine, National Archives
- Executive Order 9835, Executive Orders Harry S. Truman, Harry S. Truman Presidential Library & Museum
- Executive Order 10450, Federal Register of the National Archives
