= Hollywood Anti-Nazi League =

Anti-fascist Communist front group

The Hollywood Anti-Nazi League (later known as the American Peace Mobilization) was founded in Los Angeles in 1936 by Soviet agent Otto Katz and others with the stated purpose of organizing members of the American film industry to oppose fascism and Nazism. It was run by the American popular front, and it attracted broad support in Hollywood from both members and nonmembers of the Communist Party USA (CPUSA). It ceased all anti-Nazi activities immediately upon the signing of the Molotov–Ribbentrop Pact in August 1939.

== Foundation ==
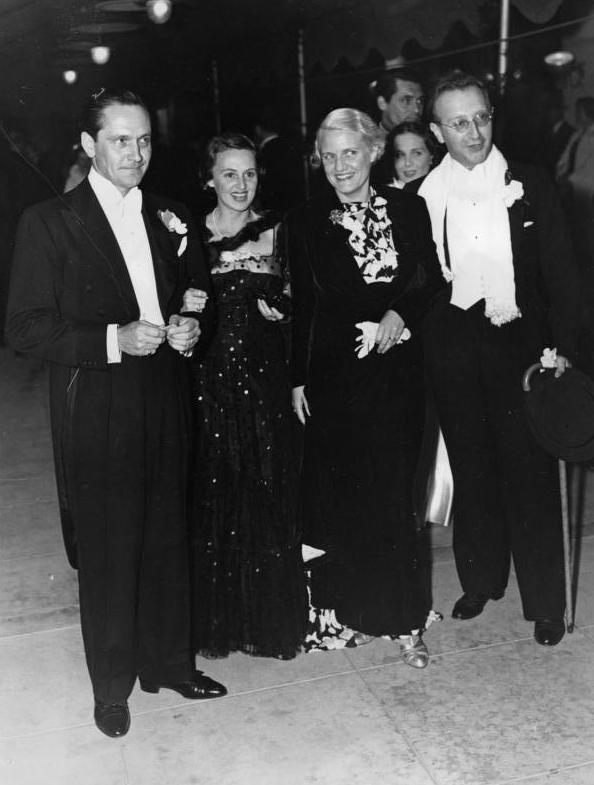
Fredric March and his wife Florence with Helga and Hubertus zu Löwenstein (far right), cofounder of the Hollywood Anti-Nazi League, July 1936

In 1936, the CPUSA allegedly ordered Otto Katz to raise funds and to found the Hollywood Anti-Nazi League (HANL). To kick off his work, Katz held a hundred-dollar-a-plate fundraising dinner, which was attended by, among others, Irving Thalberg, Jack L. Warner, David O. Selznick, and Samuel Goldwyn. John Joseph Cantwell, Archbishop of Los Angeles, was on hand to bless the proceedings. Actress and artist Gloria Stuart was also involved in the League's founding. Katz formed the HANL under the auspices of the "mother of all front groups", the American League for Peace and Democracy.

Katz and his cofounder, Hubertus zu Löwenstein, held an organizational meeting at the Wilshire Ebell Theatre in Los Angeles. At the meeting, screenwriter Donald Ogden Stewart and author Dorothy Parker, fellow members of the Algonquin Round Table, were named respectively chairman and honorary chairman by acclamation.

The HANL was the first American anti-Nazi organization that was not overtly linked to American Jews, and served "as the focal point of the [film] industry's anti-Nazism" from 1936 through 1939. There was, in fact, friction between the League and other organized Jewish groups in Los Angeles. For instance, The Community Relations Committee, a group which served as a "political instrument of wealthy Los Angeles Jews", seemed, according to screenwriter and League activist Hy Kraft, to use most of the energy it spent interacting with the League trying to convince them to change their name to the "Hollywood Anti-Nazi Anti-Communist League".

== Leadership and membership ==
Although the HANL was a communist front organization, its membership spanned the entire political spectrum. Stewart, Herbert Biberman, Robert Rossen, Francis Edward Faragoh, and Ring Lardner, Jr. were party members. The HANL had both liberal (e.g. Philip Dunne and Jo Swerling) and conservative (e.g. Herman J. Mankiewicz and Rupert Hughes) members who were not in the CPUSA. The League claimed a membership of 5000, although Leo Rosten thought that this figure was exaggerated.

By 1937, the board of directors of the HANL included Jack Warner and Carl Laemmle, as well as the head of the Hollywood division of the CPUSA, John Howard Lawson. The famous members of the League, whose names appeared on its letterhead and in its publications, didn't have much to do with the actual operations, though, which were left in the hands of lesser-known CPUSA members.

== Activities ==
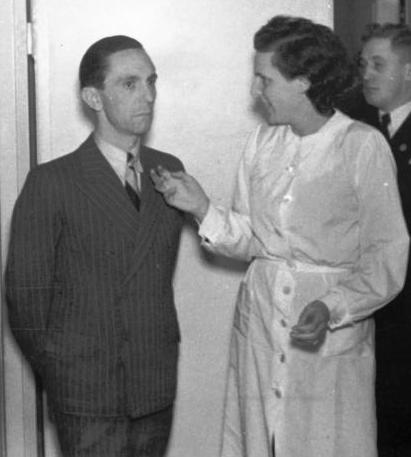
Leni Riefenstahl (with Joseph Goebbels) in 1937, around the time that her visit to Los Angeles was boycotted by the Hollywood Anti-Nazi League

An anti-Nazi league has established itself in Hollywood which was termed by Vittorio Mussolini returning home from his research trip a "center of political agitation against the Fascist Idea."
According to recent reports, for the time being they want to support needy émigrés before launching an all-out attack, increasing the film agitation against Germany.
After all they have worked on a film in which Charlie Chaplin caricatures the Führer and hence wanted to ridicule him.

— From film journal Film-Kurier, January 30, 1939

The League inaugurated its founding with a huge party at the Shrine Auditorium in Los Angeles in October 1936. In attendance were Irving Berlin, and Gale Sondergaard. Los Angeles mayor Frank Shaw gave a speech, as did Eddie Cantor who, perhaps having had let his passion get the better of him, claimed that Nazi agents had tried to prevent his attendance. Dorothy Parker spoke as well.

The HANL published a weekly newspaper, the Hollywood Anti-Nazi News, beginning in October 1936 and another journal, Hollywood Now. By 1937, the League was running two radio programs on Los Angeles station KFWB, mostly scripted by Donald Stewart and Herbert Biberman. It had local sections in Silver Lake, Hollywood, Beverly Hills, and other neighborhoods around Los Angeles County.

Among these other activities, the League sponsored a variety of dinners, lectures, and rallies. The HANL also organized boycotts of German products and picketed meetings of the Los Angeles chapter of the German American Bund.

Today–Benito Mussolini confers with Hitler in Berlin, Vittorio Mussolini arrives in Hollywood. He asked for–and received–the privilege of being the first fascist aviator to bomb helpless Ethiopians.
Any one has the right to be in America, but we submit that his presence here is not an occasion for celebration or social fetes. Those who welcome him are opening their arms to a friend of Hitler and an enemy of democracy.

— HANL advertisement announcing Vittorio Mussolini's arrival in Los Angeles, September 1937

The HANL also publicized visits of prominent fascists to Los Angeles in order to shame their hosts, including Vittorio Mussolini, son of the Italian dictator Benito Mussolini. Mussolini was visiting Los Angeles in order to study film-making. The morning of his arrival, September 25, 1937, the HANL ran ads in Hollywood trade papers but did not hold protests at the airport. Mussolini stayed with producer Hal Roach during his time in Hollywood.

The League also protested Nazi filmmaker Leni Riefenstahl's visit to Hollywood in November 1938. The HANL again took out ads in Hollywood trade papers calling on the industry to "close its doors to all Nazi agents". The admonition was somewhat successful, and Riefenstahl issued a statement about the advertisement saying that she was surprised that the League had attacked her personally and that she was not an agent of the Nazi government. Riefenstahl, interviewed in France after her three-month trip to America, said that she had "received everywhere lustrous reception except Hollywood where she was only received by Walt Disney, but was otherwise boycotted at the instigation of the Anti Nazi League".

The League also attempted to convince the studios to produce an anti-Nazi film, but they were hindered in their efforts because the Motion Picture Production Code decreed that movies should be apolitical. They also accused the studios of changing the ending of The Road Back, a film by James Whale based on a novel of the same name by Erich Maria Remarque, in order to "'glorify' Hitler".

== Investigations ==
The HANL was one of the first groups targeted by HUAC when it was taken over by Conservative Democratic Congressman Martin Dies, who said that the group was "under the control of the communists". In summer 1940, Los Angeles County District Attorney Buron Fitts convened a grand jury to investigate "a Communist objective to overthrow the government and assassinate leading industrialists who refuse to 'play ball.'" A former CPUSA organizer testified to the grand jury that the party had set up the HANL in order to raise funds from wealthy members of the film industry. He testified that "because of Hitler's anti-Semitic program, the Communist party conceived the idea of playing on the fears of the Jewish people and getting them into the Communist party by selling them on the idea that the party, being an international organization, was the only agency in position to effectually combat the influence of Hitlerism and afford protection to the Jews".

== End of League ==
After the Molotov–Ribbentrop Pact was signed in August 1939, guaranteeing neutrality between Nazi Germany and the Soviet Union, communist-backed organizations were no longer allowed by the Comintern to oppose Nazism. The HANL changed its name, first to the "Hollywood League for Democratic Action" and finally, in concert with a number of other formerly anti-Nazi front groups, to the American Peace Mobilization.
