= Stockholm Appeal =

1950 initiative to promote nuclear disarmament

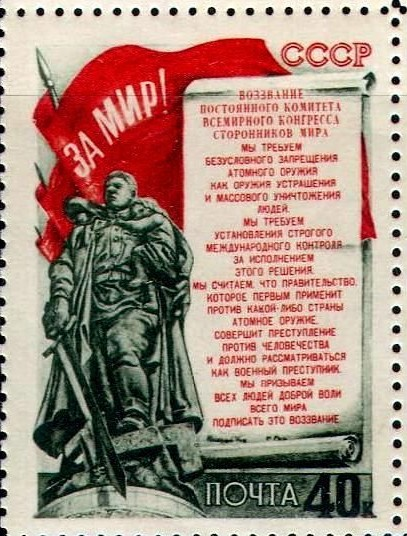
1951 Soviet stamp with the full text of the appeal with the Soviet War Memorial in Berlin's Treptower Park.

The Stockholm Appeal was an initiative launched by the World Peace Council on 19 March 1950 to promote nuclear disarmament and prevent atomic war.

== Background ==
On 15 March 1950, the World Peace Council approved the Stockholm Appeal, calling for an absolute ban on nuclear weapons. The appeal was initiated by the French physicist, communist and 1935 Nobel laureate in Chemistry Frédéric Joliot-Curie. About two weeks after the start of the Korean War, the initiative's first publication called Peacegram claimed that the appeal has already earned 1.5 million signatories. The total gathered petitions were allegedly signed by 273,470,566 persons (including the entire adult population of the Soviet Union). The appeal was also signed by many prominent public figures, artists, and intellectuals. The text of the appeal read:

We demand the outlawing of atomic weapons as instruments of intimidation and mass murder of peoples. We demand strict international control to enforce this measure.

We believe that any government which first uses atomic weapons against any other country whatsoever will be committing a crime against humanity and should be dealt with as a war criminal.

We call on all men and women of good will throughout the world to sign this appeal.

== Anti-Communist responses ==
The United States dismissed the Stockholm Appeal, with the U.S. Secretary of State Dean Acheson branding it as "a propaganda trick in the spurious 'peace offensive' of the Soviet Union." Liberals in the United States, led by W.E.B. Du Bois established the Peace Information Center (PIC) to publicize the Stockholm Appeal, but the U.S. Justice Department alleged that the PIC was acting as an agent of the Soviet Union, and thus required the PIC to register with the federal government. Du Bois and other PIC leaders refused, and they were indicted for failure to register.

Anti-communists in France responded to the Stockholm Appeal (French: L'Appel de Stockholm) by setting up the Paix et Liberté group to counter the Communist propaganda with their own: one of their first posters was La Pelle de Stockholm ("The Spade of Stockholm") digging the graves of the countries in Eastern Europe that had been subjugated by the Soviets.

== Notable signatories ==
- Jorge Amado, Brazilian writer and member of the Brazilian Academy of Letters
- Herbert Aptheker, American historian and political activist
- Louis Aragon, French poet
- Pierre Benoit, French novelist and member of the Académie française
- Leonard Bernstein, American composer and conductor
- Rudolf Carnap, German philosopher and advocate of logical positivism
- Marcel Carné, French film director
- Marc Chagall, Russian-French artist
- Maurice Chevalier, French actor and cabaret singer
- Jacques Chirac, French politician and later President of France (1995–2007)
- Frank Marshall Davis, American journalist, poet and activist
- W. E. B. Du Bois, American sociologist, historian and activist
- James Gareth Endicott, Canadian clergyman and Christian missionary
- Ilya Ehrenburg, Soviet-Jewish writer, journalist and historian
- Lion Feuchtwanger, German-Jewish novelist and playwright
- Vincent Glinsky, American sculptor
- Dashiell Hammett, American novelist and screenwriter
- Leo Hurwitz, American documentary filmmaker
- Frédéric Joliot-Curie, French physicist, 1935 Nobel Prize in Chemistry laureate and President of the World Peace Council (1950–1958)
- Irène Joliot-Curie, French chemist, 1935 Nobel Prize in Chemistry laureate
- Lionel Jospin, French politician and later Prime Minister of France (1997–2002)
- Alfred E. Kahn, American journalist, publisher, and head of the Jewish People's Fraternal Order
- Rockwell Kent, American painter and graphic artist
- Robert Lamoureux, French actor, screenwriter and film director
- Artur Lundkvist, Swedish author, critic and member of the Swedish Academy
- Thomas Mann, German writer, essayist and 1929 Nobel Prize in Literature laureate
- Moa Martinson, Swedish author of proletarian literature
- Henri Matisse, French painter and sculptor
- Yves Montand, Italian-French actor and singer
- Pablo Neruda, Chilean poet, diplomat and 1971 Nobel Prize in Literature laureate
- Noël-Noël, French actor and screenwriter
- Erwin Panofsky, German-Jewish art historian
- Charlie Parker, American jazz saxophonist and composer
- Gérard Philipe, French stage and film actor
- Pablo Picasso, Spanish painter, sculptor and poet
- Jacques Prévert, French poet and screenwriter
- Eberhard Rebling, German musician
- Pierre Renoir, French stage and film actor
- Muriel Rukeyser, American-Jewish poet and activist
- Armand Salacrou, French dramatist
- George Bernard Shaw, Irish playwright, critic and activist
- Dmitri Shostakovich, Soviet composer and pianist
- Simone Signoret, French film actress
- Michel Simon, Swiss stage and film actor
- Henri Wallon, French psychologist, philosopher and politician
- Harry F. Ward, English-American Methodist minister and Christian socialist
- Maria Wine, Swedish-Danish poet
- Urho Kekkonen, Finnish Prime Minister
- Vittorio Emanuele Orlando, former Italian Prime Minister
- Lázaro Cárdenas, former President of Mexico
