= Armin K. Lobeck =

American cartographer and geomorphologist

Armin Kohl Lobeck (August 16, 1886 - April 26, 1958) was an American cartographer, geomorphologist and landscape artist.

== Biography ==
Lobeck was born in New York City on August 16, 1886, but his family moved to Haworth, New Jersey, three years later.

Lobeck was 21 years old when he entered Columbia University in 1907 because he dropped out of high school to care for his family when his father became ill. In his senior year at Columbia, he took master's level courses in botany and architecture, and received his AB degree in 1911 and his master's degree in 1913. After working as a teacher at the Philadelphia College of Pharmacy from 1911-1914, he returned to Columbia University where he was awarded his Ph.D. in 1917.

At the beginning of World War I, he enlisted in the US Army and was sent to Fort Dix, NJ, but he was soon transferred to the United States Department of State. He was assigned to The Inquiry, an organization under Colonel E. M. House to prepare for making peace at the end of the war. While there, he received a reasonable salary of $183.00 a month. At the war's end, he was assigned to the Geography Section of the American Commission to Negotiate Peace. His duty was to prepare physiographic maps of problem areas, such as the Balkans, the Istria, Albania, and other regions.

Lobeck accepted a position as associate professor at the University of Wisconsin–Madison, and worked there for 10 years from 1919-1929. His first physiographic map of importance was published as the large-scale "Physiographic Diagram of the United States", published by the Nystrom Company in 1921. In 1929 he returned to Columbia University as a full professor of geology, where he remained until his retirement in 1954.

During World War II, Lobeck was employed by the Military Intelligence Service (United States), G-2, on the General Staff of the United States Army, and the Army Map Service. There he prepared sketch maps for the invasion of North Africa. He also prepared a series of European maps in sections for the use of the staff, that were combined after the war into a large physiographic map of Europe.

Lobeck died in Englewood, New Jersey at the age of 71 on April 26, 1958.

== Accomplishments ==
Lobeck was awarded the Neil Miner Medal by the National Association of Geoscience Teachers in 1956.

Lobeck and his wife were active in the affairs at Martha's Vineyard, Massachusetts. He became a director of the Camp Meeting Association in 1950, and later he was elected vice president of the association in 1956. Upon his recommendations, one of his graduate students, Ruth A. M. Schmidt, went on to become a pioneer for women in the sciences.

== Biographical materials ==
- Grandinetti, Fred. The Life and Thought of Armin K. Lobeck. Thesis (M.A.)--Southern Connecticut State College, 1973.
- Lobeck, A. K. [Armin K. Lobeck, Biographical Materials]. Kremers Reference Files. 1913. Ebling Library, University of Wisconsin, Madison, WI.
- Lobeck's papers are held in at least three archives. Columbia University holds papers relating to his journey to Paris with the Inquiry, the National Archives contain his correspondence, maps, and papers relating to the inquiry and the American Commission to Negotiate Peace (the official name of the Inquiry in Paris), while the American Geographical Library in Milwaukee contains papers about his career more generally, including some correspondence while at sea on the way to Paris.
- Smith, Guy-Harold. 1959. "Armin Kohl Lobeck, Geomorphologist and Landscape Artist, 1886-1958." Annals of the Association of American Geographers. Volume 49, Issue 1, pages 83–87, March 1959.
- "Men of the Inquiry: Armin Lobeck."

== Bibliography ==
- Lobeck, A. K., and Guy Harold Smith. Physiographic Diagram of South America. New York: Geographical Press, Columbia University, 1963. Relief shown by land form drawings. Does not have geographic names. Text on map verso and sheet 2. Description: 1 map; 57 x 41 cm. + 1 text sheet.
- Lobeck, A. K. Things Maps Don't Tell Us: An Adventure into Map Interpretation. New York: MacMillan Company, 1957.
- Lobeck, A. K. Physiographic Diagram of the United States. Maplewood, N.J.: Geographical Press, 1957.
- Lobeck, A.K., and A.K. Lobeck. Geological Maps of Georgia and the United States. 1957. Abstract: Collection includes 1968 geologic and 1969 mineral resource maps of Georgia; Georgia: A view from space (1976), as well as a 1957 physiographic and a 1958 geologic map of the United States, both by A.K. Lobeck.
- Lobeck, A. K. Brief History of Martha's Vineyard-Camp Meeting Association. Oak Bluff, Mass: The Association, 1956. 8 pages.
- Lobeck, A. K. Panorama of Physiographic Types. New York: Geographical Press, Columbia University, 1953. Intended for use in exercises relating to landforms in geography, geology, cartography, etc. including specific exercises on elevations, profiles and geological sections, streams and water bodies, human geography, and geology. Text contains names of land form types correlated with their location on the physiographic diagrams. Features numbered in the physiographic diagrams are assigned representative names (derived from famous physical scientists) and recreated in the form of a topographic map. Description: 2 maps and 2 diagrams on 1 sheet : both sides; 29 x 58 cm. and 29 x 56 cm., sheet 49 x 61 cm., folded to 49 x 31 cm. + text ([4] p.; 49 x 61 cm.).
- Lobeck, A. K. Physiographic Diagram of Australia. New York: Geographical Press, Columbia University, 1951. Relief shown pictorially, by spot heights, and by land form drawings. " ... to accompany text description and geological sections which were prepared by Joseph Gentilli and R.W. Fairbridge of the University of Western Australia." Includes list of physiographic regions, continuation inset of Tasmania, and 3 cross sections.
- Lobeck, A. K. Illustrations to Accompany Physiographic Diagram of Australia. New York: The Geographical Press, 1952. Notes: Includes 30 illustrations arranged by groups illustrating physiographic types as depicted on the physiographic map of Australia. Illustrations are designed to be used by the student to understand the Australian topography.
- Lobeck, A. K. Panoramic View of the New York Region As Seen from the Palisades.: With a Geological Section and Descriptive Text. Maplewood, N.J.: Geographical Press (formerly of Columbia University), a division of C.S. Hammond & Co, 1952.
- Lobeck, A. K. Physiographic Diagram of Pennsylvania [I.E. Portions of Pennsylvania, New Jersey, and New York]. New York: Geographical Press, Columbia University, 1951.
- Lobeck, A. K. Physiographic Diagram of North America. New York: Geographical Press, 1948. Notes: Accompanied by explanatory text by A.K. Lobek. Relief shown by land forms. Shows geological sections across Canada, United States and Mexico; 2 insets; text; on verso: Physiographic provinces of North America.
- Lobeck, A. K. Geological Diorama of the United States. New York: Columbia University, 1948. Notes: This diorama, "as it is reproduced here, consists of two parts. When pasted together they form a strip 96 inches long. The Diorama represents a Geological Cross-Section from New York to San Francisco, together with a birds-eye view of the country to the north. The distant horizon is slightly curved to give the illusion of looking at the actual surface of the earth with its spherical form."
- Lobeck, A. K. Physiographic Diagram of North America; Physiographic Provinces of North America. New York: Geographical Press, Columbia University, 1948.
- Lobeck, A. K. Elementary Exercises in Topographic and Structural Geology. New York: Geographical Press, Columbia University, 1947.
- Lobeck, A. K. Historical Geology of the United States. New York: Geographical Press, Columbia Univ, 1947.
- Lobeck, A. K. Physiographic Diagram of Africa. New York: Columbia University, Geographical Press, 1946.
- Lobeck, A. K. Physiographic Diagram of Asia The Physiographic Provinces of Asia. New York: The Geographical Press, 1945.
- Lobeck, A. K. State of Texas: From Physiographic Diagram of the United States. Maplewood, N.J.: Geographic Press, 1945.
- Lobeck, Armin K., Wentworth J. Tellington, and John K. Wright. Military Maps and Air Photographs: Their Use and Interpretation. New York: McGraw-Hill Book Company, Inc, 1944.
- Lobeck, A. K. Topographic Maps Showing Representative Examples: Constructional Forms : Destructional Forms. New York: Geographical Press, Columbia University, 1943.
- United States, and A. K. Lobeck. Southeastern Europe: Strategic Map of Climatic Types. Washington, D.C.: Army Map Service, U.S. Army, 1943.
- Lobeck, A. K. Geologic Map of Europe. New York: Geographical Press, Columbia University, 1942.
- Lobeck, A. K., Kurt E. Lowe, and Joseph H. Hyland. Geologic Map of the United States. [Maplewood, N.J.]: Geographical Press, Columbia University, 1941.
