= Allen Zoll =

American fascist leader

Allen Alderson Zoll (October 21, 1895 – August 30, 1969) was a far-right American political activist.

In the 1930s, Zoll founded the American Patriots, Inc., a group listed as a fascist group on the Attorney General's List of Subversive Organizations during the Second World War. The group had a publication, American Patriot, and hosted speakers such as Joe McWilliams, an American Nazi sympathiser, and Elizabeth Dilling, author of The Red Network. The Military Intelligence Corps refused Zoll training at his Citizens' Military Training Camp during the war. While he was working with American Patriots, Zoll was indicted for trying to extort money from Radio Station WMCA; he was not prosecuted following a not guilty plea.

In 1939, Zoll lobbied against the confirmation of U.S. Supreme Court Justice Felix Frankfurter since he was a foreign-born Jew.

Zoll later founded the anti-communist National Council for American Education in 1949 and later founded the American Intelligence Agency, the Federation of Conservatives, the Committee on Pan-American Policy, and the Order of George Washington. Research by Group Research, Inc., which analyzed records of right-wing organizations, said that 17 leaders in Zoll's organizations were also officers in or endorsers of the John Birch Society. He also formed an alliance with Willis Carto and his Liberty Lobby.

The Anti-Defamation League, who called Zoll a "notorious anti-Semite", said that in 1952 he was an adviser to Russell Maguire of The American Mercury and that he worked with Gerald L. K. Smith for a political committee, leading a group of 250 demonstrators at the 1952 Republican National Convention. In the mid-1950s, Zoll claimed that the United Nations was "a device to permit the colored races to rule the white races [and that] UNESCO is an alien conspiracy to teach sex delinquency to American schoolchildren."

He was on the staff of Billy James Hargis before becoming a worker in the 1964 presidential campaign of Barry Goldwater, where he was kept in touch with Texas oil tycoon H. L. Hunt.
