= Camp Arcadia =

- Walther League Camp – Camp Arcadia
- U.S. National Register of Historic Places
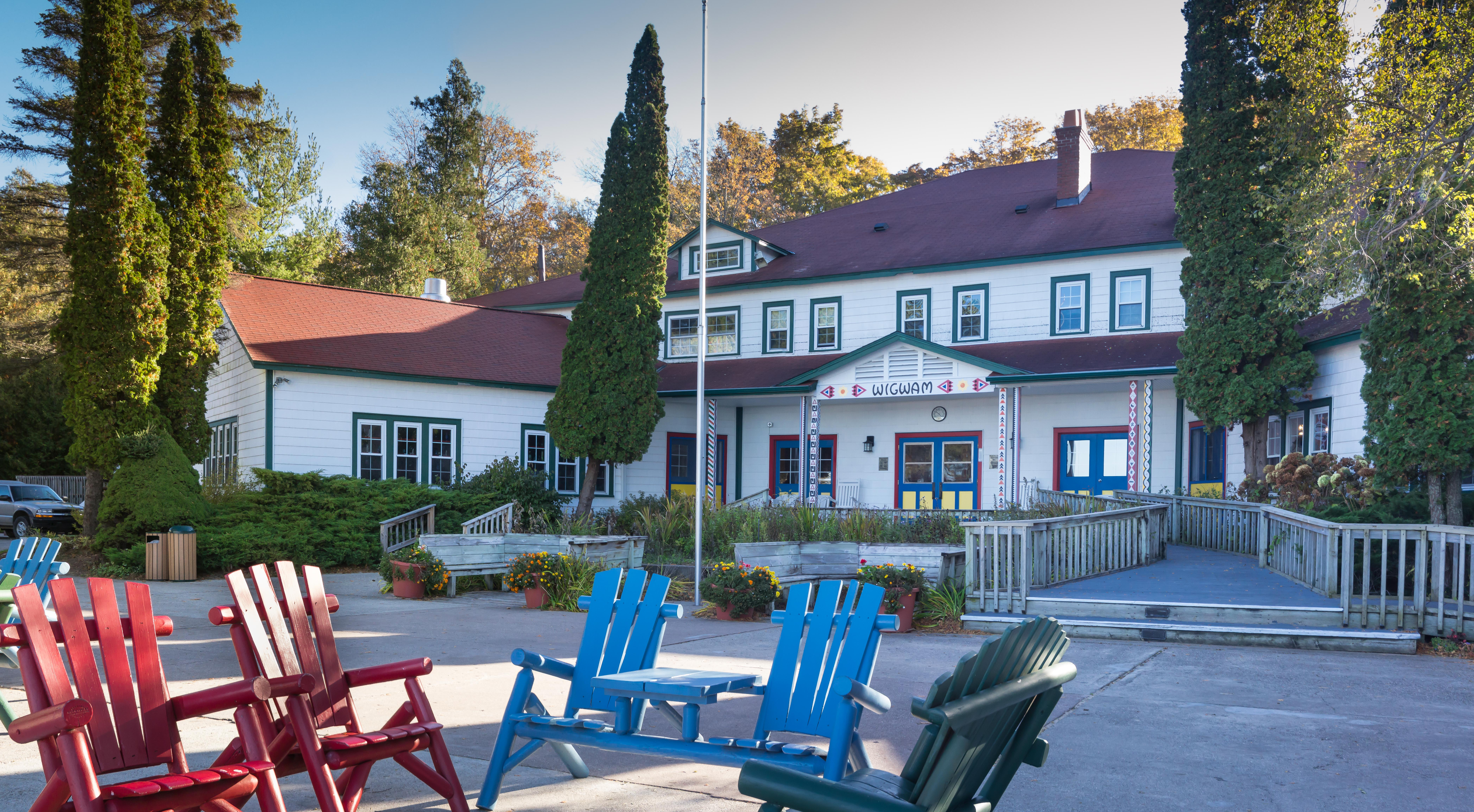
- The Wigwam in 2018

- Location within Michigan Location within the United States
- Interactive map
- Location: 3046 Oak Street, Arcadia Township, Manistee County, Michigan
- Coordinates: 44°29′45″N 86°14′27″W
- NRHP reference No.: 100000884
- Added to NRHP: April 17, 2017

Camp Arcadia is a Lutheran camp, owned and operated by the Lutheran Camp Association. Located on the shores of Lake Michigan in the small town of Arcadia, Michigan, Camp Arcadia has been in continuous operation since its opening in 1922.

== Geography ==
Camp Arcadia is located in Arcadia Township in Manistee County, Michigan. The main access road is M-22.

== History ==
Camp Arcadia opened in 1922 under the direction of the Walther League, the young adult group of the Lutheran Church–Missouri Synod. From its opening until his death in 1963, William "Chief" Wieherman ran the camp along with his wife Hildegard, affectionately known as "Mom". When the Walther League ceased operations in 1968. the future of the camp was uncertain, until a group of dedicated campers formed the Lutheran Camp Association and bought all 110 acres (0.45 km^{2}) of the camp. The LCA, a non-profit corporation, has operated the camp ever since. The camp was entered onto the National Register of Historic Places in 2017.

== Today ==
Camp Arcadia continues to run under the direction of the LCA. The current president is Ali Franke. Each summer, 39 college-age adults live and work at the camp. These employees cook, clean, and run the programs for the campers.

The camp opens on Memorial Day weekend. During this event, campers are invited to stay for free, provided they help in getting the property ready for the summer. After a week to train the summer staff, the camp begins its summer retreats, most of which are family weeks. After Labor Day weekend, the camp generally runs retreats through October, when it is then closed for winter.

== Gallery ==
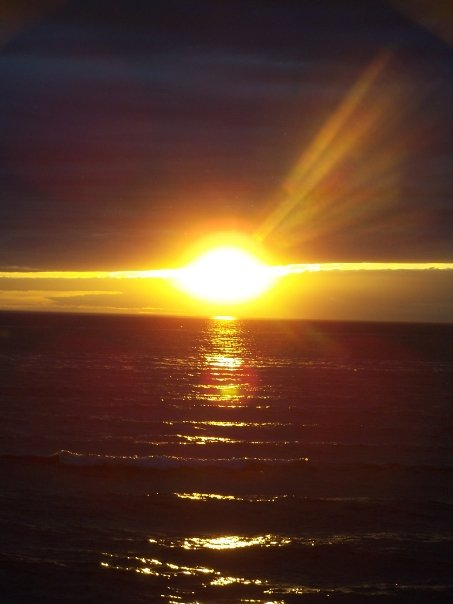
A sunset over Lake Michigan from Camp Arcadia

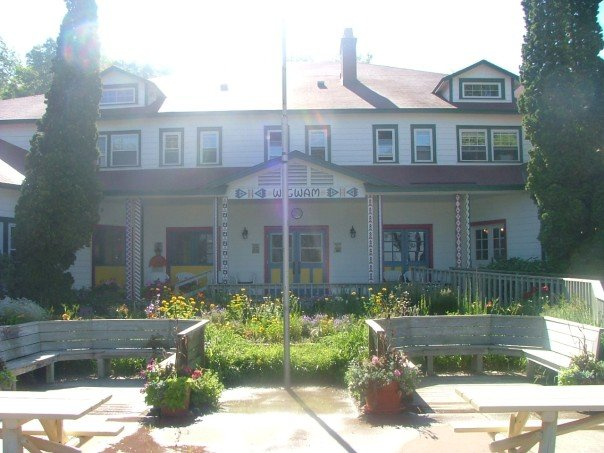
The Wigwam at Camp Arcadia, Michigan, facing east.
