= Guide to Subversive Organizations and Publications =

Guide to Subversive Organizations and Publications was a report published by the House Un-American Activities Committee (HCUA) during the Cold War. Originally published as a handbook in December 1948, it was revised and expanded in 1951, 1957, and 1961. The report listed organizations and publications cited as Communist fronts or "outright Communist enterprises" by federal, state, and municipal government agencies. In its original edition, 563 organizations and 190 publications were declared as subversive. Both private sector blacklisters and the FBI relied on the guide.

== Revisions ==
The 1951 edition contained a preface with a brief history and definition of Communist fronts and a guide to detecting them. The final edition in 1961 expanded this preface into a two-part introduction with sections titled. The first section, "What is a Communist front?" contained the text of the 1951 preface, an added excerpt about the value of front organizations to the Communist Party and the operating techniques of a front from J. Edgar Hoover's book Masters of Deceit as well, and a summary of legislation relating to front organizations. The new second section, "Scope of the Guide", provided an outline of the contents of the guide and a summary of the Soviet Union's united front strategy for cooperation with non-Communist countries.

The 1961 edition also separated the lists of organizations and publications into two sections each, one containing those designated as subversive by federal authorities and one containing those listed as subversive by state and municipal authorities.

== Views on the civil rights movement ==
In its introduction, the 1961 edition stated that Communist fronts gained support from non-communists by exploiting non-communists' interests in world peace and civil rights. The nationwide organization Civil Rights Congress and several state and municipal civil rights organizations were listed in the guide as Communist fronts.

== Relationship with the FBI ==
Even before its official publication in 1948, the FBI, and specifically senior FBI agent Lee Pennington, helped promote the report. FBI director J. Edgar Hoover furnished each field office with two or more copies and referred citizens to the guide so that they could identify fronts and "not be fooled into giving them... support."

== See also ==
- J. Edgar Hoover
- McCarthyism
- Hollywood blacklist
