= American Peace Crusade =

Communist front group

American Peace Crusade (APC) was an American peace advocacy organization. Established during the Korean War, the federal government identified the organization as a Communist front. Pitirim Sorokin, a Russian American sociologist and professor at Harvard University, was a sponsor of this organization. The Guide to Subversive Organizations and Publications published by the House Un-American Activities Committee (HUAC) characterized APC as a group formed by the Communists to function "as a new instrument for their 'peace' offensive in the United States."

American Peace Crusade is characterized as "Communist-led peace group", and a "pro-Soviet peace initiative". Historian Marian Mollin notes that the APC believed the United States to be the "greatest threat to world peace". According to historian Lawrence S. Wittner, the APC was the last Communist-headed peace organization in the United States.

== History ==
The APC was established in 1951 following the dissolution of the Peace Information Center. The founding committee included W.E.B. Du Bois, chemist Linus Pauling, and physicist Philip Morrison. Especially because of the provocative comments made by General of the Army Douglas MacArthur, American Peace Crusade feared that the Korean War would culminate in nuclear holocaust. The organization supported the withdrawal of US troops from the Korean Peninsula, talks with the People's Republic of China (PRC), and the removal of Douglas MacArthur, which the group believed would help ending the war.

APC published a pamphlet titled "Let the People Speak for Peace" and asked for what is described by James Smallwood in his book Reform, Red Scare, and Ruin as a "peace pilgrimage". The purpose of this "peace pilgrimage" was advocacy for putting a stop to the Korean War. Civil rights activist and lobbyist Virginia Foster Durr was mentioned by the APC as a founding co-sponsor of "Let the People Speak for Peace" booklet and the "peace pilgrimage". The activities of the APC received widespread coverage in newspapers across the United States. On February 21, 1951, the Denver Post in a headline entitled "Wife of General Counsel of Farmers' Union Insurance Corporation Signs Red Petition" claimed the APC was controlled by Communists.

The Subversive Activities Control Board (SACB) attempted to disband the American Peace Crusade. The Federal Bureau of Investigation (FBI) placed its agent inside APC and kept the organization under watch. The APC received an order from the SACB in August 1955 to officially register the organization as a front organization of the Communists. American Peace Crusade was disestablished in 1956, but local affiliates such as the Southern California Peace Crusade continued to operate for some time thereafter.

== See also ==
- Soviet influence on the peace movement
