= American Committee for Spanish Freedom =

Communist front group

The American Committee for Spanish Freedom was identified as a Communist front organization by the California Senate Factfinding Subcommittee on Un-American Activities in 1948. The organization opposed the Nationalist faction, and supported the Abraham Lincoln Brigades and others fighting for the Republican faction. Allen Chase was secretary and a 1936 candidate for Congress in New York on the Communist Party ticket. Other leaders included Stephen H. Fritchman of First Unitarian Church of Los Angeles, Bartley Crum, Representative John M. Coffee, Dalton Trumbo and Albert Maltz.

National offices were located at 55 West Forty-Second Street, New York City and by 1945 headquarters were listed as 5245 De Longpre Avenue, Los Angeles.
