= National Committee for the Defense of Political Prisoners =

American organization founded in 1931

The National Committee for the Defense of Political Prisoners (NCDPP) was an organization founded in June 1931 as an accompaniment to the International Labor Defense, led by the Communist Party of the United States of America. The NCDPP was originally called the Emergency Committee for Southern Political Prisoners (ECSPP).

The Committee aimed to "aid workers [to] organize and defend themselves against terror and suppression", and was described as an "'invading body' whose mission is to enter the Kentucky coal-fields, 'inform the American public of what is going on' and 'persuade officials ... to a more equitable course of action'."

The organization was influential in defending civil liberties, such as the Scottsboro Boys in Alabama, where nine African American teenagers were wrongly accused of raping a white woman, even in the face of medical evidence to the contrary.

A Statement of the Purposes of the National Committee for the Defense of Political Prisoners stated that:

The National Committee for the Defense of Political Prisoners has been formed to aid workers to organize and to defend themselves against terror and suppression ... The National Committee recognizes the right of workers to organize, strike and picket, their right to freedom of speech, press and assembly, and it will aid in combating any violation of those rights, through legal means, and above all, by stimulating a wide public interest and protest.

The group was considered one of eleven "subversive organizations", drawn up on 3 April 1947 at the request of Tom C. Clark.

== See also ==
- Political prisoners in the United States
