= Peace Information Center =

1950 Anti-War Organisation

The Peace Information Center (PIC) was an anti-war organization based in the United States which provided information on peace initiatives in other countries, and promoted the Stockholm appeal. The organization was in existence from April 3 to October 12, 1950. Members included O. John Rogge, W. E. B. Du Bois, John T. McManus, Paul Robeson, C. B. Baldwin, Albert E. Kahn, Johannes Steel, Gene Weltfish, Leon Strauss, Elizabeth Moos, Kyrle Elkin, Abbot Simon and Shirley Graham.

W. E. B. Du Bois, a staunch opponent of nuclear weapons, was chairman of the Peace Information Center. It worked to publicize the Stockholm Peace Appeal in the United States. The primary purpose of the appeal was to gather signatures on a petition, asking world governments to ban all nuclear weapons. The PIC issued a publication called Peacegram that reported on international developments related to peace.

The U.S. Justice Department alleged that the PIC was acting as an agent of the Soviet Union, and thus required the PIC to register with the federal government. Du Bois and other PIC leaders refused, and they were indicted for failure to register. Some of Du Bois's associates distanced themselves from him and the NAACP refused to issue a statement of support, but many leftists and labor figures, including Langston Hughes, supported Du Bois. In late 1952, with defense attorney Vito Marcantonio arguing the case, the case was dismissed. The federal government confiscated Du Bois's passport during the PIC trial, and even though he was not convicted, they withheld it for eight years, because Du Bois had refused to sign a non-Communist affidavit.

In early 1951, following the dissolution of the PIC, DuBois and others established the American Peace Crusade.
