= American League Against War and Fascism =

Communist front group

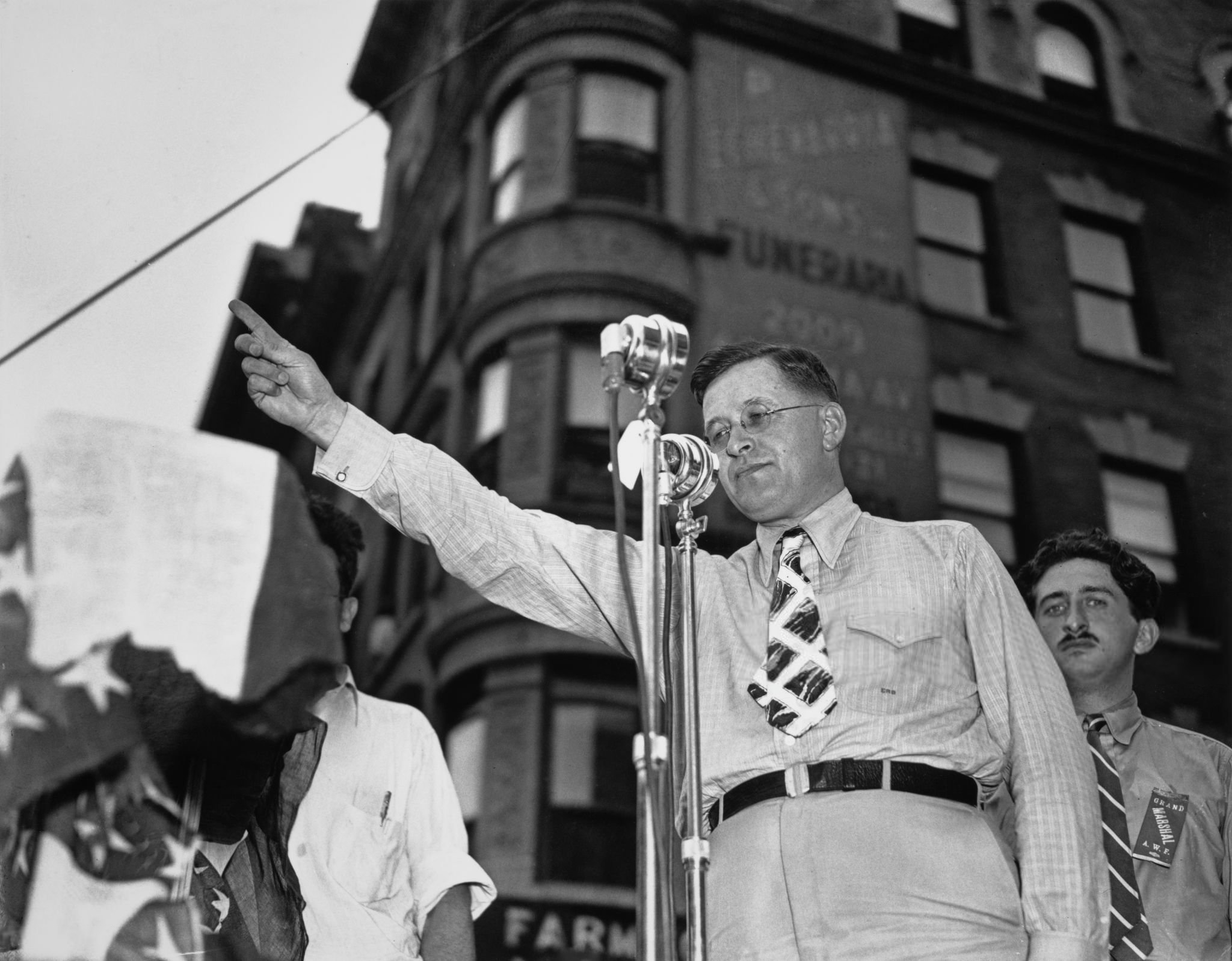
Minnesota Governor Elmer A. Benson addresses an American League Against War and Fascism rally in Harlem, New York, August 7, 1937

The American League Against War and Fascism was an organization formed in 1933 by the Communist Party USA and pacifists united by their concern as Nazism and Fascism rose in Europe. In 1937 the name of the group was changed to the American League for Peace and Democracy. Rev. Dr. Harry F. Ward headed the organization. It was the US affiliate of the World Committee Against War and Fascism.

== Organizational history ==
The American League was formed at the US Congress Against War, a gathering of activists arranged by the CPUSA in 1933.

The American League Against War and Fascism, attempted to attract as broad a following as possible and included members of the Roosevelt administration. By 1937, its Communist Party members boasted that 30 percent of the entire organized labor movement was represented in the League, and labor delegates occupied 413 of the 1416 seats at the national convention. African-Americans were also well represented in both the leadership and rank-and-file delegates.

In 1937 the organization changed its name to the American League for Peace and Democracy. Helen Silvermaster was associated with this group.

At its peak in 1939, the American League claimed over 20,000 dues paying members, and 1,023 affiliated organizations, bringing its combined membership to around 7 million members.

=== Dissolution ===
The American League dissolved after the 1939 signing of the Molotov–Ribbentrop Pact, a non-aggression treaty between Joseph Stalin's Soviet Union and Adolf Hitler's Nazi Germany that ended the CPUSA's anti-Hitler activity until the 1941 Nazi invasion of the USSR, discouraged its non-communist members. Its communist elements then influenced the founding of the American Peace Mobilization front to lobby against American help for the Allies, particular the United Kingdom under Prime Minister Winston Churchill, in their struggle against Hitler in the opening years of World War II.

== Members ==
Leaders included J. B. Matthews, and Rev. Harry F. Ward.

Prominent members included Earl Browder, Roger Baldwin, Paul Reid, William Spofford, Henry Wadsworth Longfellow Dana, Israel Amter, A. J. Muste, Dorothy Detzer, William Pickens, Oscar Ameringer, William Z. Foster, Devere Allen, Robert, Minor, and Elizabeth Bentley (later Soviet spy, later FBI informant).

== Publications ==
The League produced a monthly broadsheet entitled FIGHT Against War and Fascism, published in New York City under the editorship of Liston M. Oak.

== See also ==
- List of anti-war organizations
