= American Peace Mobilization =

Anti-war group established in 1940

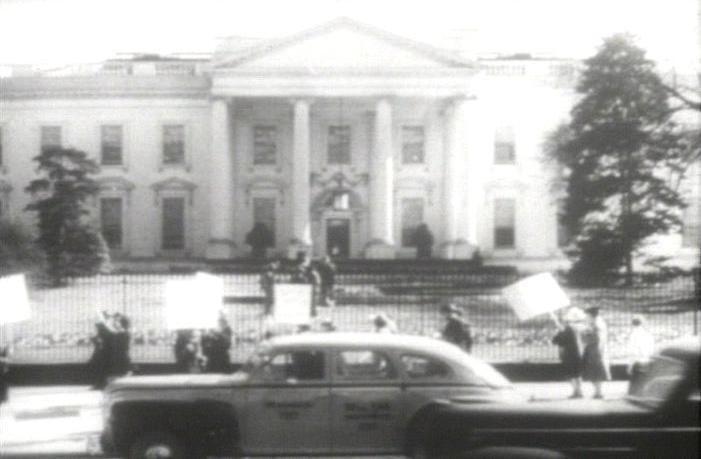
A protest of the American Peace Mobilization held at the White House in 1941.

The American Peace Mobilization (APM) was a peace group established in 1940 to oppose American aid to the Allies in World War II before the United States entered the war. It was officially cited in 1947 by United States Attorney General Tom C. Clark on the Attorney General's List of Subversive Organizations for 1948, as directed by President Harry S. Truman's Executive Order 9835.

== Organizational history ==
=== Establishment ===
The American Peace Mobilization (APM) was launched as the "Emergency Peace Mobilization" at a Chicago convention during Labor Day weekend in September 1940, a gathering attended by about 6,000 delegates. The group was formed from remnants of the American League for Peace and Democracy, an anti-war organization funded by the Communist International and controlled by the Communist Party, USA which attempted to build an American–Soviet defense alliance against potential aggression in Europe by Nazi Germany. The League dissolved with the signing in 1939 of the Molotov–Ribbentrop Pact, in which the Soviet Union and Germany pledged not to engage in military action against each other.

With the Soviets seemingly protected from Nazi Germany by the non-aggression treaty, the Soviet Union's focus turned from overt anti-Fascist militancy to "peace;" the members of the various national groups affiliated with the Comintern followed suit.

The Chicago convention adopted a platform called "Five Planks to Defend America,". Its demands included:

1. Keep Out of War
2. Defeat Militarism and Regimentation
3. Restore the Bill of Rights
4. Stop War Profiteering; and
5. Guaranteed a Decent Living Standard for All

In conjunction with these goals, the APM was particularly active in attempting to halt military conscription, and sought to serve as a Communist-led "mass organization" that sought to bring together trade unions, student groups, women's organizations, and anti-war church organizations under one umbrella.

In the midst of the London Blitz and the Battle of Britain, APM also agitated for the end of "warmonger" President Franklin Roosevelt's Lend-Lease program, and any other U.S. aid to the United Kingdom. The group conducted a 1,029-hour non-stop peace demonstration in front of the White House, a protest which ironically ended on June 21, 1941—one day before the Nazis invaded the Soviet Union.

=== Policy reversal ===
With the German invasion of the Soviet Union, the pro-Soviet activists within the APM again reversed their previous agenda almost overnight, now demanding immediate U.S. entry into the war. APM changed its name yet again, to the American Peoples' Mobilization. While the Communist Party and its various "pro-peace" front organizations completely reversed their position on the war the moment the pact was violated, the non-interventionists of America First continued their opposition until the U.S. was attacked on December 7.

=== National Committee to Win the Peace ===
During the Cold War, the group shifted its political stance towards pacifism and rebranded itself the National Committee to Win the Peace. The organization campaigned for issues such as nuclear disarmament and the withdrawal of American involvement in China, the Philippines and the civil war in Greece.

== Personnel ==
The Executive Secretary of the APM was Frederick V. Field, formerly the head of the Communist-sponsored American Council of the Institute of Pacific Relations. Field was the author of two book-length treatments of American investment and financial exploitation in the Far East and was editor of the monthly magazine Amerasia. Field was joined in the national office in Washington, DC by Administrative Secretary Marion Briggs and the following group of formal officials:

- John B. Thompson, Chairman
- Theodore Dreiser, Vice Chairman
- Jack McMichael, Vice Chairman
- Vito Marcantonio, Vice Chairman
- Reid Robinson, Vice Chairman
- Katherine Terrill, Vice Chairman
- Max Yergan, Vice Chairman

== See also ==
- List of anti-war organizations
