= Clarence Miller (activist) =

American labor union activist

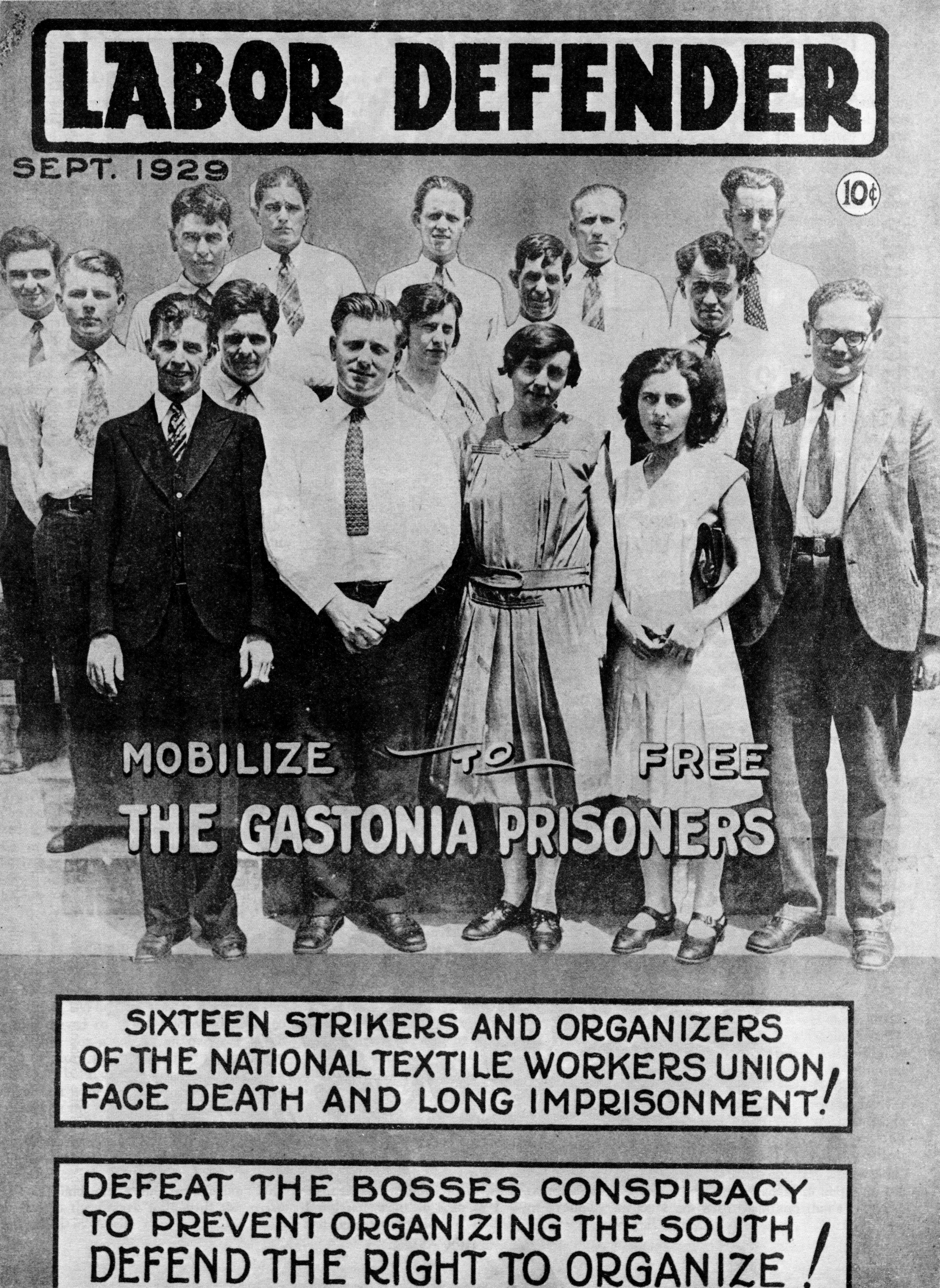
- Clarence Miller (among the 16 prisoners in this photo from International Labor Defense magazine)
- Born: 1906
- Citizenship: American
- Known for: Loray Mill strike defendant
- Political party: Communist Party USA
- Criminal charge: Murder of policeman during strike
- Spouse: Edith Saunders

Clarence Miller (born 1906) was a 20th-century American labor activist who, as a member of the Young Communist League USA, participated in the 1926 Passaic textile strike (January 25, 1926 – March 1, 1927) and the 1929 Loray Mill strike (AKA Gastonia Strike) (March 30, 1929 – June 7, 1929), in which he and six other labor leaders were found guilty of murder.

== Background ==
Clarence Miller was born in 1906 to "middle-class parents." He joined the Young People's Socialist League "while still in school."

== Career ==
Miller was a leader of the Young Communist League.

=== 1926 Passaic Strike ===
In 1926, Clarence Miller was a strike leader during the Passaic strike, along with Kate Gitlow (mother of Benjamin Gitlow), Elizabeth Gurley Flynn. On February 2, 1926, Miller met with Albert Weisbord, William Weinstone, Joseph Zack, and others named Kovetz, Blumkin, Baylin, and Dyaik. International Labor Defense mentioned Miller ("another of the young militants") faced probably prison term. Jack Rubinstein and Miller was held on $10,000 bail. On May 17, 1926, the case against Rubinstein and Miller was dismissed. On June 18, 1926, Miller spoke to a YCL Youth Conference in New York City.

=== 1929 Gastonia Strike ===
On March 30, 1929, Fred Erwin Beal of the National Textile Workers Union led the Loray Mill strike, better known as the 1929 Gastonia Strike. In late April 1929, Miller and his wife arrived in Gastonia with CPUSA representative Jack Johnstone. On June 7, 1929, Miller was one of 16 workers arrested during the strike. Other "communists among the prisoners" included: Fred Beal, Vera Bush, Amy Schechter, and "19-year old Sophie Melvin of the Young Communist League." All 16 faced threat of the electric chair. On October 6, 1929, Miller testified about dynamiting of strike headquarters. Edith Saunders Miller, Miller's wife, testified that "she had taught the children in the strikers' tent colony to strive for a Soviet-style government of workers and farmers." She "avowed almost all of the Communist principles that Beal had carefully avoided." (In 1949, Beal wrote, "Comrade Edith Miller was addressing the Court, but she was anticipating the commendation of Stalin's lackeys in New York and Moscow.") On October 21, 1929, seven of the Gastonia strike leaders and union members were found guilty of the murder of O.F. Aderholt, chief of police: Fred Beal, Clarence Miller, George Carter, Joseph Harrison, W.M. McGinnis, and Louis McLaughlin. Beal later noted, "It was characteristic of Southern justice that the four Yankee 'foreigners'–George Carter, Joseph Harrison, Clarence Miller, and I–were given the more severe sentences... from seventeen to twenty years of hard labor in the State prison at Raleigh."

On October 31, 1929, Miller wrote a letter to Max Bedacht, who was acting Party leader at the time, following the expulsion of Jay Lovestone) in which he complained that "Beal had lost faith in the Party" and was blaming International Labor Defense for losing them the case. He suggested that the Party send Beal on a national tour to help him recover his faith.

After the trial, William F. Dunne, editor of the Daily Worker, offered to help the condemned escape to the Soviet Union. Clarence Miller, his wife, Beal, and three other co-defendants secretly raised funds and secured fake passports and left the States. "Miller was personally all for skipping" bail and fleeing to Russia. Miller and Harrison traveled first. Beal traveled second. (In September 1931, when Beal made a second trip to Russia, he did so in the company of Myra Page and her husband, John Mackey.)

In a 1937 article, Beal wrote, "I could not, like Clarence Miller and so many other complaisant dream-walkers, convince myself that the suffering and futility which I saw everywhere in Stalin-land were but figments of the Capitalist imagination."In September 1931, In his 1949 memoir, he wrote:

Only Clarence Miller, who was never a worker and whose connection with the Gastonia strike was accidental, blossomed out in Soviet Russia as a "Red professor" and occupied a comfortable apartment, enjoying the prosperity of Soviet bureaucracy.

He worked for the Comintern, as did his wife when she traveled to Russia to live with him.

On June 27, 1931, the Lovestoneite newspaper Revolutionary Age mentioned an article on the Young Communist League that "Clarence Miller was district organizer back in 1928."

On August 9, 1949, Joseph Zack Kornfeder testified before the House Un-American Activities Committee (HUAC) regarding Communist infiltration of American labor unions: In response to the question "Did many Americans attend the Academy of Red Professors?" he said:

There were two that I know of... Sam Don, D-O-N, who later became editor of the Daily Worker, and another one was Miller, I believe Clarence Miller. After his graduation he was utilized in the apparatus of the Communist International. I don't know to what extent he became active in the American Communist Party, however. I haven't seen his name in any public activity.

== Personal life ==
Miller married Edith Saunders.

In 1926, Miller changed from Socialist to Communist Party allegiance during the Passaic Strike.

Beal stressed that Miller was "not of proletarian origin" and "never a proletarian."

According to Vera Buch Weisbord, Miller had supported Jay Lovestone but left the Lovestoneites for the main CPUSA. Weisbord (wife of the best known Passaic strike leader, Albert Weisbord–a Lovestoneite) said that the Party played up the roles of Clarence Miller and his wife; in fact, their roles in the Gastonia strike were minimal. Beal described Miller's role similarly.

== Legacy ==
In 1926, Sam Krieger took "Clarence Miller" as his Party name, which he used for his chapter in the 1926 book The Law of Social Revolution, published under the lead of Scott Nearing.

Miller appeared in the documentary The Passaic Film Strike (1926).

== See also ==
- Young Communist League USA
- 1926 Passaic textile strike
- The Passaic Textile Strike (film)
- Fred Erwin Beal
- Loray Mill strike
- Sam Krieger
- Textile Workers Union of America
- Joseph Zack Kornfeder

== Sources ==
- Beal, Fred E. (September 1937). "I Was a Communist Martyr". American Mercury.
- Beal, Fred Erwin (1949). Red Fraud: An Expose of Stalinism. Tempo Publishers.
- Chambers, Whittaker (May 1952). Witness. New York: Random House. pp. 202.
- Disler, Matthew (16 July 2018). "This Crusading Socialist Taught America's Workers to Fight—in 1929". Narratively: Hidden History.
- Dunne, William F (1 September 1926). Gastonia: Citadel of the Class Struggle in the New South (PDF). National Textile Workers Union.
- Fried, Albert, ed. (1997). Communism in America: A History in Documents. Columbia UP. ISBN 978-0231102353.
- Gitlow, Benjamin (1940). I Confess: The Truth About American Communism. E.P. Dutton. pp. 370.
- "Equal Justice". International Labor Defense. 1926: 104.
- Page, Myra; Looper Baker, Christina (1996). In a Generous Spirit: A First-Person Biography of Myra Page. University of Illinois Press. ISBN 9780252065439.
- Salmond, John A (2014). Gastonia 1929: The Story of the Loray Mill Strike. UNC Press Books. ISBN 9781469616933.
- Smith, Elmer (27 June 1931). "An Appeal to the League Convention" (PDF). Revolutionary Age: 2.
- Taylor, Gregory S (2009). The History of the North Carolina Communist Party. UP South Carolina. ISBN 9781570038020.
- Youth Meeting. Textile Strike Bulletin. 14 May 1926. Archived from the original on 17 March 2002. Alt URL
- Youth Meeting. Textile Strike Bulletin. 18 June 1926b. Archived from the original on 6 August 2002. Alt URL
- "The Coming Paterson Strike" (PDF). The Militant. 8 March 1930. p. 2.
- Thrasher, Sue; Wise, Leah; Beecher, John; Naison, Mark; Harding, Vincent; Herring, Neill; Lawrence, Ken; Hunter, Chuck; Weaver, Tony; Wells, Mike; Hunter, Darryl; Murrah, Bill; Ansley, Fran; Bell, Brenda; Reece, Florence; Dombrowski, James A; Roberts, Grace; Neal, Larry; Reagon, Bernice; Wolcott, Marion Post; Weisbord, Vera Buch; Ashbaugh, Carolyn; Dan McCurry, Dan (1974). No More Moanin. Institute for Southern Studies. ISBN 978-0943810027.
- Vorse, Mary Heaton (1927). The Passaic Textile Strike, 1926-1927. General Relief Committee of Textile Strikers. p. 91.
- Weisbord, Vera Buch (1974). "Gastonia, 1929: Strike at the Loray Mill". Southern Exposure.
- Weisbord, Vera Buch (1977). A Radical Life. Indiana University Press. ISBN 9780253347732.

== External sources ==
- Clarence Miller at IMDb
- American Film Institute - Clarence Miller
- Red Fraud: An Expose of Stalinism (introduced by Ferdinand Lundberg, prefaced by James T. Farrell) (1949) Beal (1949)
- Register of the William T. Poole collection: Correspondence with Clarence Miller 1928-1929
