= The Passaic Textile Strike (film) =

1926 film

- Directed by: Samuel Russak
- Written by: Margaret Larkin (titles)
- Produced by: Alfred Wagenknecht (producer)
- Starring: See below
- Cinematography: Lester Balog; Sam Brody; Bill Schwarzfeller
- Release date: October 1926
- Running time: 70 minutes
- Country: United States
- Languages: Silent, English titles

The Passaic Textile Strike is a 1926 American silent film directed by Samuel Russak and produced by Alfred Wagenknecht. The film was produced to raise public awareness and financial support for the 1926 Passaic textile strike, which involved over 15,000 New Jersey textile mill workers in a work stoppage lasting more than a year. Although in good part a fictional melodrama, The Passaic Textile Strike is regarded as important by film historians both for its documentary footage and for the fact that it is one of the only early American labor films to have been preserved largely intact.

== History ==
=== Origins of the film ===
Activists in the Workers (Communist) Party were important leaders of a strike of largely immigrant factory workers in several large wool and silk mills located in and around Passaic, New Jersey, a walkout of over 15,000 workers which began in January 1926. As a means of building public sympathy and generating funds for support of the strikers, the Communist Party, in conjunction with the International Workers Aid branch of the Communist International, shot a film dramatizing the alleged injustices faced by the striking workers and depicting the efforts of the Communist Party to lead the impoverished millworkers against their exploitive employers in a heroic light.

=== Synopsis ===
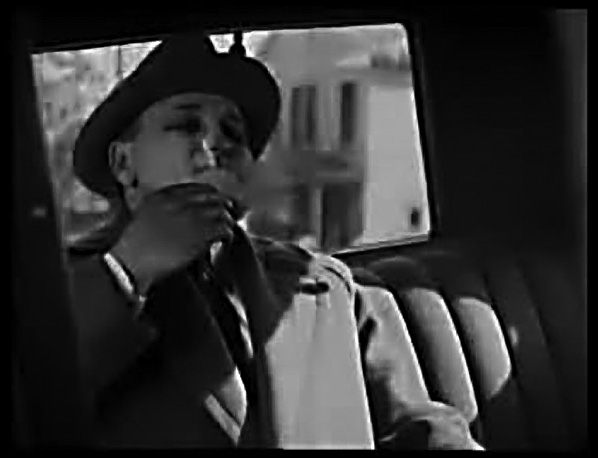
Mr. Mulius enjoys a smoke to cap his amorous afternoon.

Reels 1 and 2 of the film, "The Prologue," present a melodramatic depiction of the life of a fictional Polish worker, Stefan Breznac, who comes to Passaic from Europe in 1907. Stefan takes a job in a woolen mill and earns a raise. He sends for his sweetheart, Kada, to come to America to share in his newfound prosperity. The couple start a family, but are soon struck by the misfortune of Stefan's employer imposing wage cuts which force the Breznac's to withdraw their 14-year-old daughter, Vera, from school to go to work to help support the family.

The "big boss" of the mill, a fictional German capitalist named Mr. Mulius, takes a fancy to the teenager and makes her his assistant at a raise of wages so as to win her confidence. That afternoon the porcine bourgeois takes her home via a roundabout route through the countryside. On cue, Mr. Mulius' driver pretends to run out of gas in the middle of nowhere so that his employer may have his way with the helpless young girl. A disheveled Vera is eventually dropped off at home as her brazen employer enjoys a satisfying cigarette.

Two months later, Vera discovers that Mr. Mulius is married and is abruptly terminated, leaving the family again in dire financial straits. Already working 66 hours a week, Stefan Breznac takes on a 72-hour week to make ends meet. He is warned by a workmate that the increase in work might kill him, but proceeds nonetheless. The increase in work breaks his health. Stefan is forced to accept work as a lower pay-rate as a transporter instead of working as a weaver as he had previously. Stefan finally sees the light and urges his fellows to form a union, but dies two days later, leaving his widow Kada as the sole breadwinner for the household. Kada takes a job working the night shift at the mill, and the prologue draws to a close.

The main part of the film, a section titled "The Strike," documented the events of the actual 1926 Passaic textile strike, emphasizing the activity a number of key figures in the Communist and non-Communist workers' movement as themselves. Historian Philip S. Foner recounts:

The film then showed the strikers braving police clubs and shotguns, fire hoses in zero weather and tear gas bombs. The huge mass meetings, with ten thousand workers participating, were shown with the strike leaders and other speakers addressing the strikers. Relief activities were also depicted, as were the picket-line lunch counters, the Victory Playground for the strikers' children, and the specific organization of women strikers and sympathizers. Audiences were deeply moved by the film, especially by the scenes showing the 'atrocious police brutality against the strikers, including girl pickets and even the children of the strikers.'"

While some of the strike footage was apparently reenacted, most of this section was clearly filmed as events were taking place, giving the surviving film additional interest as a historical documentary. The film's importance is further enhanced by the fact that it is one of the only early American labor films to have been preserved essentially intact.

=== Legacy ===
The Passaic Textile Strike premiered in Passaic, New Jersey in October 1926.

The film is in the Library of Congress film collection. Only five of the seven reels were believed to have survived, with reels number 5 and 7 missing. More recently, however, a complete copy was donated to the Tamiment Library at New York University, and Reel 5 on YouTube was preserved by the Library of Congress.

== Cast ==
- George Ashkenuzi as himself
- John J. Ballam as himself
- Lena Chernenko as herself
- Gustav Deak as himself
- Thomas DeFazio as himself
- Robert W. Dunn as himself
- Elizabeth Gurley Flynn as herself
- Leo Krzycki as himself
- Joseph Magliacano as himself
- Clarence Miller as himself
- Ella Reeve Bloor as herself
- Jack Rubenstein as himself
- Leona Smith as herself
- Norman Thomas as himself
- Alfred Wagenknecht as himself
- Albert Weisbord as himself
- Ellen Wilkinson as herself
- Martin Winkler as himself
