= Communist League of Struggle =

- Abbreviation: CLS
- Founders: Albert Weisbord; Vera Buch
- Founded: March 15, 1931
- Dissolved: 1937
- Split from: Communist League of America
- Ideology: Trotskyism
- Political position: Far-left
- International affiliation: International Left Opposition

The Communist League of Struggle (CLS) was a small communist organization active in the United States during the 1930s. Founded by Albert Weisbord and his wife, Vera Buch, who were veterans of the Left Socialist movement and the Communist Party USA, the CLS briefly affiliated with Leon Trotsky independently of the Communist League of America. It was affiliated to the International Bureau of Revolutionary Youth Organizations until 1935. The small group dwindled and quietly was terminated in the spring of 1937.

== Organizational history ==
=== Formation ===
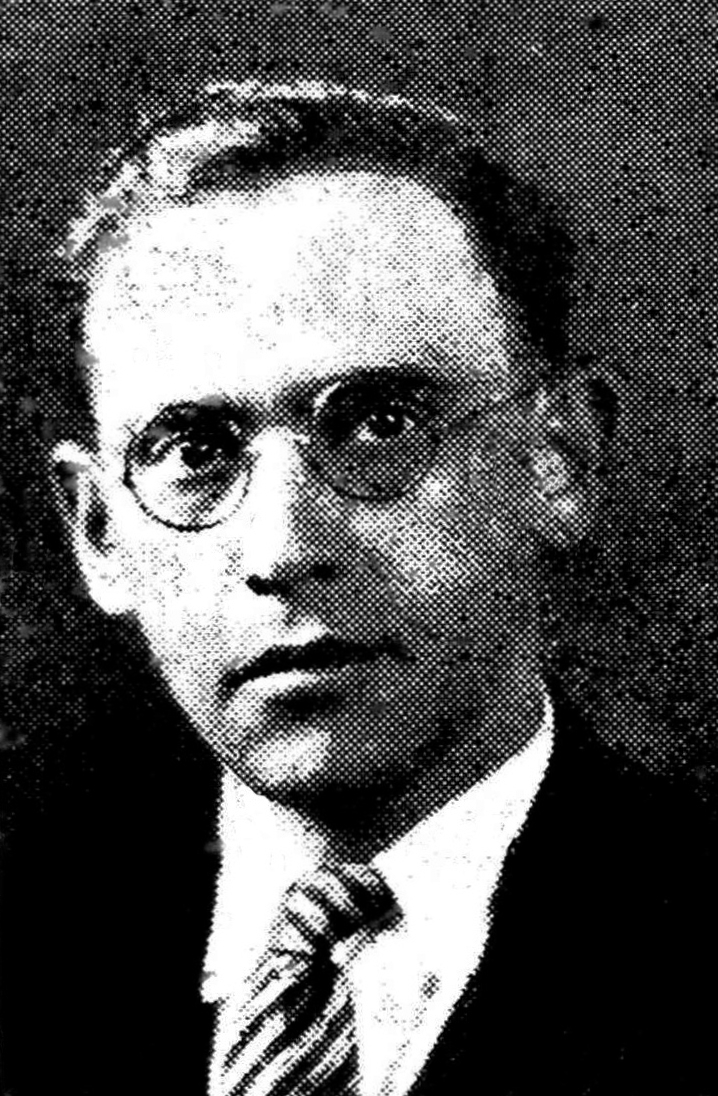
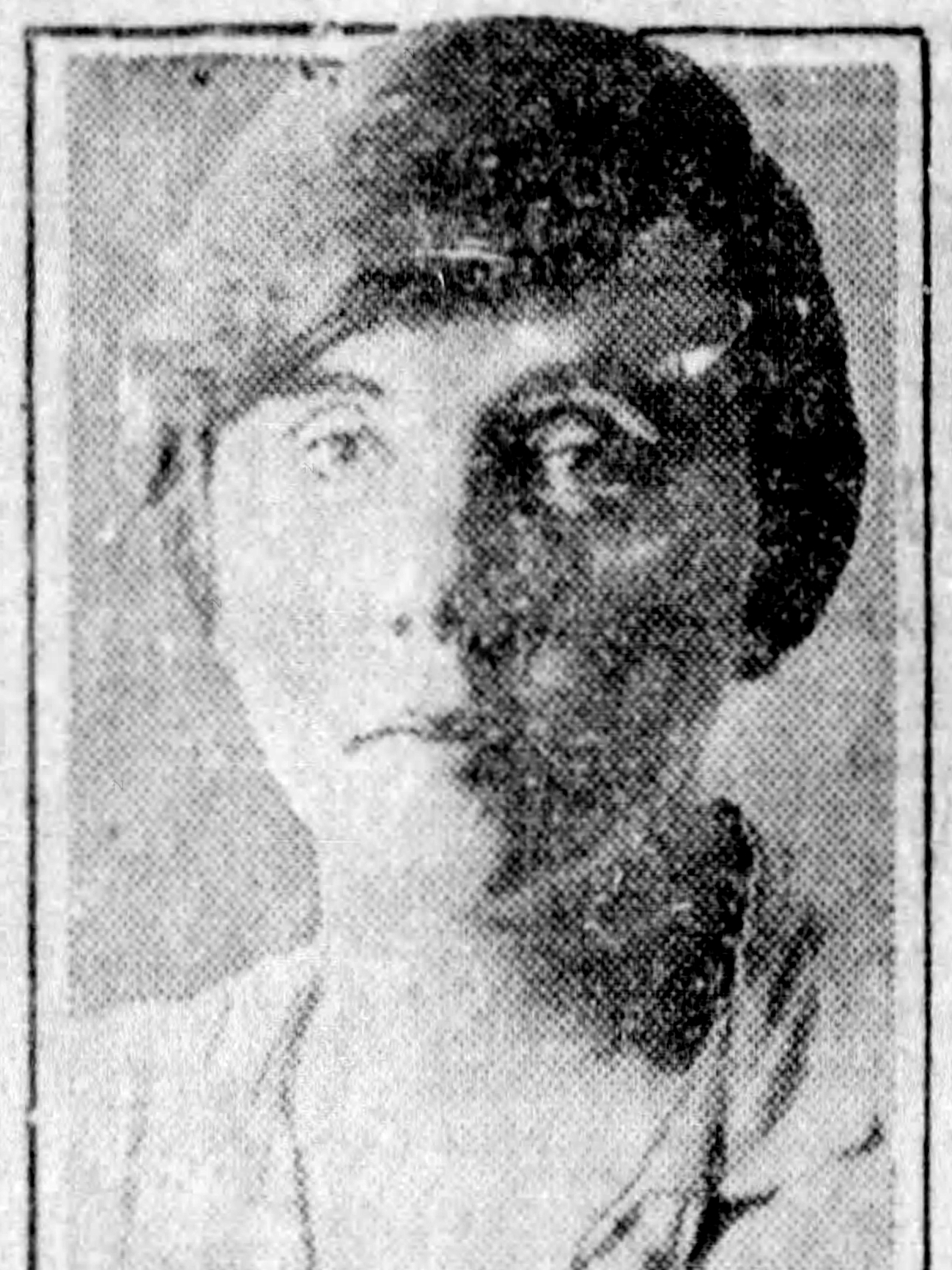
Labor organizers Albert Weisbord and Vera Buch, leading figures in the Communist League of Struggle.

The Communist League of Struggle (CLS) was a factional offshoot of the Communist League of America (CLA), a Trotskyist political party headed by James P. Cannon. The organization was formed on March 15, 1931, owing to what it declared "the principled errors of the other Communist groups" and "organizational violence...within the Communist movement."

The leading forces in the CLS were textile union labour leader Albert Weisbord, a former Socialist Party youth leader, 1924 graduate of Harvard Law School and member of the Workers Party of America from that same year, and his wife Vera Buch, an activist in the Left Wing Section of the Socialist Party from 1919 and member of the Communist Party of America from 1920. The pair had made names for themselves as leaders of the 1926 Passaic Textile Strike, a walkout of nearly 15,000 New Jersey workers in the wool and silk mills of the town of Passaic and its environs.

Weisbord had been expelled from the Communist Party in 1929, ostensibly for being undeciplined in his activities. Instead of joining with Jim Cannon and his lieutenants Martin Abern and Max Shachtman in the Communist League of America, however, Weisbord had determined to start his own group.

The CLS pointedly styled itself a vanguard party adhering to "the International Left Opposition, led by Leon Trotsky." In a detailed statement on general policy issued at the group's foundation, the CLS declared that it "heartily endorses" the concept of the united front and called for the formation of a "mass labor party on a federated basis that will move the working clas of this country to independent political action."

The CLS took a harsh rhetorical stance towards the other three Communist organizations that existed at the time of its formation — the official Communist Party USA, Cannon's Communist League of America (Opposition), and Jay Lovestone's Communist Party (Majority Group), declaring that "it considers the other three groups as 'right-wing' opportunist groups, each differing in form and manner, but each overestimating the enemy and underestimating the proletariat." At the time of his group's formation Weisbord brashly announced the birth of "not an isolated sect, but a two-fisted hard group of communists.”

Weisbord made an effort to gain the mantle of official sanction from the exiled Trotsky, writing to him in 1931. Trotsky could not be moved from his support of Cannon's CLA organization, however, replying to Weisbord with a letter which he carbon-copied to the National Executive Committee of the Communist League of America. Trotsky was harshly critical of Weisbord's decision to strike out on his own with a new parallel organization:

"I cannot adopt your standpoint. Your criticism of the American League seems to me one-sided, artificial, and terribly exaggerated. You throw the League and the right wing together, which shows that you utterly disregard the fitness of things. You make fun of the publishing activity of the League and counterpose your 'mass action' to it. Have you any mass activity behind you? Before one turns to the masses, one must construct a principled basis. One begins as a propaganda group and develops in the direction of mass action. * * *

"You declare yourself loyal to the International Left Opposition. Organizationally this is not the case. This can therefore be understood only in the sense of a general solidarity of ideas. * * * If the solidarity of ideas with the Left Opposition really means anything to you, you must build a bridge back to the League...."

Weisbord was moved by Trotsky's publicized rebuke to enter into unity negotiations with the CLA, although differences in personality and perspective proved to be insurmountable and the CLA terminated the talks in October 1932.

The CLS maintained an independent existence throughout its existence. In 1935 it briefly flirted with dissolving into the Workers Party of the United States formed by the joining of forces of A.J. Muste's American Workers Party with Cannon's Communist League of America, a decision which was ultimately rejected. "We shall not join the Workers Party, but we have no doubt but the best elements who may have gathered for the moment within the fields of the Workers Party will eventually find themselves fighting shoulder to shoulder with us," the CLS declared.

=== Dissolution ===
The Communist League of Struggle passed silently from the scene in the spring 1937, with no announcement made of the group's demise made in the final issue of its official organ.

=== Membership size ===
The Communist League of Struggle (CLS) did not publish a tally of its membership. Given the fact that the Communist League of America (Opposition), the group from which it split, had a membership of "less than 200" during the 1931-1933 period, it seems highly probable that the CLS began with a membership of fewer than 50. The group seems to never have attained critical mass and to have dwindled to a small handful of activists during its final years.

The group was severely weakened by the death of one of its leading members, the Polish-born Sam Fisher, of tuberculosis in early 1935, at the age of 27. An expelled member of the Communist Party, Fisher was active in the organization of unemployed workers in New York City and as an organizer for the United Laundry Workers Union and was the New Jersey organizer for the CLS.

=== Official organs ===
The primary journal of the Communist League of Struggle was a mimeographed newsletter called The Class Struggle. The publication was issued approximately monthly with occasional combined issues. The first issue appeared in May 1931 and the final issue, the 53rd overall, was dated "April/May 1937."

The CLS also issued several issues of a shop newspaper for shipyard workers called The Red Dreadnaught.

== Publications ==
- For a New Communist International. New York: Communist League of Struggle, 1933.
- Communism and the Social Order. New York: Communist League of Struggle, 1934.
- The Struggle for Negro Emancipation: The Position of the Internationalist-Communists of the United States. New York: Communist League of Struggle, 1935.
- The Struggle of the Unemployed: The Position of the Internationalist-Communists of the United States. New York: Communist League of Struggle, 1935.
- The Struggle for Communism: The Position of the Internationalist-Communists of the United States. (aka Theses of the Communist League of Struggle) New York: Communist League of Struggle, 1935.
