= San Francisco Film and Photo League =

The San Francisco Film and Photo League was one of the associated groups of the Workers Film and Photo League. Active from 1933 to 1934, the San Francisco General Strike ended their activity in 1934, with the disappearance of equipment and films during vigilante raids associated with the strike. Members of the San Francisco Film and Photo League were Lester Balog, Otto Hagel and Hansel Mieth. The one extant film produced by the group is "Century of Progress."
