= Vera Buch =

American political activist and union organizer (1895–1987)

Vera Wilhelmine Buch Weisbord
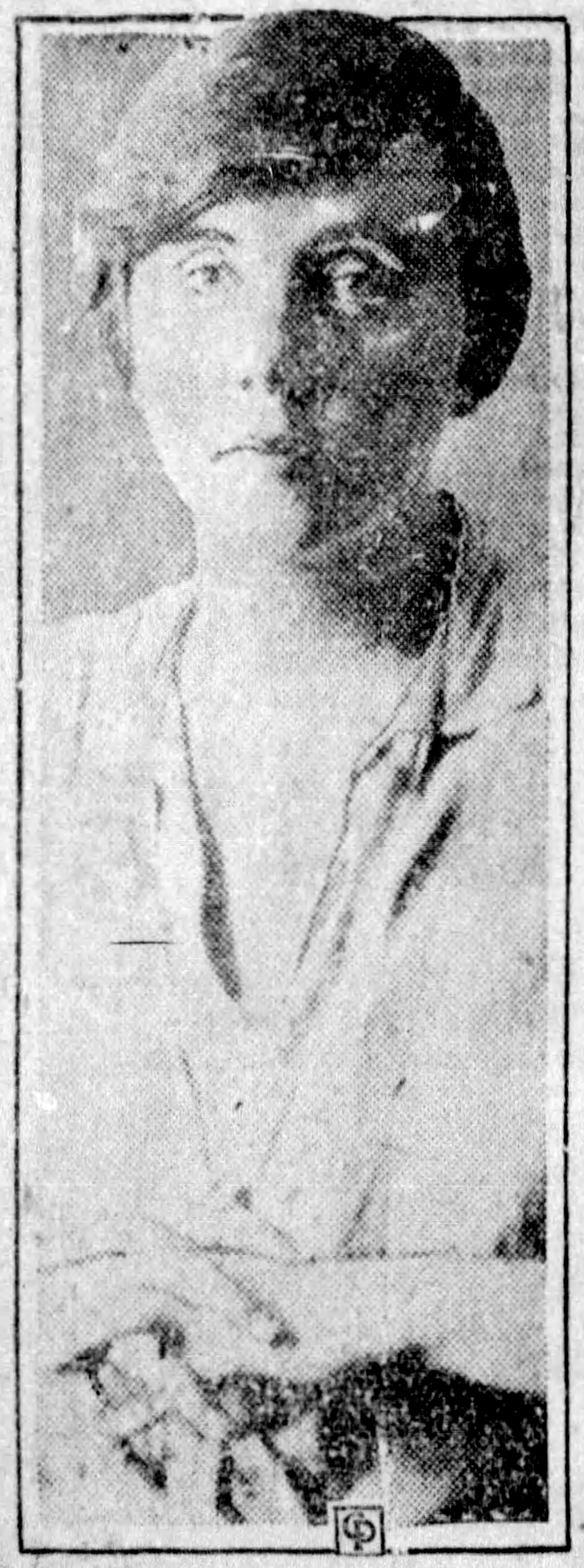
- Buch c. 1929
- Born: Vera Wilhelmine Buch; August 19, 1895; Forestville, Connecticut, U.S.
- Died: September 6, 1987 (aged 92); Chicago, Illinois, U.S.
- Other name: Leona Smith (pseudonym)
- Education: Hunter College
- Spouse: Albert Weisbord (m. 1938)
- Parents: John Casper Buch; Nellie Amelia Louisa Crawford

Vera Wilhelmine Buch Weisbord (August 19, 1895 – September 6, 1987) was an American political activist and union organizer.

== Early life ==
Vera Buch was born in Forestville, Connecticut on August 19, 1895. Her parents were John Casper Buch and Nellie Amelia Louisa Crawford. At an early age, the family moved to the Bronx, New York.

Buch studied at the Hunter High School and graduated from Hunter College in 1916. Shortly after that, she got tuberculosis and spent a year in a sanatorium. During her stay, she met a woman who inspired her to study socialist economic theory.

== Political activism and union organization ==
In 1918, Buch moved to Caldwell, New Jersey, where she got involved with the Left Wing Section of the Socialist Party. She later joined the Industrial Workers of the World and the Communist Party USA.

Under the pseudonym Leona Smith, she helped organize workers during the 1926 Passaic textile strike, the first mass strike led by communists in the United States. In Passaic, she met her future husband, Albert Weisbord. They moved to Detroit, where Buch edited several left-wing factory newsletters.

In 1928, she went to Pennsylvania to help organize women of the United Mine Workers in a coal miner's strike.

She was a union organizer of the Loray Mill strike of 1929 in Gastonia, North Carolina. The National Guard intervened and a local police chief was killed during the confrontation. Buch and 15 other people were arrested and were charged with the murder, but she was released when mistrial was declared.

The Loray Mill Strike was the last where Buch acted on behalf of the Communist Party USA (CPUSA) or the National Textile Workers Union (NTWU). Albert Weisbord was accused of being a Lovestoneite and was expelled from the CPUSA. In 1931, Buch and Weisbord founded the Communist League of Struggle to provide a Trotskyist alternative to the CPUSA.

Buch and Weisbord moved to Chicago in 1935, where they continued unionizing workers, and married in 1938.

In the 1940s, she worked with the Congress of Racial Equality and in the following decades she participated in the Civil Rights Movement.

== Last years ==
In 1952, Buch studied in the Art Institute of Chicago and produced more than 200 paintings over the next two decades.

In 1977, she published her autobiography A radical life.
