= Workers Film and Photo League (USA) =

1930s U.S. media creatives' group working for social change

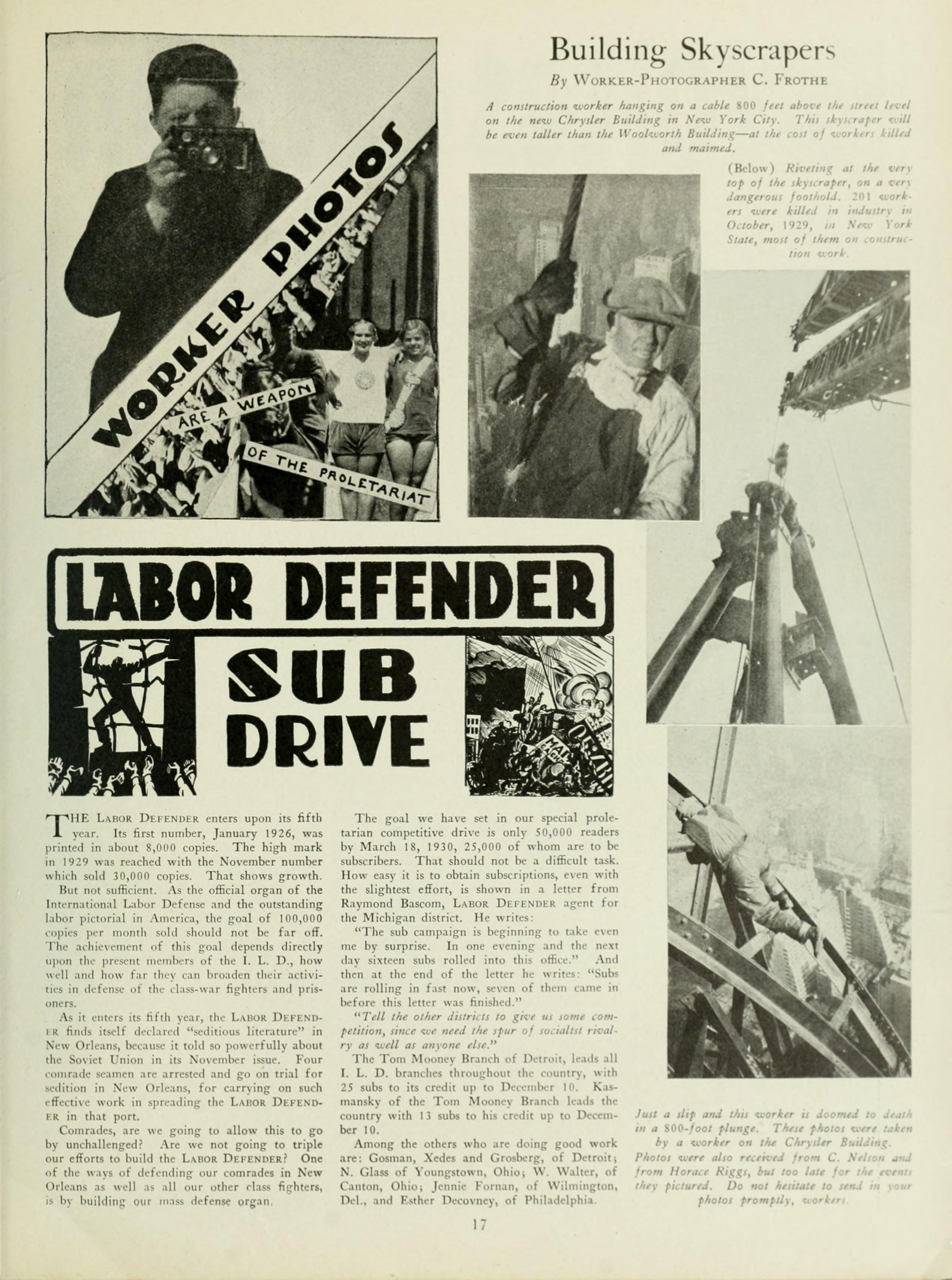
Pictures of the construction of the Chrysler Building by a worker-photographer published in Labor Defender, January 1930

The Workers Film and Photo League was an organization of filmmakers, photographers, writers and projectionists in the 1930s, dedicated to using film and photography for social change.

== History ==
Founded in 1930, the WFPL produced documentaries of the U.S. labor movement including the National Hunger marches of 1931 and 1932 and the Bonus March 1932. These newsreels were generally not distributed to mainstream theaters, but shown at party or trade union events. When shown in theaters, they often opened for films produced in Europe or the Soviet Union. In New York, the "Harry Alan Potamkin Film School" was established by the Workers Film and Photo League to train working-class filmmakers.

Initially affiliated with the Workers International Relief, the group first organized to project films at fundraising events for striking workers.

Although the best known chapter of the WFPL was in New York, groups in Los Angeles, Chicago, Detroit, and other cities created and screened documentaries under the "Film and Photo League" moniker. Nationally, the Film & Photo Leagues emerged as a loosely knit alliance of local organizations that provided leftist visual propaganda. Their efforts during the years of the early Depression helped to define social documentary film and photography as a genre.

Much has been made of the association of the Workers Film and Photo League with Communism, both in the United States and abroad. While many members were self identified Marxists and Communist Party USA members, the groups usually functioned independently. They were largely composed of idealists who saw the documentary film as a vital element of the movement for radical social change.

In 1933 "Workers" was dropped from the title and the New York organization became the Film and Photo League. The FPL survived for another year in New York, where its photographers formed the Photo League. Some filmmakers formed an independent private production company, others founded Nykino and some, later, the Frontier Film Group.

In other cities, such as Chicago and Los Angeles, Film and Photo League activities continued throughout the 1930s.

== Members of the WFPL ==
=== New York ===
- Lester Balog
- Tom Brandon
- Sam Brody
- Robert Del Duca
- Arnold S. Eagle
- Leo Hurwitz
- Lewis Jacobs
- Vic Kandel
- Irving Lerner
- Jay Leyda
- Nancy Naumburg
- David Platt
- Harry Alan Potamkin
- Julian Roffman
- Leo Seltzer
- Ralph Steiner
- Carl Vedro

=== Chicago ===
- Maurice Baillen
- Conrad Friberg, aka C.O. Nelson
- John Freitag
- Gordon Koster
- William Kruck
- John Masek
- Dr. William J. Twig

=== Detroit ===
- Joseph Hudyma
- Jack Auringer

=== San Francisco ===
- Lester Balog
- Otto Hagel
- Hansel Mieth

=== Los Angeles ===
- Louis Siminow

== Film and Photo League films ==
Although many of the films produced by the Film and Photo Leagues were destroyed in a 1935 storage fire in New York, some surviving films can be found at the Museum of Modern Art Film Study Center, New York; Film Center, School of the Art Institute of Chicago; and the Library of Congress, Washington D.C. A filmography was created by researchers in the 1970s.

- National Hunger March
- Bonus March
- Detroit Ford Massacre
- Workers Newsreels
- Halsted Street
- The Great Depression
- Century of Progress
- Berry Strike

== See also ==
- Proletarian Film League of Japan
