= Conrad Friberg =

American filmmaker and labor organizer

- Born: May 9, 1896; Chicago, Illinois, US
- Died: Sept 2 1989; California, US
- Other names: C.O. Nelson
- Occupations: Filmmaker; labor organizer

Conrad Friberg (1896–1989) was an American filmmaker, labor organizer and wallpaper hanger in Chicago, Illinois. Many of his films are credited to "C.O. Nelson". His best known work is Halsted Street, which he produced when a member and lead organizer in the Chicago Workers' Film & Photo League. Portions of Halsted Street were re-used in Halsted Street, USA (1995), directed by David Simpson and narrated by Studs Terkel.

Friberg was born in 1896 in Chicago, Illinois, to John Friberg and Anna Marie Nelson, both immigrants from Sweden. He attended the Copernicus School in Chicago until the 8th grade, leaving school before attending high school.

During World War I, Friberg began using his mother’s maiden name and moved from Chicago to New Orleans to avoid the draft. He became known as “Con” or C.O. Nelson. After operating a street car in New Orleans, he worked his way west to California, where he worked at a logging camp in Feather River Canyon, visited Mount Lassen, and traveled on a mail stage coach, photographing with a “post card” camera along the way.

Friberg's brother, musician James Friberg, was interviewed before the Special Committee on Victor L. Berger Investigation in 1919 regarding his activities in the Young People's Socialist League and interactions with William F. Kruse. In these hearings, it was also mentioned that Conrad Friberg had run the Young Socialist camp Yipsel at Fox Lake the previous year.

After the war, Friberg continued to use the name C.O. Nelson for his political film and photography work, as well as some articles in leftist publications. In the 1920s, he worked for the Federated Press, providing photographs for labor publications.

Friberg was associated with labor organizing through his work as president of the Chicago office workers union. In the late 1930s, he worked for an insurance company in Chicago. His wife, Mildred, worked at the Vilnius Lithuanian Daily paper for many years. He had one son, Carl.

== Films ==
- National Hunger March (contributor)
- Halsted Street
- The Farm
- Our Relations
- Swedish Cooperatives
- Mexican Earth
- Chicago Winter
- The Way it Was in San Francisco
