= Samuel Krieger =

American union organizer

- Born: August 20, 1902; Russian Empire
- Died: April 9, 1981 (aged 78); Rohnert Park, California
- Employer: Teamsters
- Political party: Industrial Workers of the World (IWW), International Brotherhood of Teamsters (Teamsters)

Samuel Krieger (1902–1981) was an American union organizer, IWW member, Teamsters member, and communist.

== Life ==
=== Background ===
Samuel Krieger was born in Russia on August 20, 1902. He came with his family to the United States at age two. He grew up in New York and New Jersey.

=== Union years ===
After grammar school, about age 12 and at the outbreak of World War I, he went to work in the aircraft industry.

Krieger was a "Wobbly" or member of the Industrial Workers of the World (IWW). He had been arrested; the American Civil Liberties Union helped gain his release.

He served as an international representative for the International Union of Mine, Mill and Smelter Workers.

=== Communist years ===
According to Whittaker Chambers, in early spring of 1925 Krieger was the "first American communist" he ever met. He took Chambers to his first-ever meeting of the Communist Party. En route, Krieger told Chambers his name, adding, "But my name in the party is 'Clarence Miller'." Chambers estimated the meeting consisted of 40–50 men and women of different nationalities who spoke predominantly English, Greek and Yiddish. Among those present, Krieger identified: Ben Gitlow, Gitlow's mother and father, Eve Chambers (real name Eve Dorf) and husband David Benjamin (real name Ben Davidson). Chambers claimed that Krieger and his wife Carol were largely in charge of the party's decision to admit him.

At the time, Chambers claimed, Krieger was circulation manager of the Statesman, a Yonkers-based newspaper. According to Chambers, Krieger (whose party membership was unknown to the paper) "pushed sales by giving bicycles to enterprising newsboys who, on competitive principles that would later be known as Stakhanovite, sold the most copies of that capitalist newspaper." Krieger then got Chambers his first work for the party, doing "Jimmie Higgins" work for the Daily Worker. He also got Chambers to study Marxism, most notably at the Rand School in a class on "the law of social revolution" taught by Scott Nearing.

Chambers learned of two factions that existed in the American party at that time. The first was headed by William Z. Foster, Alexander Bittelman, William F. Dunne, and James P. Cannon. The second was headed by Party secretary Charles Ruthenberg and Jay Lovestone.

Chambers doubted whether Krieger's communist allegiance outlasted the demise of his party marriage with Carol: "I had always felt that there were limits to Krieger's Marxism. He was a broken man. Perhaps he asked the party to find him an assignment in some area less memory-haunted than Yonkers ... I never asked what had become of him."

=== Teamsters years ===
In 1953, he became an organizer and business agent for the International Brotherhood of Teamsters. He worked with the Teamsters until retirement in 1972.

=== Retirement years ===
He partook in the "Radical Elders Oral History Project".

He appeared in two films:

- The Wobblies (1978, 1979)
- The Trials of Alger Hiss (1980)

== Personal and death ==
In 1925, Krieger was already married to Carol Krieger in a party marriage, which seems to fall apart the same year because "Carol had run away with Comrade Hardy."

His second marriage was to Sadie Shanblum Krieger, in 1944. After retirement in 1973, they resided in Rohnert Park, California, where he died on April 9, 1981. He was survived by his wife, Sadie, and two daughters. He was writing an autobiography at that time.

== Legacy ==
=== Weinstein lawsuit ===
In 1978, over a footnote, Krieger sued for libel against Allen Weinstein, author of Perjury; Alfred A. Knopf, Inc., the book's publisher; and The New Republic magazine. Weinstein had assumed that mention of a "Clarence Miller" at the 1929 Gastonia strike was Samuel Krieger; in fact, it was another Party member who had also used that famous man's name as a Party alias.

Although it was Krieger personally who was suing—reports vary from $3 million to $9 million—a "Legal Fund to Clear Sam Krieger" was formed.

The aim of the Krieger lawsuit and similar efforts was to discredit Whittaker Chambers as a witness in the trials of Alger Hiss:

This disputed quotes did not by themselves prove or disprove the guilt of Alger Hiss ... But Weinstein's disputed interviews all concerned the issue of Whittaker Chambers' credibility -- the central issue in the case. All the new sources [in Perjury] were marshaled by Weinstein to show that Chambers was a "truthful man."

The process of the lawsuit also more firmly established that Krieger had in fact been a member of the Communist Party. For example, the New York Magazine gave its article on the lawsuit the title "Communist Sues Hiss Historian." Newspapers reported that The Nation told the Associated Press how to locate Sam Krieger, Chambers' sponsor for Communist Party membership in 1925." Finally, Victor Navasky himself stated "Krieger [was] an important figure in the Hiss case because he introduced Whittaker Chambers into the Communist Party."

As the Associated Press noted at the time, Krieger's lawsuit coincided with a new effort by Hiss to seek exoneration: "Hiss, who has always maintained he was innocent, is now preparing a motion to set aside the guilty verdict under which he was imprisoned a quarter-century ago."

It also led to accusation that Krieger was a "fugitive from justice":

A one-time Communist Party organizer s emerging from the privacy of retirement to deny a 50-year-old murder and become a key figure in a sizzling literary-political debate over Alger Hiss ... Krieger said he is surrendering his privacy to step out and deny what Weinstein has written about him ... Krieger is a fugitive from justice ... "I was arrested in Rock Island, Ill. ... I was one of the four organizers of the hunger march in Washington, D.C. -- the newspapers will show that ... I was arrested in Bridgeport, Conn., for breaking up a German Bund meeting and leading a march of unemployed snow shovelers on city hall against a right-wing Socialist mayor." In Bridgeport, Conn., Friday, police confirmed that a Sam Krieger was arrested three times in 1933 and 1934. He was charged once with inciting breach of the peace and twice with inciting to riot.

=== Papers ===
An unnamed source placed Krieger's papers in the Archives of Labor and Urban Affairs at Wayne State University in March 1995, opened for research in August 1996. They record retirement activities, "reflecting his lifelong interests in human rights."

== See also ==
- International Brotherhood of Teamsters (Teamsters)
- Industrial Workers of the World (IWW)
- Whittaker Chambers
- Allen Weinstein
