= Lester Balog =

American photographer

- Born: April 18, 1905; Hungary
- Died: February 1976 (aged 70); California

Lester Balog (April 18, 1905 – February 1976) was a labor activist and founding member of the Workers' Film & Photo League.

Born in Hungary, he immigrated to the United States in the early 1920s. A soccer player in Budapest, after immigrating to the U.S. with his family as a teen, he joined the Labor Sports Union in New York. From there, he got involved with other Workers' organizations. In 1925, after mainstream media photographers were beaten during the Passaic Textile Strike in Passaic, New Jersey, he took up a camera to document the strike and the brutality of police toward the strikers. He became a "worker filmmaker" who helped to make the film, Passaic Textile Strike, one of the earliest surviving films about workers' struggles in the United States.

In 1926, at the age of 21, and one year from an engineering degree, Balog left Cooper Union in New York City to join the workers' movement. He designed banners and posters for political events, and continued to photograph and document the struggles of his era. He became a projectionist and showed "workers' films" to groups in theatres, union halls, community centers and other alternative settings.

In 1930, he and others in New York City took the name Film & Photo League.

In 1933, he left New York on a cross country film tour, showing Workers' Newsreels and the Soviet film "Mother" in over fifty cities. In San Francisco, he was active with the Film and Photo League there, and continued to project films at leftist events in California. He contributed to the only extant film of the San Francisco Film and Photo League, "Century of Progress," (1934) which he donated to The Walter P. Reuther Library of Wayne State University in the 1970s. The film featured footage of the 1933 Cotton Strike in Tulare County. Balog also donated other films portraying farm workers from the 1930s and 1960s, as well as a film he produced as a member of the "Miscellaneous Workers Union" portraying a Labor Day parade and actions in San Francisco, 1941.

In 1934, he was arrested in Tulare County, CA and jailed for showing films without a permit of the previous year's strikes to a group of farmworkers. From 1942–1945, he served in the Army. In the late 1940s, he was a photographer for the ILWU. In the 1950s, he moved to Cambria, CA with his wife and children, and ran a movie theater there. He moved to the Los Angeles area in the 1960s, and became an active member of the UAW. He continued to screen films throughout his life to activist audiences.

One of the famous photographs of Woody Guthrie was taken by Balog around 1941, showing Guthrie holding a guitar that says "This Machine Kills Fascists." The photograph was used on the cover of the Woody Archives 2009 release "My Dusty Road."
