= Margaret Larkin =

American musician (1899–1967)

- Born: July 7, 1899; Las Vegas, New Mexico
- Died: May 7, 1967 (aged 67); Mexico City, Mexico
- Occupations: writer, poet, singer-songwriter, researcher, and union activist
- Spouse(s): Liston Oak; Albert Maltz
- Relatives: Mira Larkin
- Writing career
- Period: 1922-1967
- Genres: fiction, non-fiction
- Notable works: The Six Days of Yad Mordechai; Seven shares in a Gold Mine; Singing Cowboy
- Notable awards: Kansas Authors' Club Poetry Prize; David Belasco Cup; Samuel French Prize

Margaret Larkin (July 7, 1899 – May 7, 1967) was an American writer, poet, singer-songwriter, researcher, journalist and union activist.

She wrote The Six Days of Yad Mordechai on a kibbutz in Israel and its stand against the Egyptian Army in 1948, Seven Shares in a Gold Mine about a murder conspiracy in Mexico, and the Singing Cowboy, a collection of Western folk songs. She won awards for her poem Goodbye—To My Mother and her play El Cristo.

== Life ==
Larkin was born on July 7, 1899, in Las Vegas, New Mexico, to parents from English and Scottish descent. She studied at the University of Kansas. In 1922 she won the Poetry Prize of the Kansas Author Club.

After moving to the East Coast, she married Liston Oak and became a trade union activist. In 1926 she wrote the titles of the silent film The Passaic Textile Strike. In the thirties she was active as a singer/songwriter and composer of folk songs.

After divorcing her first husband she met writer Albert Maltz in 1935. Maltz was 9 years younger. They married in 1937. Maltz was blacklisted as one of the Hollywood Ten due to his refusal to tell the House Un-American Activities Committee whether he was a member of the American Communist Party.

Larkin, her husband, their son Peter and daughter Katherine moved to Mexico City in 1951. In 1964 they were officially divorced, after Maltz had already returned to the United States.

Larkin assisted anthropologist Oscar Lewis in the research and writing of La vida: a Puerto Rican family in the culture of poverty--San Juan and New York (1966). Her last book was The Hand of Mordechai, on kibbutz Yad Mordechai around the 1947–1949 Palestine war. It was published in Hebrew (1966), Yiddish (1967), English (1968), German (1970), and Russian (197?). The Israeli edition was published by Ma'arachot, the official publishing house of the Israel Defense Forces, with a preface by General Haim Laskov. Larkin was represented by the literary agent Barthold Fles.

Margareth Larkin died in Mexico City on May 7, 1967, aged 67. Her granddaughter born Gabriela Maltz Larkin, is an actress and production manager, more recently known as Mira Larkin.

== Bibliography ==
=== Books ===
- 1926 - El Cristo, a drama in one act
- 1931 - Singing Cowboy, a book of western songs
- 1958 - Seven Shares in a Gold Mine
- 1966 - The Hand of Mordechai (a.k.a. The Six Days of Yad Mordechai)

=== Poetry ===
- 1922 - "Goodbye—To My Mother" in The Poets of the Future, A College Anthology for 1921-1922: 156
- 1924 - "Four Poems", The Midlands 10: 385.

=== Articles ===
- 1927-03 - "A Poet for the People: A Review" (of Langston Hughes: Fine Clothes to the Jew), Opportunity 3: 84-85.
- 1929-10-09 - "Ella May's Songs". The Nation 129 (3353): 382-383.
- 1933-02 - "Revolutionary music", New Masses: 27.
- 1934-09-05 - "Beale Street: Where the Blues Began (Book review)". The Nation 139 (3609): 279.
- 1966-11-14 - "As Many as God Sends? Family Planning in Mexico", The Nation 203 (16): 508-511.

== Filmography ==
- 1926 - The Passaic Textile Strike - title writer

== Awards ==
- 1922 - Best Poem submitted to the Kansas Authors' Club for Goodbye—To My Mother
- 1926 - David Belasco Cup for El Cristo
- 1926 - Samuel French Prize for El Cristo
