= Workers International Relief =

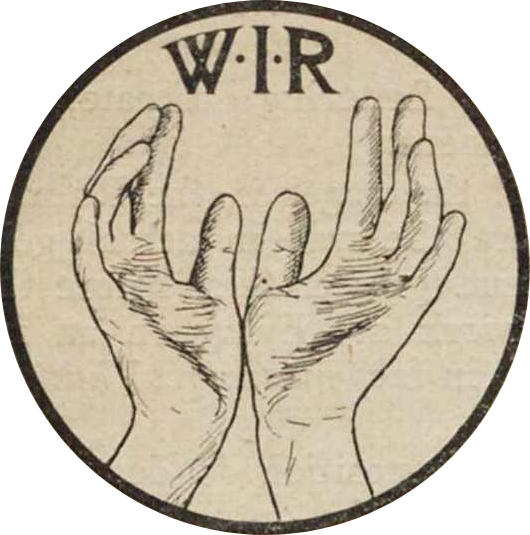
- Logo of the Workers International Relief
- Founded: 1922
- Founder: Comintern
- Dissolved: 1933 (in Nazi Germany); 1935
- Purpose: "Provide a Left-wing counterweight to the generous relief supplies sent to Soviet Russia by the ARA and other bourgeois agencies."
- Region served: Worldwide
- Method: Charity and Taxation
- Key people: Willi Münzenberg

The Workers International Relief (WIR) — also known as Internationale Arbeiter-Hilfe (IAH) in German and as Международная рабочая помощь (Mezhdunarodny Rabochy Komitet Pomoshchi Golodayushchim Rossii − Mezhrabpom) in Russian — was an adjunct of the Communist International initially formed to channel relief from international working class organizations and communist parties to famine-stricken Soviet Russia. The organization, based in Berlin, later produced films and coordinated propaganda efforts on behalf of the USSR.

== Organizational history ==
=== Formation ===
The Internationale Arbeiter-Hilfe (IAH), also known as International Workers' Aid or Workers International Relief (WIR) was created in Berlin on August 12, 1921, in response to a call by Lenin, in order to recruit international support in response to a drought and famine in the Volga area, particularly those lands occupied by the Volga Germans. The drought and reduced crop production in the area was turned into a humanitarian disaster when Bolshevik forces known as "The Iron Broom" began a campaign of massive "tax collections" (food requisitions) to seize food supplies and redistribute them to other parts of Soviet Russia. Lenin's call for international support was motivated by a desire to counteract the influence of Herbert Hoover's American Relief Association (ARA) in providing food aid to the people of the Volga as well as in the rest of Eastern Europe, as Soviet troops were in the process of confiscating food supplies in the Volga region. Lenin regarded the ARA as "mercenaries" who were seeking to defeat Bolshevism by alleviating hunger in Soviet Russia, thus embarrassing the Bolshevist government as ineffective and incompetent. This attitude was echoed by left-leaning commentators and editors in the United States, with the Nation speculating that Hoover might "use his food to overturn the Soviet government."

In the view of Marxist historian E.H. Carr, the original purpose of the WIR was both humanitarian and ideological:

"Its initial function was to provide a Left-wing counterweight to the generous relief supplies sent to Soviet Russia by the ARA and other bourgeois agencies to mitigate the horrors of the famine. German workers undertook to work overtime and set aside their surplus production of machines or consumption goods for Soviet Russia; later, collections of money were made for Soviet workers and a loan was floated; and [Mezhrabpom] began distributing popular literature and propaganda on behalf of Soviet Russia."

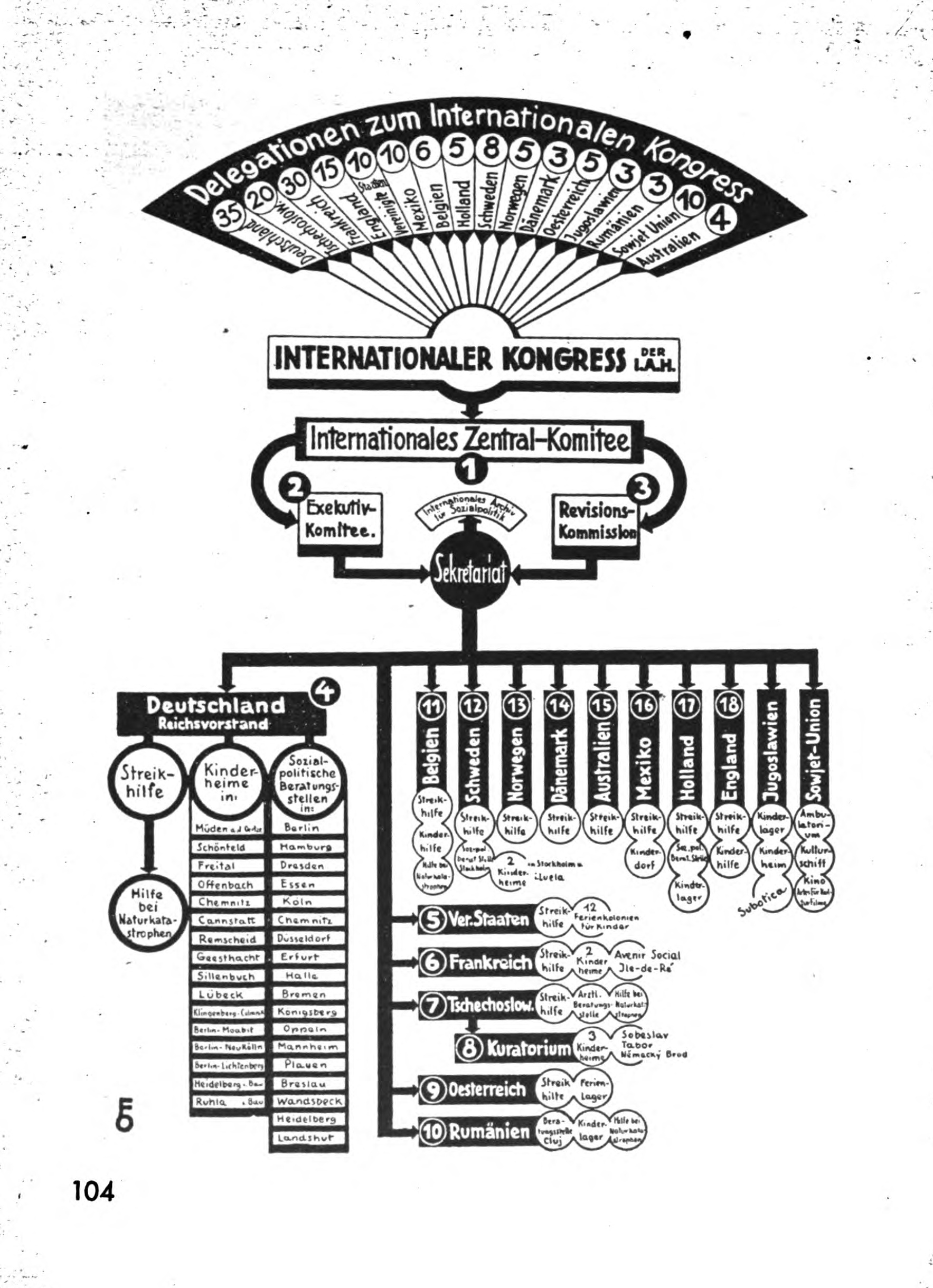
A flowchart published in Der Rote Aufbau depicting the organization of the WIR, July 1929

WIR was formed by Willi Münzenberg, a member of the German Communist Party (KPD) and a skilled propagandist. Münzenberg came to Lenin's attention through his activities as leader of the Young Communist International. With Soviet government funding, Münzenberg promptly set up a series of benignly-titled front organizations such as the Friends of Soviet Russia (FSR). The FSR and similar relief organizations set up by Münzenberg were conceived as a method of raising money from a broad coalition of left-wing groups for famine relief in Soviet Russia while simultaneously concealing the Soviet government's role in organizing such groups (a fact which might have otherwise impeded fundraising efforts). In the FSR, socialist politician and women's rights campaigner Clara Zetkin served as president until her death in 1933.

In subsequent years WIR supported workers in Germany and other countries suffering from the effects of strikes, armed conflict, and natural catastrophes by distribution of clothes, food, and funds by adding an industrial assistance program. Initial funding of WIR was through secret Soviet funding in the form of ten million paper rubles (sovznaki) issued directly from the Soviet Central Bank. Most of WIR's funding assistance was provided through bank credits backed by the Kremlin; other sources included fund drives and tool/technology donations from other countries, from sales of confiscated assets, and from sales of donated foreign equipment such as tractors to private bidders and enterprises inside the Soviet Union.

=== Propaganda efforts ===
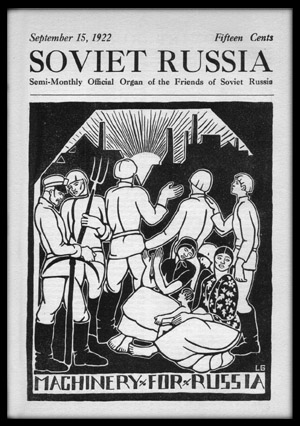
The national sections of WIR, such as the "Friends of Soviet Russia" in the US, provided aid to Soviet Russia and assisted in getting the Soviets' message out to the West.

Münzenberg recognized the potential for cinematic propaganda, and therefore the WIR imported Soviet films as well as producing their own films. In 1922 Münzenberg founded Aufbau Industrie und Handels AG to distribute Soviet films. Hermann Basler led the office for film distribution, which in March 1923 with Polikuschka (director Alexander Sanin, 1922), production of Mezhrabpom-Rus for the first time brought a Soviet film into German cinemas.

As Weimar Republic Germany imposed regulations against the importation of foreign films, the WIR moved in 1924 to Vienna, Austria. WIR at first brought out only one film at its Austrian location however: Kurt Bernhardt's directorial debut Nameless Heroes (1924). Eventually, the Viennese center took over and produced later films like Kuhle Wampe (1931/32). In 1928 the WIR began to produce communist documentary films via the specialized film production company World Film.

The WIR was active in the United States, known for organizing the filming of the Passaic Textile Strike in conjunction with providing strike relief, and being instrumental in the founding of the Workers Film and Photo League.

The WIR was supported by numerous left intellectuals, among them Martin Andersen Nexö, Henri Barbusse, Maxim Gorki, George Grosz, Maximilian Harden, Arthur Holitscher, Käthe Kollwitz, George Bernard Shaw, Upton Sinclair and Ernst Toller.

=== Dissolution ===
After Nazi takeover in 1933 the WIR was severely disrupted.

The Secretariat of the Executive Committee of the Communist International decided to abolish WIR in October 1935, although the decision was not announced publicly. Some of the organization's functions were continued by the International Red Aid.

== National sections ==
- US: Friends of Soviet Russia (later: Friends of the Soviet Union)

== See also ==
- International Red Aid (MOPR), an organization established by the Comintern in 1922 to coordinate material and moral aid to so-called "class war prisoners" around the world
- Communist International
- Workers Film and Photo League
- Photo League
