= Time-and-a-half =

Type of overtime

Time-and-a-half is payment to a worker (or workers) at 1.5 times their usual hourly rate. It is usually paid as an incentive to work on a particular day (such as Saturday) or as government-mandated compensation for having workers work on particular days (such as public holidays).

== New Zealand ==
In New Zealand, if an employee works on a public holiday, the employee gets time-and-a-half for the hours worked and, if the day was an otherwise working day for the employee, an alternative holiday to take at another time.

== United States ==
In the United States, this provision, as well as the minimum wage, was first instituted by the Fair Labor Standards Act. The act was passed in 1938, during the Great Depression. Overtime pay was intended as a penalty or fine upon the employer, not as a bonus to the employee. Hoping to increase employment opportunities, Congress encouraged employers to hire more workers for the same amount of time: it was believed to be better for three workers to work forty hours per week than for two workers to work for sixty hours per week.

== See also ==
- Overtime — double time
