= Hansel Mieth =

American photographer

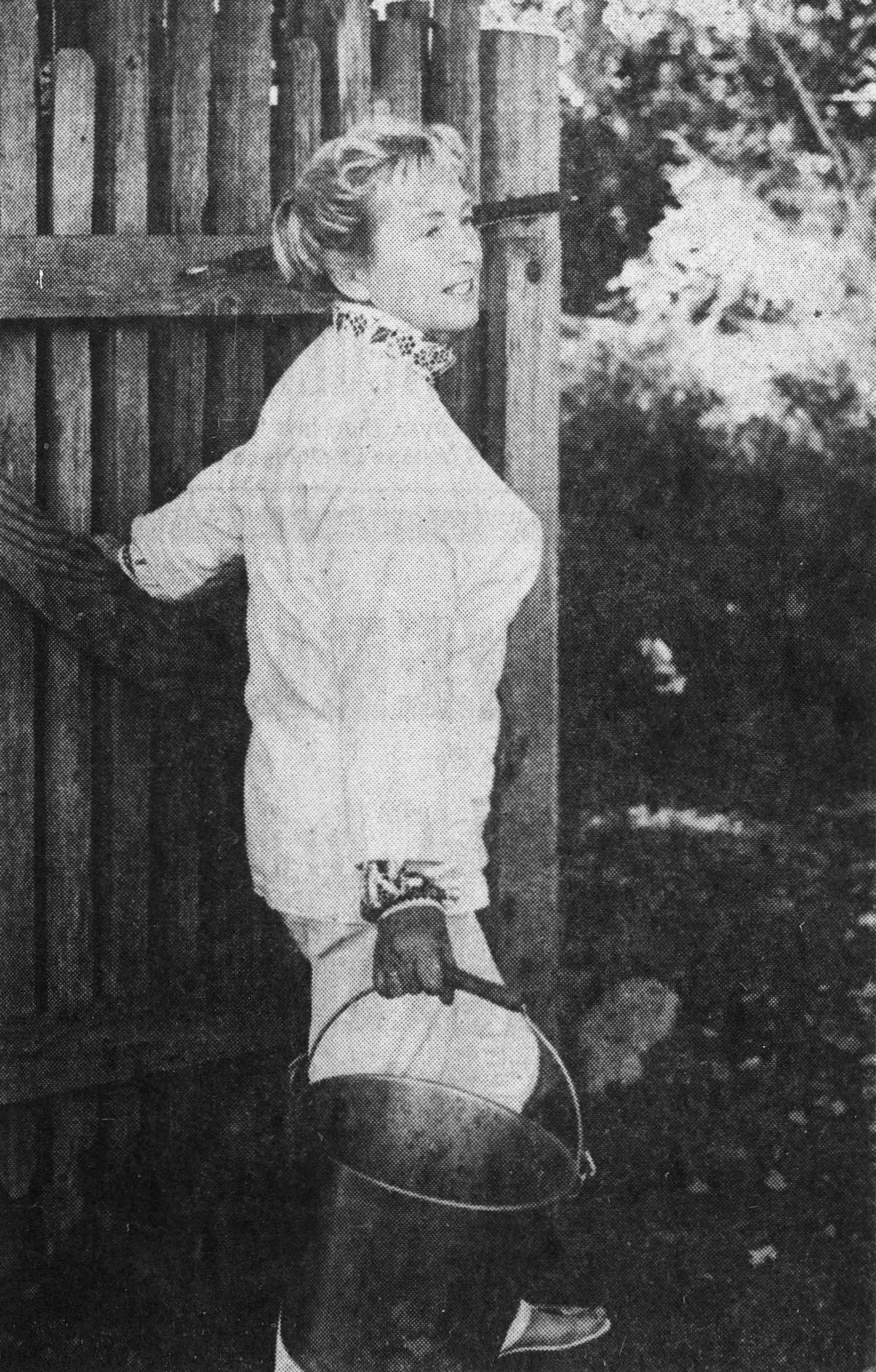
- Mieth in 1968
- Born: Johanna Mieth; April 9, 1909; Berglen, Germany
- Died: February 14, 1998 (aged 88); Santa Rosa, California, United States
- Known for: Photography
- Spouse: Otto Hagel (m. 1940)

Hansel Mieth (1909–1998) was a German-born photojournalist who worked on the staff of LIFE magazine. She was best known for her social commentary photography, which recorded the lives of working class Americans in the 1930s and 1940s.

== Biography ==
She was born Johanna Mieth in Oppelsbohm, Germany, one of three daughters of a strict, religious family. She ran away from home at the age of 15 and did factory work before emigrating to the United States in 1930 to join her lover and fellow photographer Otto Hagel (1909–1973). The couple found themselves in the midst of the Great Depression and worked as migrant farm labourers for several years. During that time they began to photograph the brutal working conditions and suffering they saw around them, after acquiring a second-hand Leica camera. In San Francisco, Sacramento, and in the rural towns they worked in, they photographed the bitter labour strikes and the working homeless. They were involved with the San Francisco Film and Photo League during the early 1930s. They also became acquainted with working photographers and began to sell their own photographs to magazines.

In 1937 Mieth joined the staff of LIFE magazine (only the second woman photographer to do so), and she and Otto (whom she married in 1940), moved to New York. He was then still a German citizen, so in order to escape internment during World War II, the couple fled to a remote ranch near Santa Rosa in northern California. Mieth continued to accept photography assignments for LIFE, while Hagel never left the Singing Hills Ranch.

During World War II, Mieth photographed Japanese Americans who had been removed from their homes and interned by the Roosevelt government. In the early 1950s, the couple's refusal to appear before the House Un-American Activities Committee (where they would have been pressured to reveal the names of their friends in the labor movement) led to Mieth's losing her job at LIFE, and to their being unofficially blacklisted. Shunned by their former friends, the couple retired to their ranch in California, where they raised livestock and where Mieth took up painting.

She died in Santa Rosa, California, in 1998.

== Remembrance ==
Mieth's life story was told in a one-hour documentary titled Hansel Mieth: Vagabond Photographer, directed by Nancy Schiesari, which aired on PBS' Independent Lens series in 2003.

The full archive of Hansel Mieth's work is located at the Center for Creative Photography (CCP) at the University of Arizona in Tucson, which also manages the copyright of her work.

The Hansel Mieth Prize was established to commemorate Hansel Mieth. It is one of the most important honors in German journalism; text and photos are judged equally, in terms of the quality of journalism and social relevance.
