= Sam Brody =

American film director

Sam Brody (January 1, 1907 – September 9, 1987) was an English-born founding member of the Workers Film and Photo League, an independent organization founded in 1931 to produce and present films documenting the Great Depression from a Marxist perspective. He is also known for his work as a photographer and film critic, and for his 15-year relationship with New York City painter Alice Neel.

== Biography ==
Born on January 1, 1907, to Russian Jewish immigrant parents in England, Brody was raised in London, Paris, Richmond, Virginia, and New York City. In 1927 he married artist Claire Gebiner with whom he had two children before the marriage ended in 1941. A son Julian was born in 1930 and a daughter Mady in 1937.

Brody took an early interest in political activism and documentary films. In May 1930 he wrote in The Daily Worker what later became a rallying cry for left-wing filmmakers:

I want once more to emphasize the newsfilm is the important thing; that the capitalist class knows that there are certain things that it cannot afford to have shown. It is afraid of some pictures . ... Films are being used against the workers like police clubs, only more subtly-like the reactionary press. If the capitalist class fears pictures and prevents us from seeing records of events like the March 6 unemployment demonstration and the Sacco-Vanzetti trial we will equip our own cameramen and make our own films.

In 1931 Brody and several others formed the Workers Film and Photo League, variously acting as cameramen, teachers and political theoreticians. In addition to his league activities, he was a regular contributor of film criticism and commentary to various left wing publications, including the Daily Worker and Experimental Cinema.

In 1940 Brody met artist Alice Neel, beginning a complicated, sometimes controversial, on and off affair that ended in 1955. They had one son, Hartley Neel, in 1941. Brody remained friends with Neel until her death in 1984.

In 1955, Brody met and soon married photographer Sondra Herrera. They had one son, David, in 1958. Brody continued to make films and take photographs until his death from a fall on September 9, 1987, at the family home in Old Saybrook, Connecticut.
