= Otto Hagel =

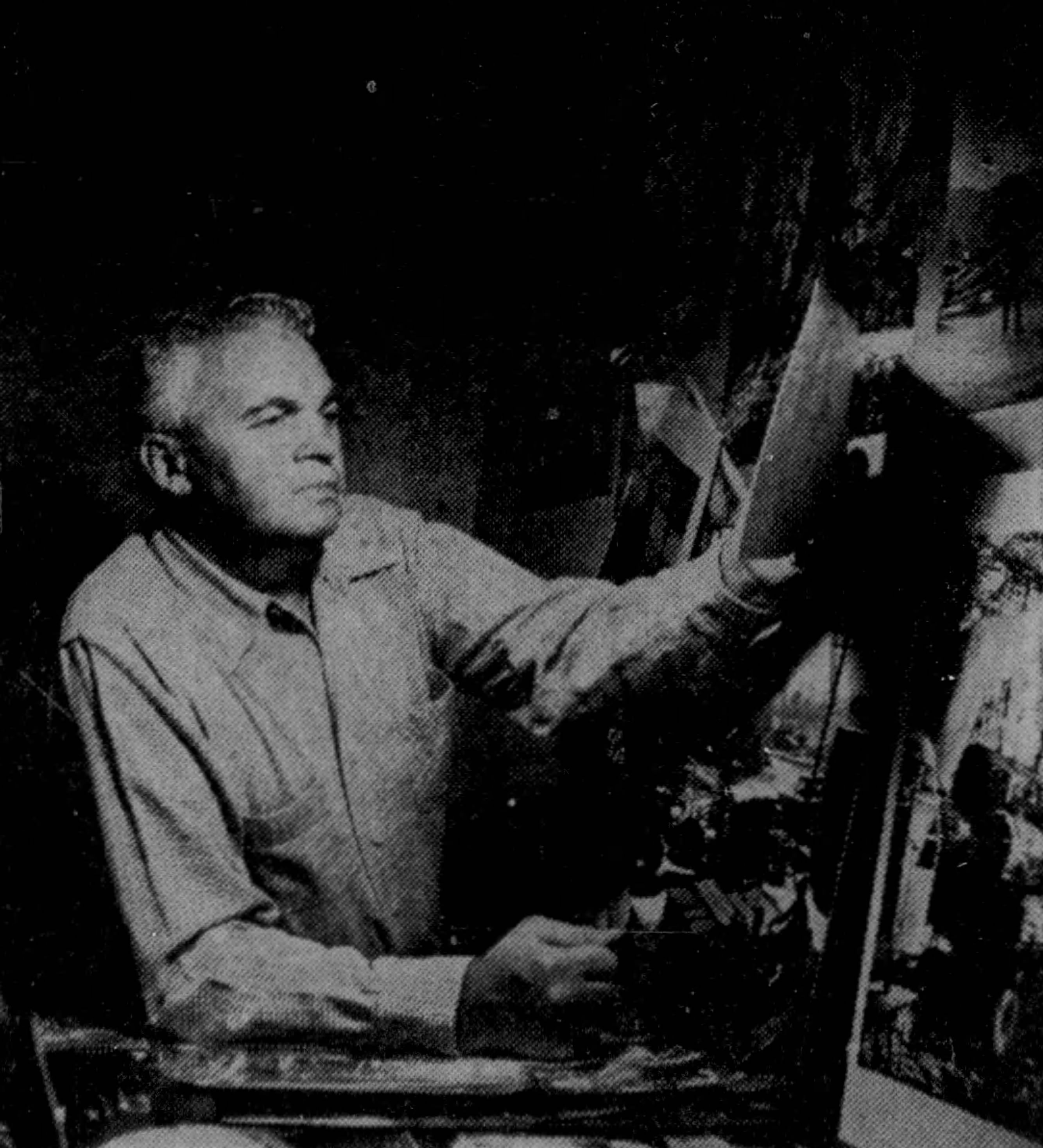
- Hagel in 1956
- Born: March 12, 1909; Fellbach, Kingdom of Württemberg, German Empire
- Died: January 18, 1973 (aged 63); California, United States
- Occupation: photographer
- Spouse: Hansel Mieth

Otto Hagel (March 12, 1909– January 18, 1973) was a German-born American photographer and filmmaker. He and his wife Hansel Mieth were part of the school of socially conscious documentary photo-journalists that included Dorothea Lange, Imogen Cunningham, Peter Stackpole and Robert Capa. In the early 1930s, Hagel was a member of the San Francisco Film and Photo League.

Hagel's photographs of waterfront workers are the basis of two books published by the West Coast ILWU: Men and Ships: A Pictorial of the Maritime Industry (1937); and Men and Machines: A Story About Longshoring on the West Coast Waterfront (1963).

Hagel and Mieth photographed the inside of the Heart Mountain Japanese American internment camp for Life magazine in 1943, but the photographs were not published by Life, In the 1950s, the couple was blacklisted for refusing to testify before the House Un-American Activities Committee.

Hagel and Mieth bought a working ranch in Santa Rosa, California in 1941, and raised chickens for some years. A book with photographs from the period was published, as well as a pictorial in Life called "The Simple Life." During World War II, Hagel, still a German national, was under detention at home.

In 1955 Edward Steichen selected Hagel's high-angle flash-lit photograph, of social scientist Paul Schuster Taylor (husband of Dorothea Lange) conducting a seminar in labor economics, for the world-touring Museum of Modern Art exhibition The Family of Man, seen by 9 million visitors.
