= Albert Weisbord =

American political activist

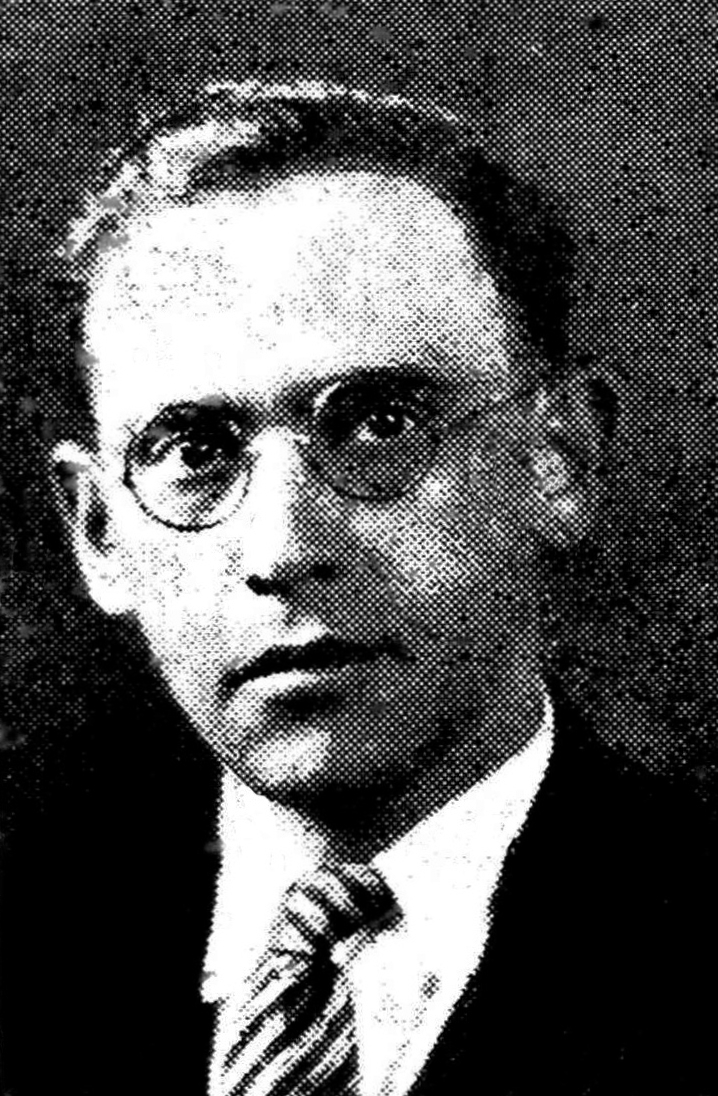
Weisbord c. 1927

Albert Weisbord (December 9, 1900 – April 1977) was an American political activist and union organizer. He is best remembered, along his wife Vera Buch, as one of the primary union organizers of the seminal 1926 Passaic Textile Strike and as the founder of a small Trotskyist political organization of the 1930s called the Communist League of Struggle.

== Biography ==
=== Early years ===
Albert Weisbord was born December 9, 1900, to a Russian-Jewish family in New York City. His father was a manufacturer.

Weisbord attended primary, grammar, and high school in Brooklyn, New York. He worked variously as a newsboy, a clerk in a grocery store, as a worker in a clothing factory, and in a soda shop during his earlier years.

Weisbord entered the City College of New York in 1917, joining the Brooklyn Branch of the Socialist Party of America at that same time. He began teaching classes in the English language to immigrants to America at the Rand School of Social Science, an adult-educational offshoot of the Socialist Party, while he was still himself attending school.

Weisbord graduated with a bachelor's degree from City College Phi Beta Kappa in 1921. He was then accepted into Harvard Law School, graduating with honors in 1924.

=== Political career ===
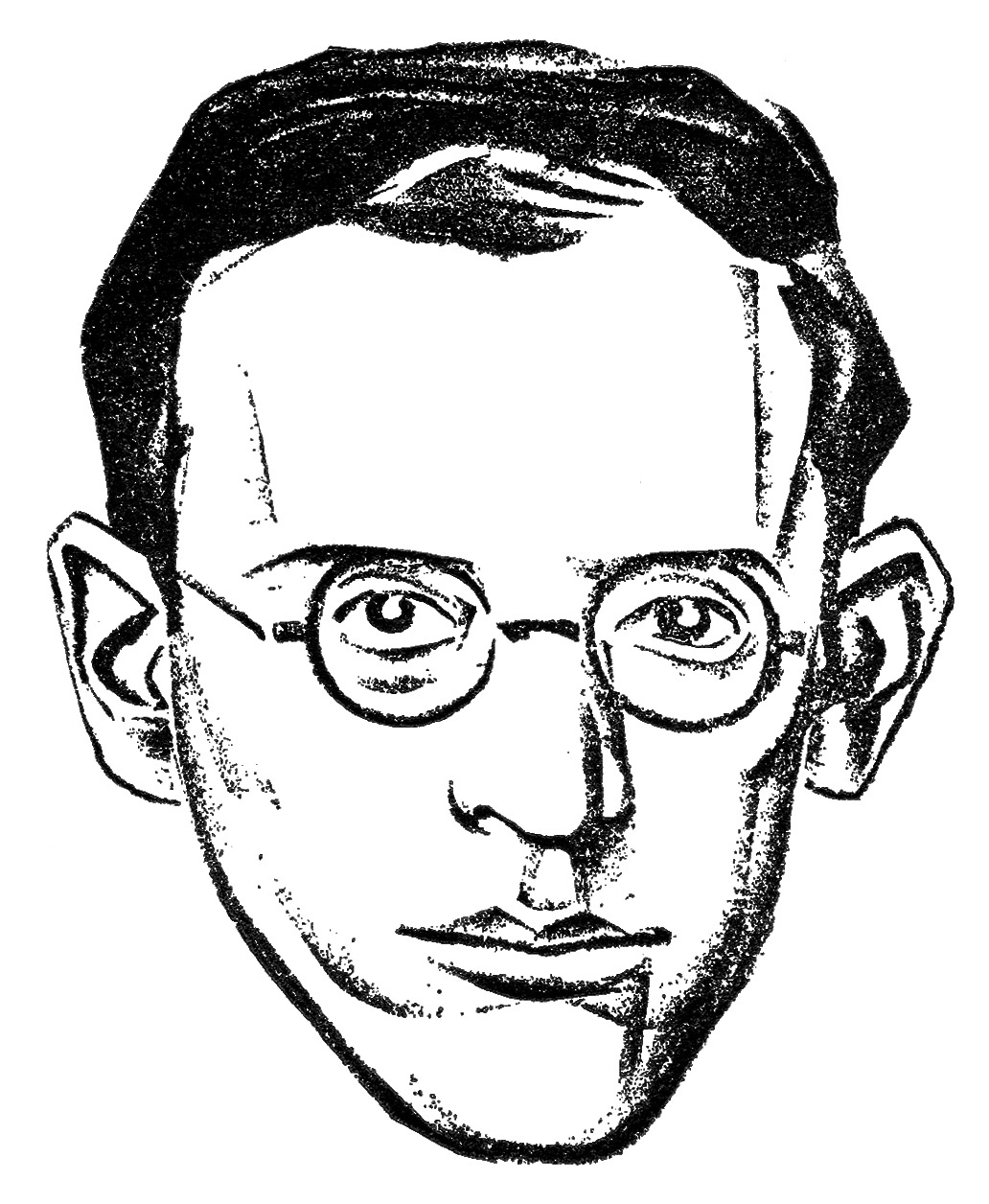
Drawing of Albert Weisbord used in the Communist Press, 1926. Probably drawn by Hugo Gellert.

Weisbord was initially a member of the syndicalist Industrial Workers of the World (IWW), but he soon moved to the ranks of the Socialist Party of America (SPA), an organization which believed in the efficacy of electoral politics to implement change.

In the summer of 1921, the party's National Executive Committee asked him to conduct a speaking tour to help reorganize the Young People's Socialist League, the bulk of which had exited the SPA to join forces with the Communists. After going on tour to reorganize the locals, a national convention was held to relaunch a new YPSL (loyal to the Socialist Party) at Fitchburg, Massachusetts. The convention named Weisbord its National Director, a position which entitled him to a seat on the party's governing NEC. Weisbord remained as National Director of the Socialist Party's youth section until the middle of 1924.

In June 1924, Weisbord was named assistant organizer of the Socialist Party's New England district. Later that year, he attended the meeting of the Conference for Progressive Political Action at which the Socialist Party joined with a number of unions to nominate Robert La Follette as an independent for President of the United States. This experience was disillusioning for Weisbord, as he had wanted the Socialists to form a labor party to guide the workers toward socialist as had been done in England. Instead, he felt that the party was a petty bourgeois organization moving toward liberalism. Weisbord resigned from the SPA joined the Communist (Workers) Party in November 1924.

Leaflet for a speech by Weisbord given in connection with the 10th Anniversary of the Russian Revolution.

While in the Party he gained fame for leading the textile strike in Passaic, New Jersey, in 1926, an event of particular significance as the first attempt by Communists to lead a strike action by American factory workers. The radical Weisbord was seen as an inflammatory figure by the mill owners, and in August 1926 he was removed from leadership of the strikers.

His participation as a leader of the Passaic strike as a leader of the United Textile Workers "made" Weisbord as a public face of the Workers (Communist) Party and upon termination of the strike in the fall of 1926 he was sent on a speaking tour on behalf of the party, telling of his strike experiences to a general audience.

In December 1926, Weisbord was dispatched to Mexico City on behalf of the Red International of Labor Unions (Profintern). He carried with him $1,000 in gold coin as seed money for the Mexican union movement.

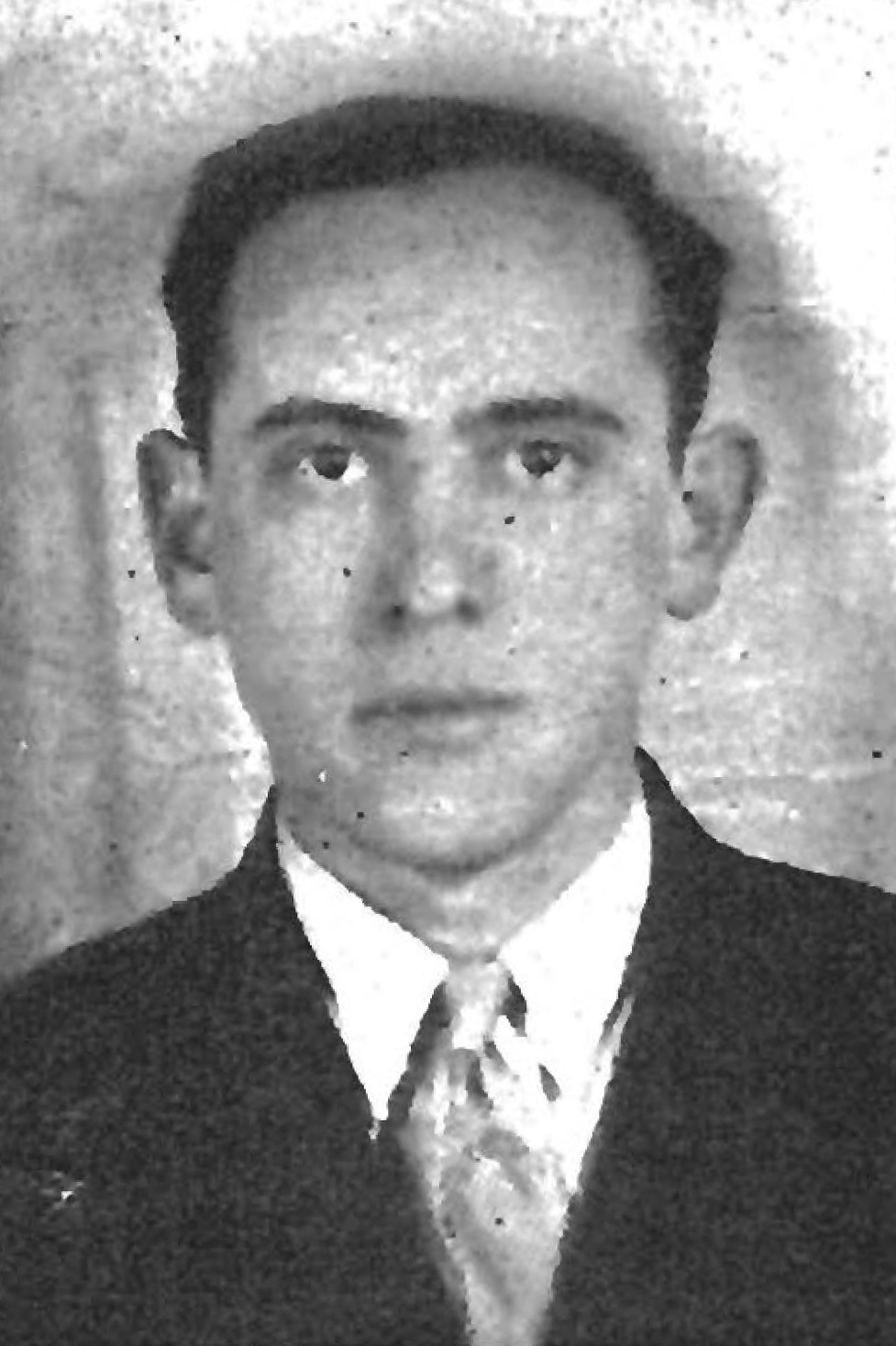
Weisbord c. 1928

Weisbord was sent to Moscow in the spring of 1928 as a delegate of the Communist Party's Trade Union Educational League (TUEL) to the World Congress of the Profintern that opened on March 10, 1928. His selection no doubt was intended in part as a faction-balancing measure, owing to Weisbord's status as one of the top Lovestone loyalists in the Communist Party's labor arm, TUEL being the main center for the opposition faction of William Z. Foster.

In the fall of 1928, Weisbord was the candidate of the Workers (Communist) Party for U.S. Senate from New Jersey. Weisbord also served as the secretary-treasurer of the National Textile Workers' Union, the Communist Party-sponsored dual union affiliated with the Trade Union Unity League.

Following the political demise of Jay Lovestone and his associates in 1929, Weisbord grew increasingly disenchanted with the leadership of the Communist Party. He left the organization and briefly joined the Trotskyist Communist League of America in 1930.

On March 15, 1931, Weisbord and his wife launched an independent Marxist group, the Communist League of Struggle, which existed until 1937.

This was the first split in the US Trotskyist movement. For the first three years the group asserted agreement with the policies of the Trotskyist International Left Opposition and regularly carried Trotskys articles, but in November 1934 Weisbord and the CLS openly broke with Trotsky. By the time the CLS dissolved in 1937 it had almost no membership left, and Weisbord concentrated on publishing his book, The Conquest of Power: Liberalism, Anarchism, Syndicalism, Socialism, Fascism, and Communism which was published by Covici-Friede that year.

=== Death and legacy ===
Albert Weisbord died in April 1977.

== See also ==
- Communist League of Struggle
- 1926 Passaic Textile Strike

== Works ==
=== Books and pamphlets ===
- Passaic: The Story of a Struggle against Starvation Wages and for the Right to Organize. Chicago: Daily World Publishing Co., November 1926.
- For a New Communist International. New York: Communist League of Struggle, 1933.
- Communism and the Social Order. New York : Communist League of Struggle, 1934.
- The Conquest of Power: Liberalism, Anarchism, Syndicalism, Socialism, Fascism, and Communism. New York: Covici-Friede, 1937.
- Latin American actuality New York: Citadel Press, 1964.
- Critique of the New Draft Program of the Communist Party of the Soviet Union. Chicago: E. Clemente & Sons, 1962.

=== Articles ===
- "Support the Central Executive Committee; Criticize Its Too Many Right Errors," The Daily Worker, vol. 5, no. 331 (January 24, 1929), pg. 3.
