= New York State United Teachers =

American labor union for teachers

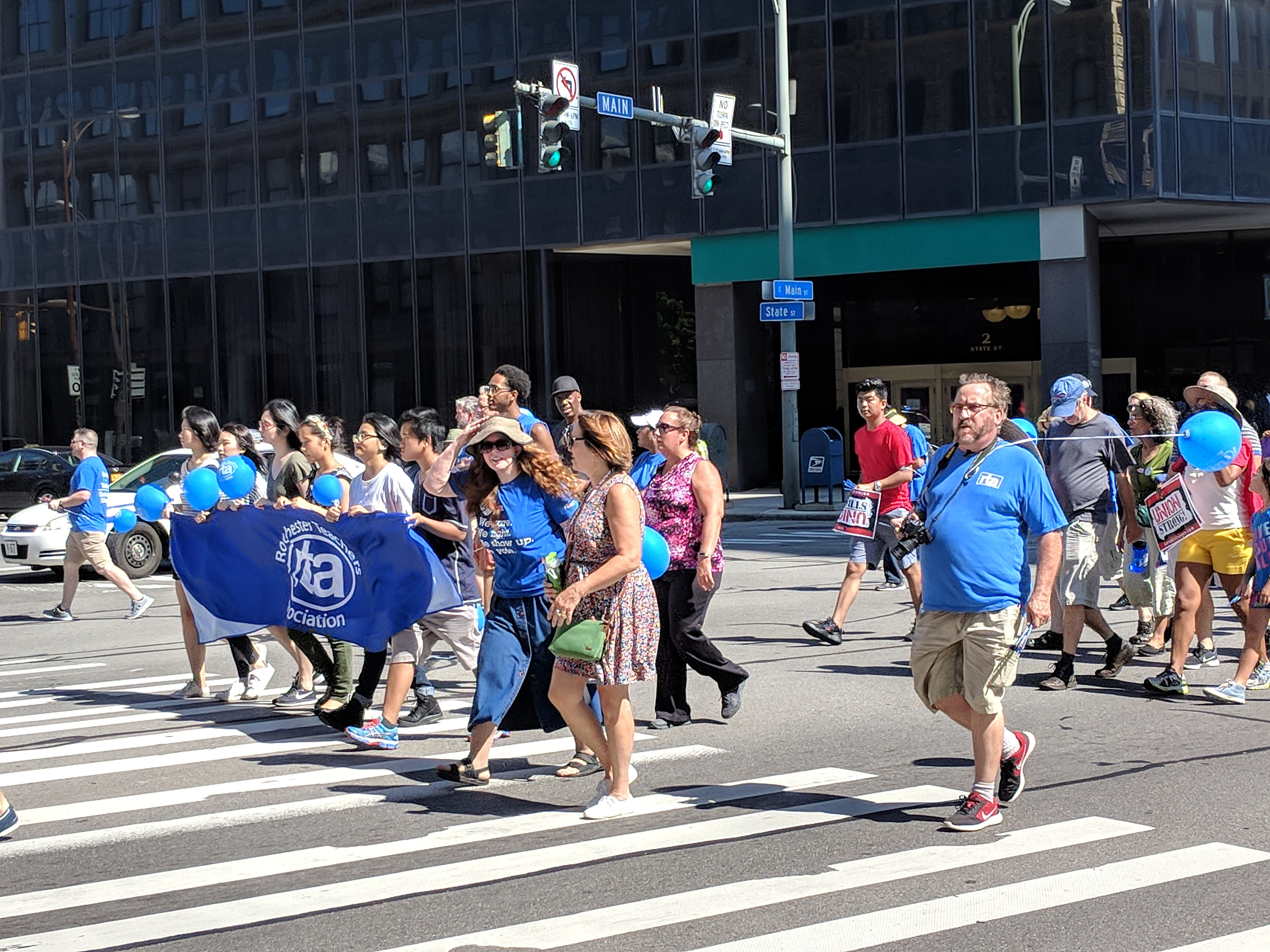
- Rochester Labor Day Parade, 2018
- Founded: March 30, 1972; 54 years ago
- Type: Labor union
- Headquarters: Albany, New York, U.S.
- Location: United States
- Members: 612,297 (2014)
- Key people: Melinda Person, President
- Affiliations: AFT (AFL–CIO), NEA
- Website: nysut.org

New York State United Teachers (NYSUT) is a nearly 700,000-member New York state teachers union, affiliated since 2006 with the American Federation of Teachers (AFT), the AFL–CIO, and the National Education Association (NEA). NYSUT is an umbrella group which provides services to local affiliates in New York state; lobbies on the local, state and federal level; conducts research; and organizes new members.

NYSUT's membership is diverse, representing all five membership categories of the AFT: preK through 12th grade teachers and paraprofessionals in the public and private sector; higher education faculty and paraprofessionals; public employees; private sector libraries; and nurses and other healthcare workers in the public and private sector.

There are more than 900 local affiliates of NYSUT, which range in size from locals of fewer than 10 members to the 140,000-member United Federation of Teachers (UFT) in New York City.

Officers of NYSUT are elected annually by a Representative Assembly (RA). The RA also elects a board of directors, which determines policy between conventions.

== Composition ==
Total membership (US records)
View chart definition.
Finances (US records; ×$1000)
View chart definition.

According to NYSUT's Department of Labor records, about 33%, or a third, of the union's total membership are considered retirees, with eligibility to vote in the union. Other, voting ineligible, classifications include "special constituency" (2%) and "at-large" (1%). This accounts for 203,427 "retiree," 12,663 "special constituency," and 7,731 "at-large" members, compared to 388,476 "in-service" members. Since the 2018 Janus vs. AFSCME non-union members do not pay dues.

== History ==
In 1960, New York City social studies teacher Albert Shanker and Teachers Guild president Charles Cogen led New York City teachers out on strike. At the time, there were more than 106 teacher unions in the New York City public schools, many existing solely on paper, while others, like the Brooklyn Teachers Association, were real unions.

The motives behind the strike were wages, establishment of a grievance process, reduced workloads and more funding for public education. However to win on these issues, Shanker and Cogen argued, the city's teachers had to be in one union. In early 1960 the Teachers Guild merged with a splinter group from the more militant High School Teachers Association to form the United Federation of Teachers (UFT).

The UFT struck on November 7, 1960. More than 5,600 teachers walked the picket line, while another 2,000 engaged in a sick-out. It was a fraction of the city's 45,000 teachers. However, intervention by national, state and local AFL–CIO leaders pressured New York City mayor Robert Wagner to appoint a pro-labor fact-finding committee to investigate conditions in the city's schools and recommend a solution to the labor problem.

The fact-finding committee recommended a collective bargaining law, which eventually was forced onto the city's Board of Education by the state of New York. Despite a battle royale with the National Education Association (NEA), an infusion of cash by the AFT and the AFL–CIO enabled the UFT to win the December 16, 1961, election with 61.8 percent of the votes.

In 1967, the New York state legislature passed the Taylor Law, which provided collective bargaining rights to public employees. Both the NEA and AFT began rapidly organizing new members.

The NEA's state operation, the New York State Teachers Association (NYSTA), had been dominated by administrators until 1965, when they were excluded from membership.

The AFT's state affiliate, the Empire State Federation of Teachers, was very small. Shanker urged changes on the AFT state affiliate. The organization was renamed the New York State Federation of Teachers in the 1960s and the United Teachers of New York (UTNY) in 1971. That same year, Shanker was elected president of UTNY.

In 1971, the New York State legislature, under "messages of necessity" from Governor Nelson Rockefeller, enacted five "anti-teacher" laws. One extended the probationary period for new teachers from three to five years.

Shortly after, the executive director and other staff members of NYSTA began to meet with Shanker and his aides to discuss the possibility of a merger. Each union had spent large amounts of money battling the other for bargaining rights and members while the state legislature and local school districts steadily chipped away at union rights and collective bargaining agreements.

In 1971, Shanker and newly elected NYSTA president Thomas Hobart entered into formal merger negotiations. The merger agreement was signed March 30, 1972. Hobart was elected president and Shanker executive vice president. Other offices included Dan Sanders, first vice president; Antonia Cortese, second vice president; and Ed Rodgers, secretary-treasurer.

NYSUT and UTNY had sought and won approval for the merger from both parent unions, but tensions with the NEA quickly became apparent. Hobart and Shanker began promoting a merger between the NEA and AFT at NEA meetings, an effort that met with a hostile response. NEA leadership began to isolate NYSUT officers and delegates at conventions and other meetings. The NEA staff, working through the UniServ system (which provides services to NEA local unions), began to actively turn other state and local NEA members against the merged union.

In 1976, the NEA undertook an 'image enhancement' campaign in New York state. NYSUT officials saw this as a propaganda effort designed to undermine the merged union.

At the NYSUT convention in New York City that same year, delegates argued over the merits of the disaffiliation resolution. Shanker then delivered a powerhouse speech that galvanized the delegates. The delegates responded by passing a resolution that disaffiliated NYSUT from NEA.

Shanker and Hobart had, however, ignored a key provision in the merger agreement approved by both NEA and AFT. It stated that disaffiliation from either national group, within a five-year period of the 1972 merger, would obligate NYSUT to pay "liquidated damages" to the national organization from which NYSUT disaffiliated. NYSUT was ultimately required to pay NEA a multi-million dollar settlement.

NEA responded to the disaffiliation move by setting up a rival state organization, the New York Educators Association (NYEA). The NEA believed that many NYSUT locals, with at least 50,000 members, would leave the organization. While many locals disaffiliated from the NYSUT, a few soon rejoined. Over the next quarter-century, NYEA's membership stagnated, while NYSUT's exploded thanks to its leaders' decision to recruit members outside the field of education.

NYSUT's membership had, in fact, been diversified from the outset. The union welcomed paraprofessionals and other school-related personnel—including bus drivers, custodians, cafeteria workers, and others. It also affiliated several independent unions of higher education faculty. In 1979, the union began organizing registered nurses and other health care professionals in both public and private sector hospitals and clinics.

Shanker was elected president of the national AFT in 1974 but continued to hold his position in NYSUT until 1984. Shanker was elected to the executive council of the AFL–CIO in 1974 as well. His election represented the first time the AFT had a seat on the council. When, however, he voted against enhanced education funding in favor of Cold War measures (like the B-1 bomber), Shanker insisted that he was elected by all the members of the AFL–CIO convention and obliged, therefore, to vote against teachers when approval of defense appropriations was at issue.

Shanker died in 1997. Hobart retired as president of NYSUT in April 2005. He was succeeded by Richard Ianuzzi, NYSUT second vice president and a member of NYSUT's board of directors. In April 2014, Karen Magee was elected NYSUT president.

== Political activity ==
Politically, 1973 was a pivotal year for NYSUT. The union adopted UTNY's Committee of 100 program, a group of many more than 100 members who agreed to lobby the state legislature in person twice each year. In 1967 NYSUT had created its own political action committee, VOTE-COPE, which was also melded into NYSUT. In 2005, the Committee of 100 counted several thousand members and VOTE-COPE raised more than $3 million in voluntary contributions.

Over the years, NYSUT's political activism has led it to be characterized as 'the 800-pound gorilla of New York politics.' Some of the union's accomplishments include:

- In 1975, passage of a law guaranteeing tenure transfer rights and a maximum two-year probation period for teachers who switched districts;
- In 1976, a legislative override of a veto of a bill requiring a formula for average funding of New York City public schools (it was the first override of a governor's veto in 104 years);
- In 1977, a law providing for significantly enhanced enforcement powers for the state Public Employment Relations Board; and
- In 1978, repeal of the Taylor Law's mandatory penalty of one year's probation for any public employee who went on strike.

NYSUT continued to expand collective bargaining rights for teachers as well. In 1981, the union won passage of a law granting collective bargaining rights for substitute teachers. In 1982, the state legislature passed the Triborough Amendment to the Taylor Law. Many school districts ceased to honor clauses they disliked in expired teacher union contracts, which led many locals to strike. The Triborough Amendment required school districts to honor the entire contract until a new agreement was reached, and the number of strikes fell drastically.

Professional development also became a concern. In 1984, NYSUT successfully pushed for passage of a state law creating and funding centers where teachers could obtain continuing education. In 1986, the union won passage of a bill creating mandatory mentor-intern programs in schools, so that established teachers would be able to mentor student-teachers during their internships in the public schools.

Retirement issues also came to the fore. NYSUT established a retiree division in 1976. In 1985, the state legislature passed a bill providing for full retirement benefits for any teacher aged 55 who had taught for at least 30 years. A year later, the union won passage of a bill giving school paraprofessionals a full year's retirement credit (12 months) for working a full 10-month school year.

For the 2012 New York's 18th congressional district the NYSUT endorsed Democrat Sean Patrick Maloney.

== 2006 merger with NEA ==
On May 5, 2006, NYSUT voted to merge with the NEA/NY, the renamed NYEA. The 35,000-member NYEA had approved the merger agreement on April 29, 2006. The merger became effective on September 1, 2006, and the newly merged union is now jointly affiliated with both the NEA and AFT.

The AFT has long sought merger with the NEA on a national level. But acrimonious relationships between the two unions on the local level and AFT's insistence on what NEA and its affiliates consider undemocratic practices and AFT's insistence upon affiliation with the AFL–CIO are significant obstacles. Among AFT's "undemocratic" practices are its abolition of the secret ballot, its requirement that delegates to its convention vote for officers by roll-call ballot, identifying their choices and their names in writing.

The two unions have continued to work together, however. After the failed merger attempt, the unions formed the 'NEAFT Partnership' to encourage joint policies on education, federal funding for public schools, and lobbying. The unions also agreed to support local- and state-level mergers where appropriate.

Three other states have merged AFT-NEA affiliates: Florida, Minnesota and Montana. Among local mergers is that in Wichita, Kansas, long a battleground for the two national unions, and Los Angeles. Combined, the merged units represent 197,000 members. The NEA has 2.7 million members, the AFT 1.7 million.

With the NYSUT merger, 681,000 members of the AFT (or about 52 percent) now belong to NEA.

== Presidents ==
1. Thomas Hobart (1972–2005)
2. Richard Iannuzzi (2005–2014)
3. Karen McGee (2014–2017)
4. Andrew Pallotta (2017–2023)
5. Melinda Person (2023–present)

== See also ==
- New York City Teachers Union (1916–1964)
