= David Selden =

American educational activist (1914–1998)

David Selden (June 5, 1914 – May 8, 1998) was an American activist who led the American Federation of Teachers from 1968 through 1974.

As Director of Organization of the Teachers Guild from 1953, he was a main strategist in the creation of the United Federation of Teachers in 1960 and the winning of collective bargaining in 1961. During that time he mentored several UFT staff people, including Burke Probitsky and Robert Lieberman and elected leaders. Among them was one he was particularly close to: a junior high school teacher named Albert Shanker. Shanker often paid tribute to Selden, saying that all he knew about union organizing he had learned from Selden.

Selden left UFT in 1968 upon winning election as president of the American Federation of Teachers. (In AFT, unlike its rival, the National Education Association, staff members are eligible to run for elective office. Most UFT, AFT, and other large AFT affiliates are headed by former staff people.) With the merger of the AFT and NEA affiliates in New York State in 1972, AFT became a major national union.

Selden's new prominence as head of a major union, and his opposition to the Vietnam War, landed him on the master list of Nixon political opponents.

The New York merger also meant that AFT had grown large enough for George Meany, president of the AFL-CIO, to judge that the teachers' union deserved a seat on the Big Labor's all-powerful executive council. AFL-CIO rules then required a council member to hold "a unique constitutional office" in his own union. In the AFT only the president and the secretary-treasurer held such offices.

Shanker, now head of AFT's New York City local, the United Federation of Teachers, was one of two dozen AFT vice presidents; he held, that is, a constitutionally non-unique position. But he wanted that AFL-CIO Council seat; and Meany, a hawk on Vietnam who had denied the dovish George McGovern labor's endorsement two years earlier, would not give the seat to the equally dovish Selden. Shanker, equally a hawk, had the AFT executive council create the position of "executive vice president" and elect him, Shanker, to the position. Though the AFT constitution said nothing about an executive vice president, Meany wanted Shanker and Meany persuaded the AFL-CIO Council to add Shanker to its ranks.

Sensitive to criticism of the two power plays—Meany's and his own—Shanker challenged his erstwhile friend and mentor Selden for the AFT presidency in 1974. He lined up nearly all the other AFT vice presidents in support of his candidacy. At the AFT's annual convention that year, in Toronto, Shanker buried Selden, winning almost 80 percent of the delegates' votes.

Selden retreated to Michigan where he remained active for several years in various union posts, including a spell as executive director of a local American Association of University Professors chapter.

He died in Kalamazoo, Michigan, of heart failure, a complication of a stroke he suffered two years prior.

Non-profit organization positions
Preceded by Charles Cogen	President, American Federation of Teachers; 1968 - 1974	Succeeded by Albert Shanker
