= Bella Dodd =

American anti-communist, formerly teacher and labor union leader

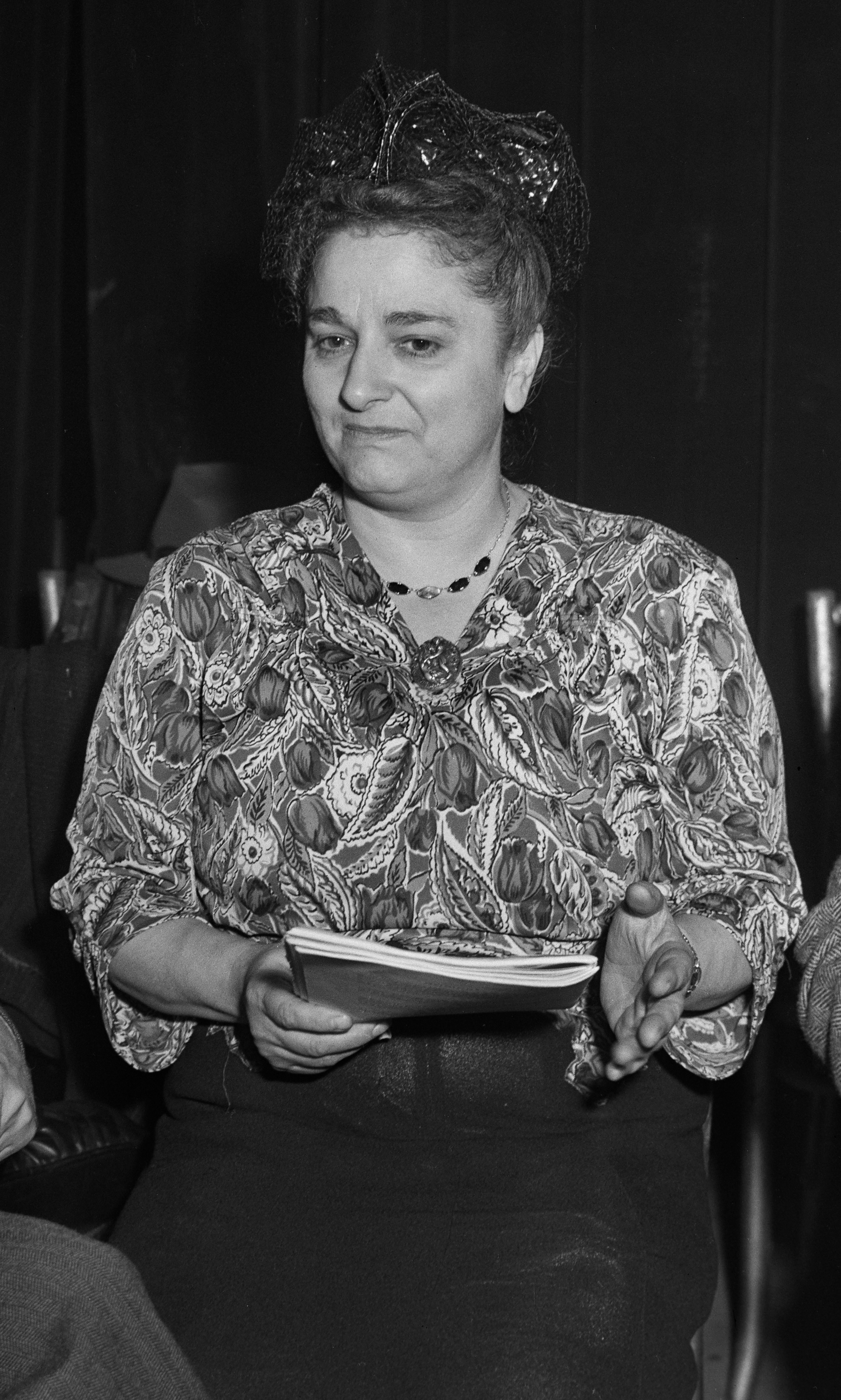
- Dodd in 1944
- Born: Maria Assunta Isabella Visono; 1904; Picerno, Basilicata, Kingdom of Italy
- Died: April 29, 1969 (aged 64–65); New York City, U.S.
- Citizenship: American
- Education: Hunter College, Columbia University, New York University
- Occupations: Teacher, lawyer, labor union activist
- Years active: 1925–1969
- Employer(s): Hunter College, Teachers Union, Communist Party USA
- Known for: Earlier Communism, turning into Anti-communism
- Spouse: John Dodd (divorced)

Bella Dodd (née Visono; 1904 – April 29, 1969) was a teacher, lawyer, and labor union activist, member of the Communist Party of the United States of America (CPUSA) and New York City Teachers Union (TU) in the 1930s and 1940s ("one of Communism's most strident voices"). She became a vocal anti-communist after she underwent a major conversion upon meeting Fulton J. Sheen, Bishop of Rochester, New York.

== Background ==
Bella Dodd was born Maria Assunta Isabella Visono in 1904 in Picerno, Basilicata region, Province of Potenza, Kingdom of Italy, the youngest of ten children. When her family came to the United States, they were very poor, and stopped going to church. She attended public schools in the New York City area including Evander Childs High School. In 1921, after winning a state scholarship, she attended Hunter College, a public university. She worked summers and received an A.B. in 1925, developing an interest in social issues and drifting into agnosticism. In her senior year, she became president of the student council. She received an MA from Columbia University, writing a thesis entitled "Is Congress a Mirror of the Nation?" She switched to the legal division from Fall 1927 to June 1930, and received a JD from the School of Law at New York University.

In summer 1930 she traveled through Europe; she found Italian Fascism appalling and became vehemently anti-fascist. Dodd met her future husband John Dodd during this trip, and they married in late September. In 1940, her husband left her over political differences. They had no children.

== Career ==
In fall 1925, Dodd got her first job as a substitute teacher of history at Seward Park High School. In February 1926, she began teaching at Hunter College, which she continued even after passing the New York bar exam in 1931.

On route home from Europe in 1930, Dodd met a group of New York City school teachers in the Teachers Union. She started attending union meetings, but she "found them disconcerting because there was so much strife between groups seeking control." She took off time from work after her marriage, but returned to Hunter College by 1932 when the Great Depression affected both her parents and husband. From 1926 to 1938, Dodd taught political science and economics at Hunter College. In 1938, she resigned to become a full-time activist for the New York City Teachers Union (TU).

Dodd joined an "Anti-Fascist Literature Committee." She was attracted to the Communist Party by Margaret Schlauch: "The Communist Party in this country set itself up as the one organization that was fighting fascism." Harriet Silverman introduced her to U.S. Communist Party leader Earl Browder. Teachers urged her to attend a "Class Room Teachers Association," through which she learned of the Trade Union Unity League (TUUL) and the Teachers Union (TU). She saw Celia Lewis, Clara Richer, and Max Diamond emerge as leaders of the TU's "Red minority." A first bill she helped pass led to her promotion as a TU legislative representative, for which she took a six-month leave of absence from Hunter College in Spring 1936, taking over from TU co-founder Abraham Lefkowitz. (Charles J. Hendley was TU president 1935–1945.) Party leaders like Jack Stachel and William Z. Foster demanded that American workers become "politicalized" and "proletarianized." Through the intervention of friend and mayor Fiorello LaGuardia, Dodd got leave again. During the Spanish Civil War (1936–1939), teachers volunteered for the Lincoln Brigade: Dodd names Sid Babsky and Ralph Wardlaw. TU membership rose above 9,000, with a tenth communists. So many college teachers joined that they formed their own New York City College Teachers Union Local 537 AFT. Dorothy Wallace joined the TU as "minder" for the Soviets, under her brother, vice president Dale Zysman (Party name "Jack Hardy") who had trained in Moscow. Henry Linville and Abraham Lefkowitz split from the TU to form the New York City Teacher Guild.

By 1938, Dodd resigned from Hunter College and took a full-time position in the pro-communist TU, and moved her family to Poughkeepsie to ease access to state legislators in Albany. In 1939, the Hitler-Stalin Pact undermined the TU's public position, and the Rapp-Coudert Committee started its anti-communist investigations, subpoenaing more than 600 teachers suspected of Pro-Soviet sympathies. Dodd secretly burned a list of TU members in her possession. By 1940, opposition to the TU had gathered: Linville and Lefkowitz rallied George Googe and other anti-communists from the American Federation of Teachers (AFT), the American Federation of Labor (AFL), and individuals including George Counts and John Childs of Teachers College, George Axtelle, Lovestoneites led by Ben Davidson, and teachers from Detroit, Atlanta, and Washington. The Party formed a "Committee to Defend the Public Schools" and Dodd headed a "Women's Trade Union Committee for Peace."

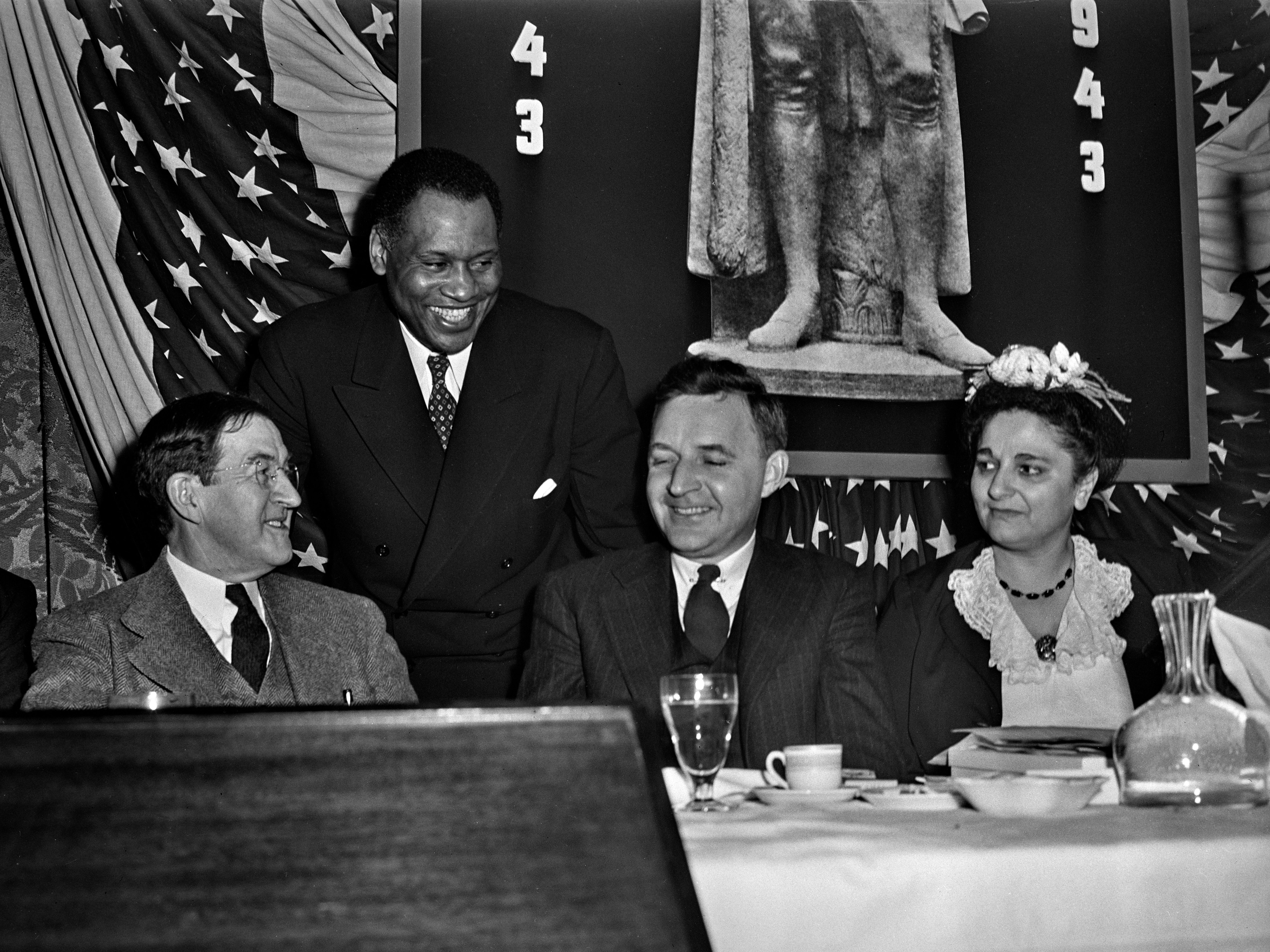
Dodd (far right) at a Teachers Union luncheon at the Commodore Hotel in New York City, April 17, 1943 Left to right: Charles J. Hendley, Paul Robeson, Julius Emspak, Bella Dodd.

By that time, Dodd worked for NY Teachers' Union (TU) and the American Labor Party, but also secretly for the Communist Party. City College of New York expelled 50 teachers, including Morris U. Schappes. Dodd spent 1940–1941 defending teachers or finding them new jobs. She also led the TU into new affiliation with United Public Workers as Local 555 UPW. In 1942, she found herself deep in political infighting between communists and the anti-Stalinist Left over control the American Labor Party. In 1944, she oversaw the opening of the Jefferson School of Social Science, successor to the New York Workers School, orchestrated by Earl Browder and Alexander Trachtenberg. She declined an offer to run the California Labor School.

During her time with the TU, Dodd worked closely with the Communist Party, but she was not an open member. As she testified before HUAC in 1953, "the Communist Party was emphatic that professional people engaged in public service who had public jobs were not to be exposed and were not card-carrying members. Rather, she served in the faction that moved the TU "in the direction of the Communist Party." By 1943, Dodd's feelings toward the Communist Party had changed:

During the war period I saw how opportunism and selfishness engulfed many [Party] comrades. They wore expensive clothes, lived in fine apartments, took long vacations at places provided by men of wealth.... There were the trade union Communists who rubbed elbows with underworld characters at communist-financed night clubs, and labor lawyers who were given patronage by the Party...and now were well established and comfortable.

In March 1943, Gil Green convinced Dodd to become an open Communist Party leader. Dodd succeeded Si Gerson (who was enlisting in the Army) as Communist legislative representative for the New York district, retaining an honorary TU position. At Party headquarters, she attended Politburo meetings with Gil Green, Earl Browder, William Z. Foster, Robert Minor, Jim Ford, Jack Stachel, John Williamson, and Elizabeth Gurley Flynn. Dodd, Philip Jones, and Allen Goodwin set up a law office at 25 West 43rd Street for political outreach beyond the Party, including with the National Maritime Union.

In 1944, Dodd served on the National Committee of the Communist Party, on the secretariat of the New York State Communist Party along with Si Gerson and Israel Amter, and the National Committee of the "Communist Political Association."

She later wrote:

By January 1944 I was firmly established at Party headquarters on Twelfth Street. There I organized the legislative program of the Party; but, more important still, I supervised the legislative work of the unions, chiefly the unions of government workers on a state, local, and national level, of the mass organizations of women, and of 'the youth organizations.

Dodd wrote that the Party had control of the CIO Political Action Committee as well as the Independent Committee of Artists, Scientists and Professionals, chaired by sculptor Jo Davidson. Depressed by continued infighting, Dodd complained to Gurley Flynn, who sent Dodd on a cross-country speaking tour in 1945, but upon her return to New York she found no improvement.

By April 1945, the US Communist Party leader Browder, who had suppressed orders from Moscow to radically change the Party's platform from that of the wartime alliance and to instead vocally attack the United States as a Fascist police state. When Moscow informed the Party of their wishes, Browder was vocally opposed by Mother Bloor, Gurley Flynn, Ann Burlak, Benjamin J. Davis Jr., and Pat Tuohy. Dodd began angling to leave the Party but was refused. In January 1946, Browder and all those suspected of "Browderism" were expelled from the Party; Dodd claimed "several thousands were expelled". These included writer Ruth McKenney and husband Bruce Minton.

Dodd began to come under government suspicion. She told the New York County district attorney's office she had become a Communist "because only the Communists seemed to care about what was happening to people in 1932 and 1933.... They were fighting hunger and misery and fascism then; and neither the major political parties nor the churches seemed to care." In Spring 1947, after Foster traveled to Europe for consultations with Moscow, the Party replaced the Daily Worker editor Morris Childs with John Gates, with Dodd abstaining from the vote. Foster announced plans for a new Progressive Party, and in January 1948, "before Henry Wallace had made any public statement, in fact even before the Progressive Party had been formally organized, Foster announced through the Associated Press that it was going to be formed and that Henry Wallace would be its standard bearer."

By late 1947, Dodd became convinced of her pending Party expulsion for Browderism, and focused on her law work. On June 17, 1949, she heard from the Associated Press: "We have received a statement from the Communist Party announcing your expulsion from membership. It says here that you are anti-Negro, anti-Puerto Rican, anti-Semitic, anti-labor, and the defender of a landlord." Officially, Dodd was expelled for representing a landlord in a legal dispute with a renter, violating Party bylaws against defense of private property.

== Post-Communist career ==
=== Catholicism ===
On April 8, 1952, Dodd rejoined the Roman Catholic Church at Saint Patrick's Cathedral, New York City, after taking weekly instruction from Monsignor Fulton J. Sheen (whose converts also included Louis F. Budenz and Clare Booth Luce). She became an outspoken proponent for the Catholic Church and a vocal anti-communist, warning against the "materialistic philosophy" which guided public education and demoralized Americans, as well as formed the basis of both Communism and National Socialism.

=== Congressional Testimony ===
On March 10, 1953, Dodd testified before a televised hearing of the U.S. Senate Internal Security Subcommittee (SISS) about covert Party infiltration of labor unions and other institutions. The following day, The New York Times front page stated: "Bella Dodd Asserts Reds Got Presidential Advisory Posts." Dodd had testified that "Communists had got into many legislative offices of Congress and into a number of groups advising the President of the United States," as well as the State of New York's Office of Education in Albany and New York City's Board of Education, and the Party had "read the minds" of some thousand school and college teachers in New York. It had been very easy for her to inject communist beliefs into her teaching: this was the "function of a Communist teacher...to create people willing to accept a Communist government." The only way to root out communism among teachers would be by "a Federal investigating group with subpoena power."

On June 17–18, 1953, Dodd testified before the U.S. House Un-American Activities Committee (HUAC), under the questioning of HUAC lead counsel Robert Lowe Kunzig. She claimed to have resigned her Party position in 1946 and returned to law. However, in her memoir, she reports that she continued to use her position as a lawyer to continue Party work until her expulsion in 1949. She testified that she knew J. Peters.

She explained:

- "The Communist Party in this country set itself up as the one organization that was fighting fascism."
- "I went in the Teachers' Union and I received $60 a week... When I went to serve as the legislative representative of the Communist Party, I received $50 a week... We weren't doing it for pay. We were doing it because we really believe in it."
- Her dedication to Communism arose from nascent Browderism: "After the Tehran Conference and Yalta Conference, we were told the United States and the Soviet Union were going forward to a hundred years of peace."
- American communists can justify overthrowing their government because "They (the Party) divide your loyalty to the 'country' from loyalty to the 'people.'"
- When she tried to leave the Party in 1946, New York party secretary Bill Norman told her "Nobody gets out of the Party. We throw you out, but you don't get out by yourself." She was warned that leaving the Party would descend into becoming a "stool pigeon." She remarked, "That is a hard word to live with. It is a hard word to live with."

She encouraged others to testify.

She claimed that more than 1,500 teachers nationwide were members of the Communist Party, and that the Party recruited teachers and professionals, but kept their participation highly secret. However, "99.99% [of American teachers] are loyal Americans." In the party, she said, there was no academic freedom, "no room for difference of opinion."

== Later life ==
Dodd continued to work as a lawyer for the rest of her life.

In 1968, she made an unsuccessful run for a seat in the US Congress as the candidate of the New York Conservative Party. She came in last place with 3% of the vote, against Democratic incumbent Leonard Farbstein.

Dodd died in Manhattan on April 29, 1969, at age 64 after gall bladder surgery. She was buried at Gate of Heaven Cemetery in Pleasantville, New York.

== Works ==
- Dodd, Bella (1954). School of Darkness. New York: P.J. Kennedy & Sons.

== See also ==
- Marie Carré
- Elizabeth Bentley
- Sylvia Callen
- Louis F. Budenz
- Charles J. Hendley
- Dale Zysman
