= Charles J. Hendley =

American labor union leader and teacher

Charles James Hendley
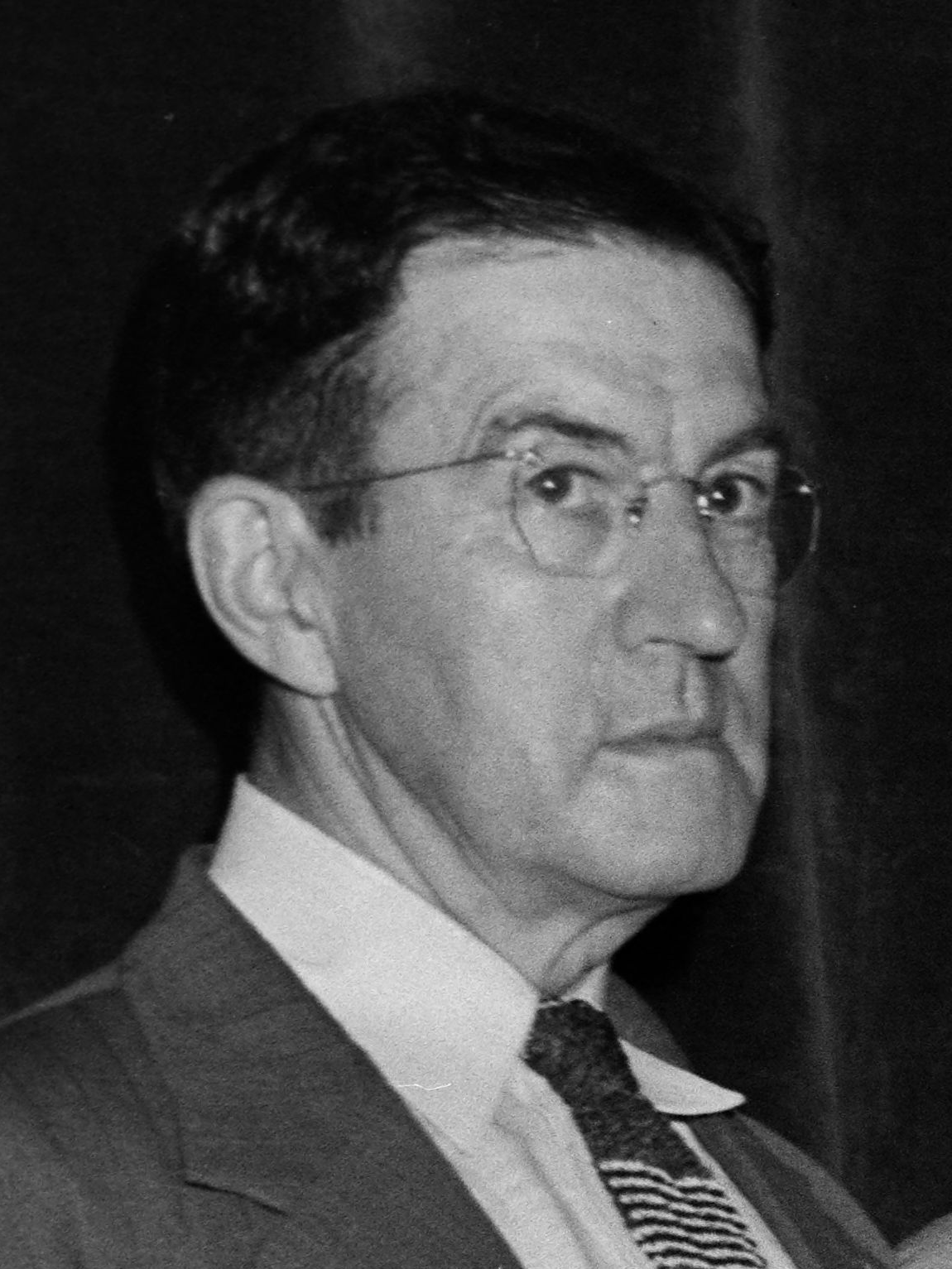
- Hendley c. 1941
- Born: June 4, 1881; North Carolina, U.S.
- Died: December 23, 1962 (aged 81); Baltimore, Maryland, U.S.
- Education: University of North Carolina at Chapel Hill, Columbia University
- Occupations: Teacher, education reformer, union activist
- Known for: President of the New York City Teachers Union
- Spouse: Okla Dees (m. 1916)
- Children: 2

Charles James Hendley (June 4, 1881 – December 23, 1962) was an American teacher, education reformer, and union activist. He served as president of the New York City Teachers Union (TU) from 1935 to 1945 (just after a minority split off to form the New York City Teachers Guild).

== Background ==
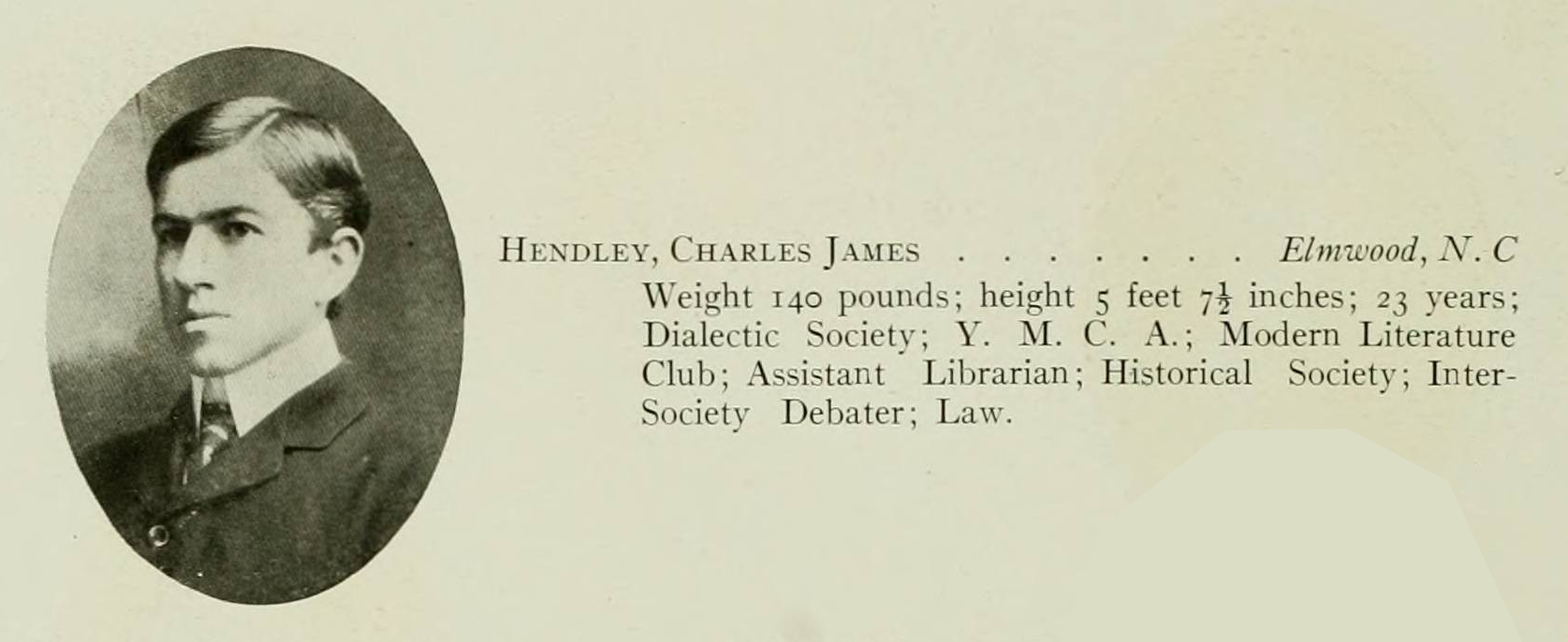
Hendley in the University of North Carolina at Chapel Hill yearbook, 1905

Charles James Hendley was born on June 4, 1881, in North Carolina. His father was Alvis Francis Hendley, section foreman on the Southern Railway.

In 1905, he graduated from the University of North Carolina at Chapel Hill. Later, he earned an M.A. degree from Columbia University.

== Career ==
=== Teaching ===
Initially, Hendley taught in North Carolina. In 1915, he moved north. In 1919, Hendley helped organize a local of the American Federation of Teachers in Paterson, New Jersey. In 1920, he taught labor classes for Pennsylvania's State Federation of Labor in Bethlehem, Reading, and Lancaster. In New York, he taught labor classes for Local 3 of the International Brotherhood of Electrical Workers union and for a local union of telegraphers.

From 1921 to 1946, Hendley taught history and economics at George Washington High School.

=== Union activism ===
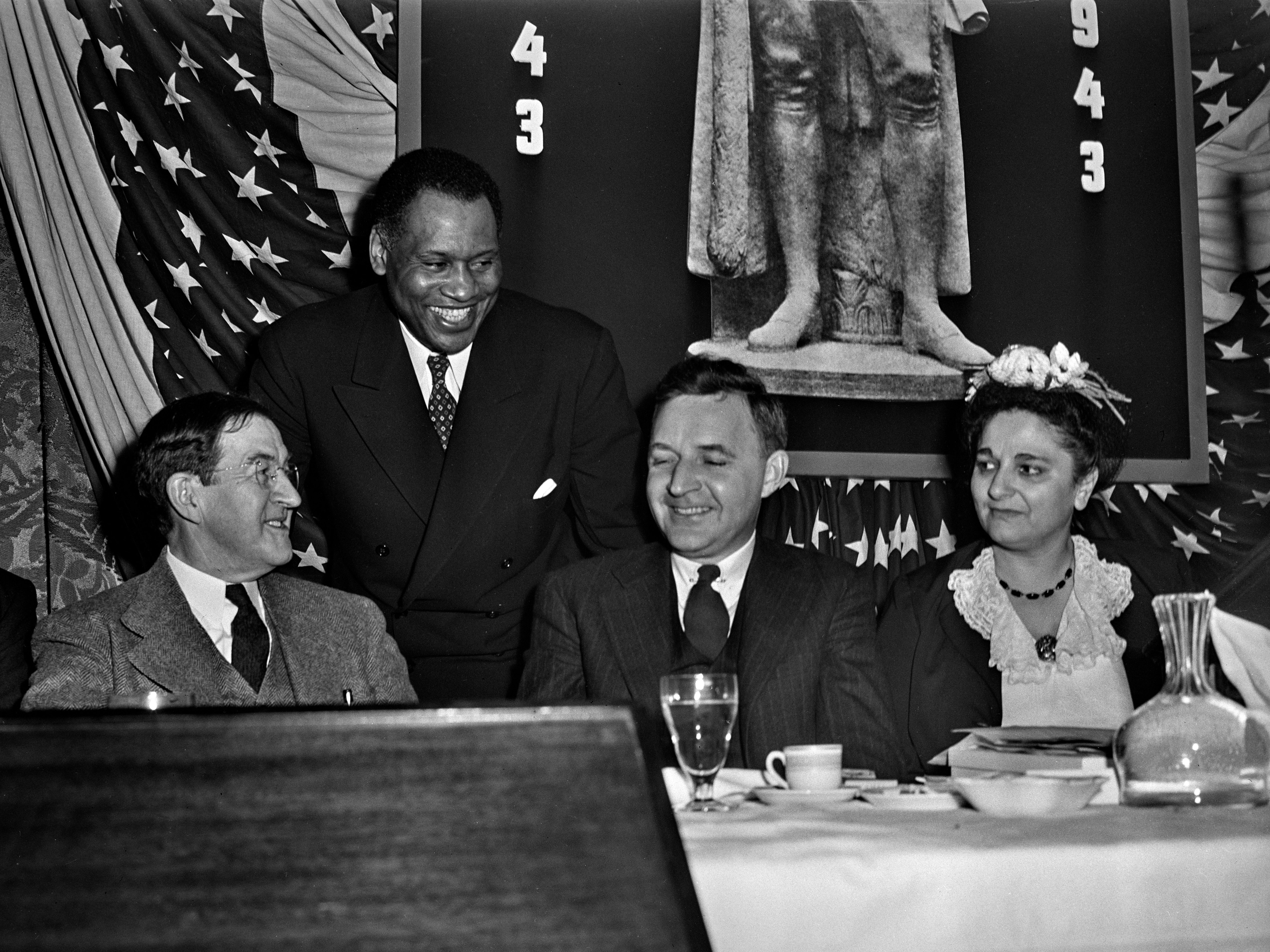
Hendley (far left) at a Teachers Union luncheon at the Commodore Hotel in New York City, April 17, 1943 Left to right: Charles J. Hendley, Paul Robeson, Julius Emspak, Bella Dodd.

In 1921, Hendley also joined the Teachers Union. From 1922 to 1932, he served as TU treasurer. In 1935, just as the Teachers Guild was splitting away, Hendley was the only executive leader to remain with the TU. He became TU president until his retirement from teaching in 1945 (or 1946 or 1947). In 1936, he advocated for the college and high school unionization of teachers and for collective bargaining rights of teachers. In 1937, the Socialist Party asked Hendley not to run again: Hendley won 3,333 votes of 3,411. His secretary at the TU was Dorothy Wallace, who was the sister of Dale Zysman, TU vice president. During his tenure as president, the Central Trades and Labor Council expelled the TU (and the ILGWU, as Hendley pointed out during testimony in 1952). the American Federation of Labor also expelled the TU while he was president. After retirement, Hendley served on TU's Executive Board, on its Educational Policies Committee, and as director of the Teachers Union Institute. He remained a TU member until his death in 1965.

In 1946, Hendley became a field representative of the National Teachers Division of the United Public Workers of America (UPWA/CIO) through 1948.

In 1951, he became both stockholder in and Secretary-Treasurer of Publishers New Press, Inc., publisher of CPUSA's official newspaper, the Daily Worker. He signed the incorporation papers.

=== Politician ===
From "early years as a teacher," Hendley was member of the Socialist Party of America through 1938. At an unspecified date, he grew "closer to the Communist Party of the USA." However, while Bella Dodd was a member of the CPUSA in the 1940s through her expulsion in 1949, she testified that Hendley was not a Communist but a Socialist.

Hendley was a member of the Communist-affiliated American Labor Party. In 1948 he ran for State Senate (28th District, Bronx). In 1950, he ran for U.S. Congress (25th Congressional District).

== Government investigations ==
In 1940, Hendley appeared before the Rapp-Coudert Committee and refused to surrender the TU's membership list. In January 1941, however, he complied and supplied the list. (During committee hearings, former TU member Benjamin Mandel and professor Sidney Hook both testified that Hendely was a puppet of the Communist Party.)

In 1952, as former TU president and current Secretary-Treasurer (and stockholder) of Publishers New Press, he was called before the Senate Internal Security Subcommittee and refused to answer many questions. His attorneys were Harold Cammer (one-time partner of Lee Pressman and Nathan Witt of the Ware Group led by Whittaker Chambers) and Royal W. France. He did state that TU membership "at one time" was close to "10,000." He conceded that the board of directors of the Publishers New Press controlled the editorial policy of the Daily Worker. Based on "40 years or more" of study, he stated to the subcommittee that "The Communist Party in America is absolutely independent of the Communist Party of Russia." He refused to answer questions about Communist Party affiliation. The committee cited an article from the Daily Worker to list the board of directors of the Publishers New Press as of October 8, 1951: Hendley, Joseph Dermer (Furriers), Howard Fast (writer), Richard O. Boyer (writer), Arnold Donawa (dentist), Ulysses Campbell (dentist), Elliot White (clergyman), Helen Alfred (social worker), Vincent Provinzano (Furriers), and Alex Kolkin (ILGWU). Of Bella Dodd's assertion that Hendley's TU secretary Dorothy Wallace was TU vice president Dale Zysman's sister, Hendley first state "I think that is a fiction of Bella Dodd's imagination" and then stated "To my knowledge, she is not a sister of Dale Zysman... I am not intimately acquainted with her family."

In 1962, again because of Publishers New Press, Hendley was called before a Grand Jury inquiry and refused to answer questions.

== Personal life ==
In 1916, Charles Hendley married Okla Dees of Grantboro, North Carolina; they had two sons.

In 1952, Bella Dodd characterized Hendley as "a person with very definite views on the whole question of schools and socialists."

== Death and legacy ==
In 1962, Henley died. The Tamiment Library has archived the Charles J. Hendley Papers.

== Works ==
- "Unionism in the Educational Field," Teachers College Record (1939)

== See also ==
- New York City Teachers Union (TU)
- New York City Teachers Guild (TG)
- American Federation of Teachers (AFT)
- Abraham Lefkowitz
- Henry Linville
- Bella Dodd
- Dale Zysman

== External sources ==
- Letter from Charles J. Hendley to Daily Worker, October 24, 1951
- New York Times Hendley proposes new arts test (1938)
