= Albert Shanker =

American labor leader (1928–1997)

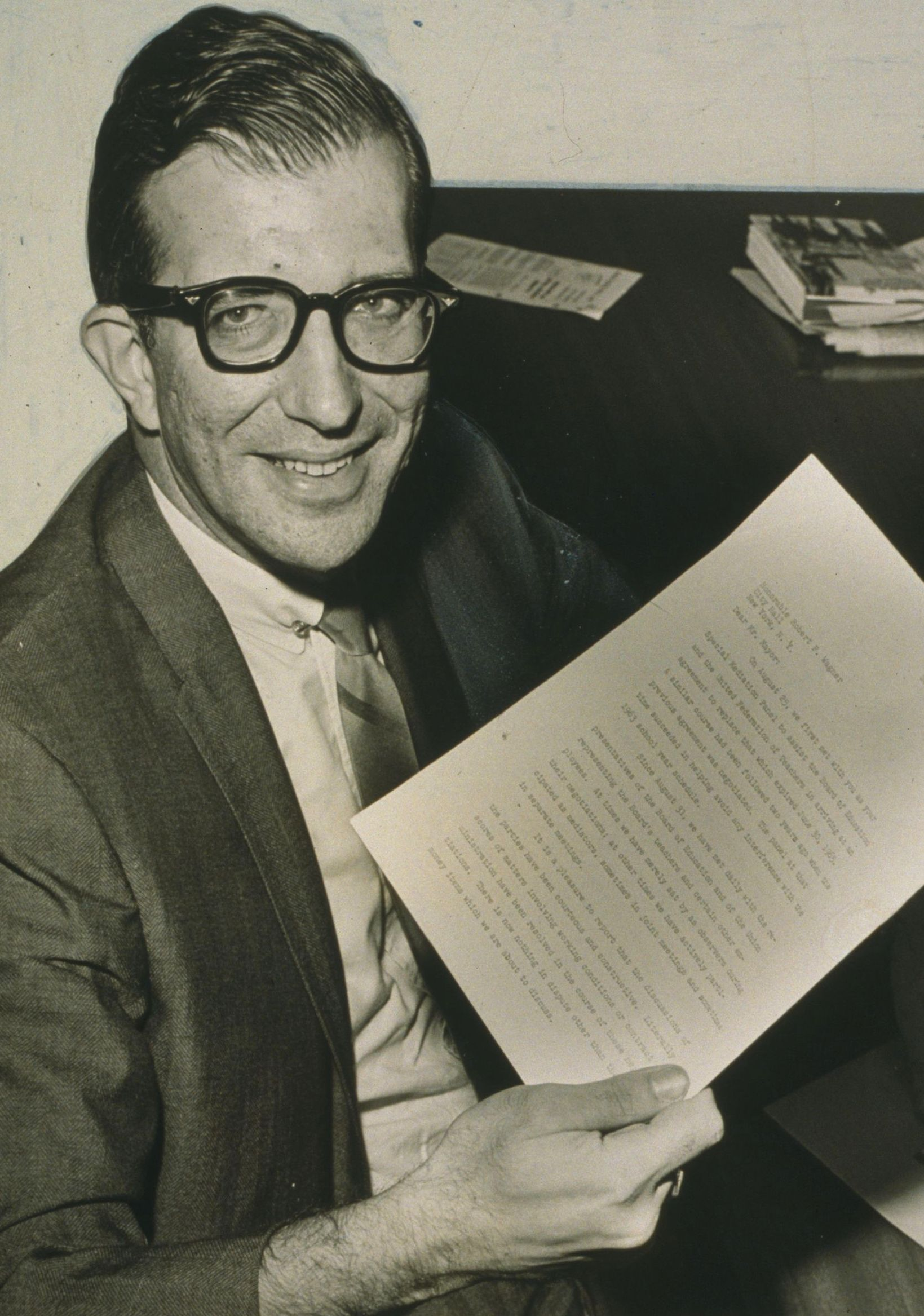
- Shanker in 1965
- Born: September 14, 1928; New York City, New York, U.S.
- Died: February 22, 1997 (aged 68); New York City, New York, U.S.
- Education: Stuyvesant High School
- Alma mater: University of Illinois at Urbana-Champaign (BA); Columbia University
- Occupations: Labor Leader, AFT & UFT President
- Spouses: Pearl Sabath (1949–1960); Edith Shanker (1960–1997)
- Children: 4

Albert Shanker (September 14, 1928 – February 22, 1997) was an American union organizer and labor activist. He served as president of the United Federation of Teachers from 1964 to 1985, and president of the American Federation of Teachers (AFT) from 1974 to 1997.

== Early life and education ==
Shanker was born on Manhattan's Lower East Side in New York City to a Russian Jewish immigrant family. As a toddler, his family moved to the Long Island City district in Queens.

His parents, Mamie and Morris Shanker, were immigrants from Poland. Both were union members; his father was a union newspaper deliveryman, and his mother, who operated a sewing-machine in a knitting factory, was a member of the Amalgamated Clothing Workers of America. The Shanker family's deeply held political views were staunchly pro-union, following the socialism of Norman Thomas and including ardent support of Franklin Roosevelt and the New Deal. The experience of watching his mother work 70-hour weeks convinced Shanker from an early age that there was a need for societal changes.

Shanker read several newspapers daily as a young boy, with an interest in philosophy. His idols were Franklin D. Roosevelt, Clarence Darrow, civil rights leader Bayard Rustin and American philosopher Sidney Hook.

In 1946, Shanker graduated from Stuyvesant High School, where he was the head of the debate team. Thereafter, he majored in philosophy at the University of Illinois Urbana-Champaign. He joined the Congress of Racial Equality. Shanker picketed segregated movie theaters and restaurants and was a member of the Young People's Socialist League and chairman of the Socialist Study Club. In 1949, he graduated with honors and began graduate studies at Columbia University, where he ultimately attained all but dissertation status. In order to earn money while writing his dissertation, Shanker became a substitute mathematics teacher at Public School 179 in East Harlem, a historically working class neighborhood near Columbia's campus. He later taught mathematics in a full-time role at Junior High School 126 in the Astoria section of Queens from 1953 to 1959.

== Career ==
He began his tenure as a union organizer in 1959 to help organize the Teacher's Guild, a New York City affiliate of the American Federation of Teachers that was founded by John Dewey in 1917. Eventually, the Teacher's Guild merged with New York City's High School Teacher's Association to form the United Federation of Teachers (UFT) in 1960. During the 1960s, Shanker received national attention and considerable criticism for his aggressive union leadership and skillful negotiation of salary increases for New York City teachers. He left his teaching job to become a full-time union organizer. He felt that a teachers' union would be more effective if it were united with a common set of goals. In 1964, Shanker succeeded Charles Cogen as the UFT president, a position he held until 1985. In 1967 and again in 1968, he served jail sentences for leading illegal teachers' strikes. The New York City teachers' strike of 1968 closed down almost all New York City schools for 36 days.

Shanker opposed community-control leaders in the Ocean Hill-Brownsville district of New York City, which led to the 1968 strike after white teachers were dismissed from the school district by the recently appointed black administrator.

Shanker wrote more than 1,300 columns in The New York Times (which appeared as paid advertisements) and essays in other publications. Accompanied by a small photograph of Shanker, the Times columns, titled "Where We Stand", sought to clarify the union's position on matters of public interest.

Shanker was a key figure in building the United Federation of Teachers and was elected president of the American Federation of Teachers in 1974. He was re-elected every two years until his death.

Shanker's organizing efforts for educators cannot be separated from the legacy of his actions related to racial inequity and anti-Blackness. Shanker is remembered for his actions during the Ocean Hill–Brownsville crisis. In 1968, Black and Puerto Rican parents in Brooklyn were piloting a community school program, known as community control, where school districts had the power to hire, fire, and approve budgets at the local level. The pilot program was designed to fight school segregation and racial inequity in school policies, teacher hiring, and Black and Puerto Rican student outcomes. When the majority Black and Puerto Rican school board fired 14 white union teachers for underperformance, Shanker led UFT teachers in a strike to oppose community control.

When the UFT proposed Lesson Plans on African-American History, "Shanker personally intervened and cut out radical ideas." His intervention included removal of two chapters on Malcolm X and Fredrick Douglass's words, "power concedes nothing without a demand."

In 1975, the UFT authorized a five-day strike, leading to allegedly saving New York City from bankruptcy after Shanker asked the Teachers' Retirement System to invest $150 million in municipal bonds.

On September 21, 1981, Shanker had dinner with Leon B. Applewhaite, a personal friend and one of the three members of the Federal Labor Relations Authority (FLRA). Applewhaite was involved in deciding whether to uphold the decertification of the Professional Air Traffic Controllers Organization for the strike they had called in August of that year. During the dinner, Shanker urged Applewhaite not to decertify the union, an action which plainly violated the prohibition on the ex parte contact contained in the federal Administrative Procedure Act. Although the contact was not ultimately found to have legal consequences, the United States Court of Appeals for the District of Columbia Circuit criticized Shanker's behavior in their review of the FLRA's decision:

We are astonished at his claim that he did nothing wrong. Mr. Shanker frankly concedes that he "desired to have dinner with Member Applewhaite because he felt strongly about the PATCO case and he wished to communicate directly to Member Applewhaite sentiments he had previously expressed in public." While we appreciate Mr. Shanker's forthright admission, we must wonder whether it is a product of candor or a failure to comprehend that his conduct was improper. In case any doubt still lingers, we take the opportunity to make one thing clear: It is simply unacceptable behavior for any person directly to attempt to influence the decision of a judicial officer in a pending case outside of the formal, public proceedings.

In 1988, Shanker was the first to propose charter schools in the U.S. He was inspired by a visit to a public school in Cologne, Germany, in which teams of teachers had considerable control over how the school was run, and about what and how to teach. They stayed with each class of students for six years. The schools were integrated by ethnic and economic origins, and were originally intended to focus on the neediest students, drop-outs and those most likely to drop out soon.

In 1993, Shanker turned against the charter school idea when he realized that for-profit organizations saw it as a business opportunity and were advancing an agenda of school privatization. Indeed, the charter schools that were finally established in the U.S. were different from Shanker's vision. "On average, charter schools are even more racially and economically segregated than traditional public schools," according to an opinion piece in The New York Times explaining Shanker's views.

Although Shanker marched for civil rights with Martin Luther King Jr., later in his career Shanker moved politically to the right. He came out in proud support of the Vietnam War.

Shanker was a visiting professor at Hunter College and Harvard University during the 1980s. He continued to work toward organizing teachers throughout his life and attempted to bridge the AFT with the National Education Association, which he never saw happen. In 1991, U.S. President George H. W. Bush appointed him as a member of the original Competitiveness Policy Council.

== Death ==
Shanker died of bladder cancer and was posthumously awarded the Presidential Medal of Freedom in 1998 by U.S. President Bill Clinton.

== In popular culture ==
Shanker is referenced in the Woody Allen movie Sleeper (1973). The protagonist is transported to the future, where he is told that the old world was destroyed when "a man named Albert Shanker got hold of a nuclear warhead." Film critic James Monaco wrote, "This is not funny at all, unless you know the cranky, whining head of the New York United Federation of Teachers".

=== Erroneous quote ===
The quote, "When schoolchildren start paying union dues, that's when I'll start representing the interests of school children", is sometimes erroneously attributed to Shanker, as was done by Joel Klein in 2011 and Mitt Romney in 2012, among others in conservative political circles. The Albert Shanker Institute attempted to find the source of this quote, and concluded that "we cannot demonstrate conclusively that Albert Shanker never made this particular statement ... but, we believe the quote is fiction." The first appearance, which those at the Institute could find, was in the Meridian Star newspaper, in an editorial piece dated August 13, 1985, but no source is included in the article. Similarly, Washington Post fact-checkers concluded that "it's virtually impossible to prove a negative, but the evidence suggests that the quote didn't come from Shanker and that someone with an agenda probably twisted his words."

Shanker's biographer, Richard Kahlenberg, found no record of Shanker's ever saying this and does not believe he ever did.

== See also ==
- Albert Shanker Institute

== Bibliography ==
- Braun, Robert J., Teachers and Power: The Story of the American Federation of Teachers, New York City: Simon & Schuster, 1972. ISBN 0-671-21167-6
- Buhle, Paul, "Albert Shanker: No Flowers," New Politics, vol. 6, no. 3, Summer 1997. (Accessed October 15, 2006)
- Gibson, Rich. "The AFT and Albert Shanker," Black Radical Congress, November 6, 2000. (Accessed October 15, 2006)
- Gordon, Jane Anna, Why They Couldn't Wait: A Critique of the Black-Jewish Conflict Over Community Control in Ocean-Hill Brownsville, 1967-1971. Oxford, UK: RoutledgeFalmer, 2001. ISBN 0-415-92910-5
- Kahlenberg, Richard D., Tough Liberal: Albert Shanker and the Battles Over Schools, Unions, Race, and Democracy, New York City: Columbia University Press, 2007. ISBN 0-231-13496-7
  - An excerpt from "The Agenda that Saved Public Education," American Educator, fall 2007, pp. 4–10.
  - Review in Slate
- Mungazi, Dickson A., Where He Stands: Albert Shanker of the American Federation of Teachers, Westport, Conn.: Greenwood Publishing Group, 1995. ISBN 0-275-94929-X
- NY Times Obituary
- Podair, Jerald, The Strike That Changed New York: Blacks, Whites, and the Ocean Hill-Brownsville Crisis, New Haven: Yale University Press, 2004. ISBN 0-300-08122-7
- Schierenbeck, Jack, "Part 6: Al Shanker's Rise to Power," Class Struggles: The UFT Story, United Federation of Teachers, AFT, AFL-CIO, February 16, 1996. (Accessed October 15, 2006)
- Selden, David, Teacher Rebellion. Washington, D.C.: Howard University Press, 1985. ISBN 0-88258-099-X
- Taft, Philip. United they teach; the story of the United Federation of Teachers (1974) online

Trade union offices
Preceded by David Selden	President, American Federation of Teachers; 1974 - 1997	Succeeded by Sandra Feldman
Preceded by Erich Frister	President of International Federation of Free Teachers' Unions; 1981–1992	Succeeded by Federation merged
Preceded by New position	President of Education International; 1992–1993	Succeeded by Mary Hatwood Futrell
