= Local 5 =

Local 5 is:

- A union chapter number, best known as "AFT Local 5" or the New York City Teachers Union (TU).
- A branding identity for television stations that broadcast NTSC analog signals over VHF channel 5 or ATSC digital signals which remap to virtual channel 5 via PSIP.
  Specifically, it refers to the following television broadcasters in the United States:
  - WFRV-TV in Green Bay, Wisconsin (CBS affiliate)
  - WOI-DT in Ames, Iowa (ABC affiliate)
