= Local 2 =

Local 2 can refer to American labor unions and broadcast stations:

- "Local 2" refers to the New York City Teachers Guild (1935-1960), designed as "Local 2, AFT" by the American Federation of Teachers (AFT) in June 1941
- The moniker Local 2 is used by the following stations:
  - KBCI-TV (now KBOI-TV) channel 2, a CBS affiliate in Boise, Idaho (used circa 2007)
  - KMID channel 2, an ABC affiliate in Midland, Texas (used from 2014 to 2018)
  - KPRC-TV channel 2, an NBC affiliate in Houston, Texas (used from 2004 to 2015)
  - KPSP-CD channel 38, a CBS affiliate in Palm Springs, California (seen on cable channel 2)
  - A cable channel operated by KUAM-TV in Hagåtña, Guam
