= Julius Emspak =

American trade unionist

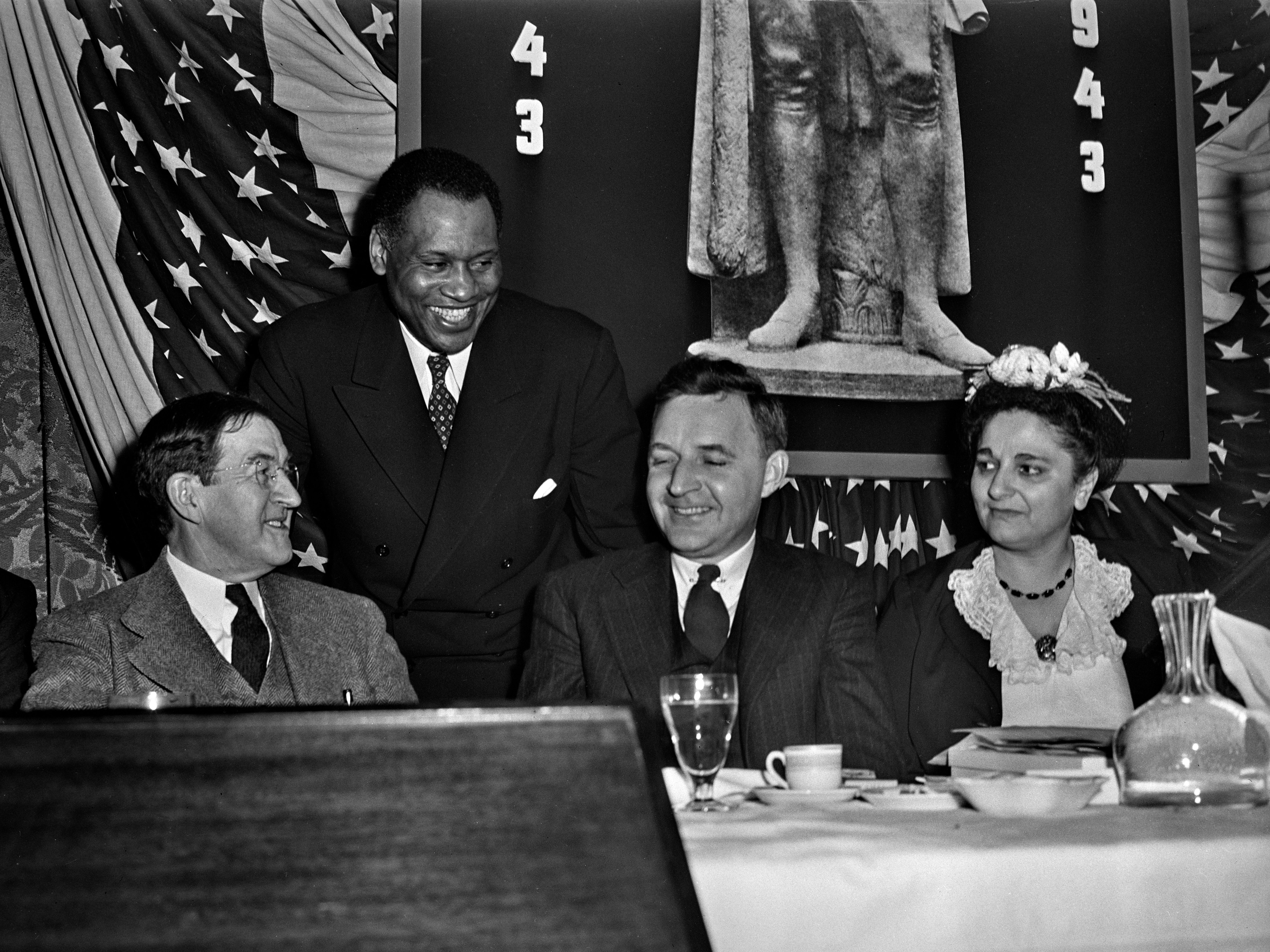
Emspak (second from right) at a Teachers Union luncheon at the Commodore Hotel in New York City, April 17, 1943 Left to right: Charles J. Hendley, Paul Robeson, Julius Emspak, Bella Dodd.

Julius Emspak (August 6, 1904–April 26, 1962) was an American trade unionist. Emspak was a co–founder of the United Electrical, Radio and Machine Workers of America (UE) and its first general secretary-treasurer (1936-62).

== Biography ==
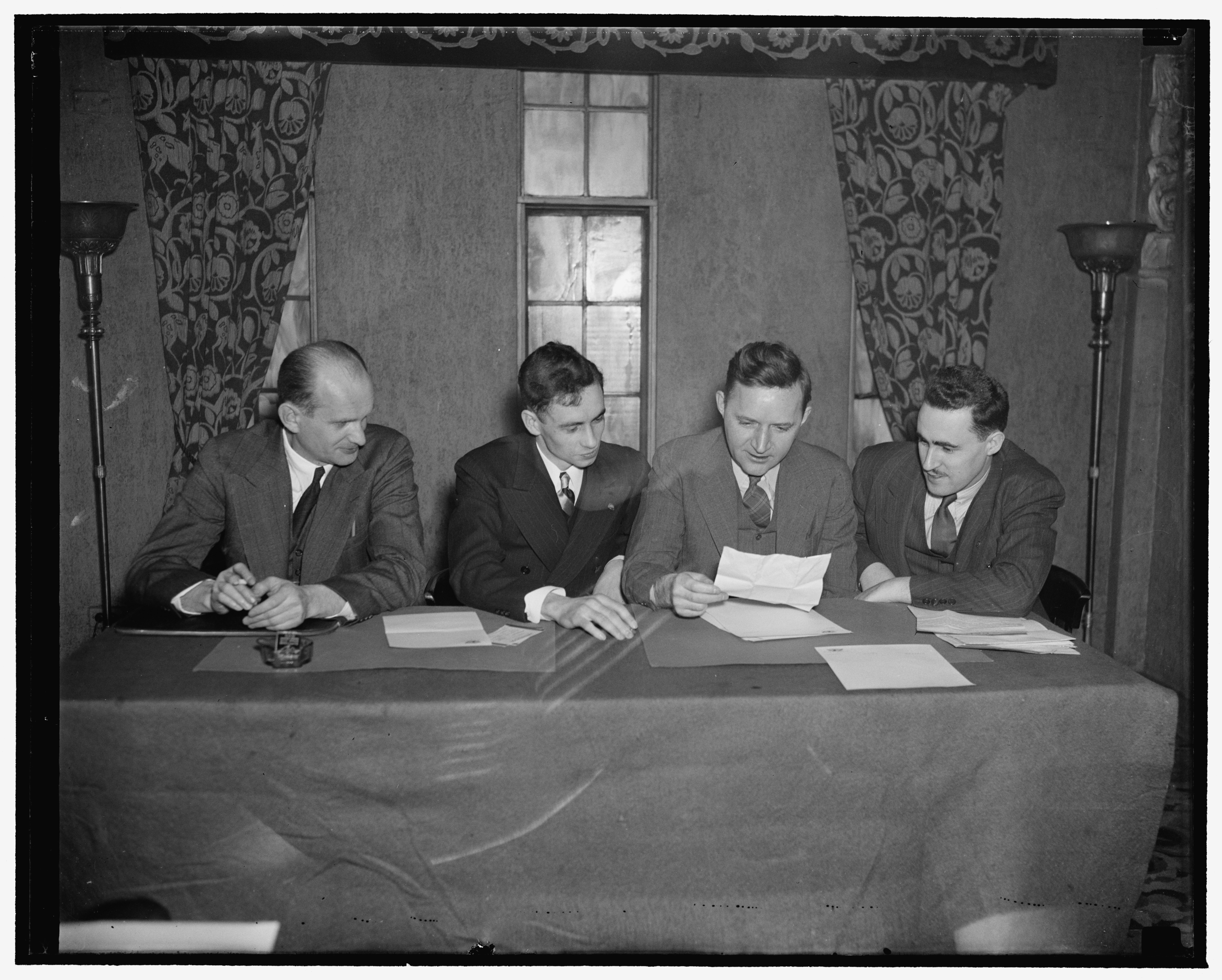
Emspak (second from right) with other CIO leaders, 1938

Emspak was born in 1904 in Schenectady, New York to Hungarian immigrant parents. He was the first of his family born in the United States. His father died in 1913 when Emspak was 9 years old. He left school at 14 to become an apprentice tool and die maker at General Electric's Schnectady factory.

In 1950, he was one of six UE leaders cited for contempt for failing to participate in the House Un-American Activities Committee (HUAC) hearings on the union.

Emspak died of a heart attack at the age of 57 in April 1962. The Monthly Review, a socialist magazine, described Emspak as one of the "finest representatives" of the "labor and radical movements of the United States."
