= Walter S. Steele =

American anti-communist activist (circa 1892–1962)

Walter S. Steele (died March 3, 1962) was an American editor and publisher of The National Republic monthly magazine and an anti-communist, anti-immigration activist.

== Early life ==
Walter S. Steele was born circa 1892 in Indiana. He had two sisters and a brother.

== Career ==
Steele started his career by working for Indiana newspapers. From 1916 through 1920, he was an alderman in Muncie.

=== National Republic magazine ===
Steele moved to Washington, DC, and in 1924 joined The National Republic—originally The National Republican of Muncie, published April 1925 to March 1960, which billed itself as "A National Organization Defending American Ideals and Institutions". During the 1930s and 1940s, Steele "waged a determined campaign against Communists throughin his magazine" and was also seen as anti-labor tendencies and accused of being pro-NazI.

=== Anti-communism and HUAC testimony ===
Steele appeared before the Dies Committee and its successor the House Un-American Activities Committee (HUAC).

During his December 29, 1934, testimony before the Dies Committee, Steele presented a speech "for the purpose of boiling my testimony down." His chief allegation was "The number of Communists and their affiliates in the United States at the present time is six times greater than that in Russia at the outset of the bloody revolution in that country." He immediately followed that statement by claiming that "The Communist movement has shown great gains in the United States since November 1933 than in any period of such short duration, and this in spite of the fact that on November 17, 1933, the soviet Government interested into a solemn written agreement with the Government of the United States." Steele stated he was editor of the National Republic Magazine and represented the "American Coalition."

During his July 21, 1947, testimony before HUAC, Steele leveled "spectacular charges," accused hundreds of Americans as communists, and claimed to be a spokesman for "20 million patriots." His testimony was "possibly the most irresponsible ever presented" to HUAC. (HUAC supported him so strongly that the committee issued a 188-page, stand-alone book of his testimony in 1947. In terms of timing, the testimony was most helpful to HUAC's Hollywood investigations into movie stars as famous as Charlie Chaplin - see the Hollywood Ten.)

On May 2, 1949, Steele spoke with Congressman Richard Nixon and HUAC research director Benjamin Mandel at a Knights of Columbus annual town hall.

=== Anti-immigration ===
Opponents accused him of "having anti-labor and anti-liberal tendencies." In 1937, Steele responded with denial to an accusation of distributing pro-Nazi propaganda made before a Massachusetts legislative investigating committee.

Steele served as chairman of the National Security Committee of the American Coalition of Patriotic, Civic and Fraternal Societies, founded by John B. Trevor Sr. (an American lawyer and "one of the most influential unelected officials affiliated with the U.S. Congress," even "the most influential lobbyist for restriction" of immigration, who along with David A. Reed and Samuel Gompers shaped the Immigration Act of 1924, which established restrictive immigration quotas through 1964).

Steele was an advisory board member of the "Paul Reveres," an "anti-Semitic coterie."

== Personal life and death ==
Steele married Valerie Knoobe; they had two daughters and a son.

Walter S. Steele died age 70 on March 2 or 3, 1962, in his Rockville, Maryland, home.
