= Benjamin Mandel =

American activist (1891–1973)

- Born: October 2, 1891
- Died: August 8, 1973 (aged 81); Washington, DC
- Other name: Bert Miller
- Years active: 1923–1967
- Known for: CPUSA functionary, HUAC research director

Benjamin Mandel (October 2, 1891 – August 8, 1973) a.k.a. "Bert Miller" was an American school teacher and communist activist who later became an ex-communist director of research for the House Un-American Activities Committee (HUAC) and the Senate Internal Security Subcommittee (SIS).

== Background ==
Benjamin Mandel was born in on October 2, 1891, in New York City.

== Career ==
Mandel became a New York City schoolteacher and then organization secretary for the New York district of the Teachers Union.

=== Bert Miller ===
==== Communist Party of the USA (CPUSA) ====
Mandel used the name "Bert Miller" when he joined the Communist Party in the 1920s. On April 6, 1923, name appears in the letterhead of the 1922 Labor Defense Council in support of Bridgman Raid defendants (and forerunner of International Labor Defense or ILD) as a local committee member. Other members included Elizabeth Gurley Flynn, Freda Kirchwey, Eugene V. Debs, Norman Thomas, Mary Heaton Vorse, J.B. Matthews, and Nerma Berman (wife of Soviet spy Isaiah Oggins).

In 1925 he resigned his position as a teacher to work full-time for the Party. Whittaker Chambers remembered that "Bert Miller" signed his Party card in 1925.

In 1925–26, Bert Miller studied under Professor Scott Nearing in his Research Study Group for a forthcoming book called The Law of Social Revolution (1926). Classmates included Whittaker Chambers, Dale Zysman (vice president of the Teachers' Union), Bertram Wolfe, Ben Davidson (later co-founder of the Liberal Party of New York) and his wife Eve Dorf, Sam Krieger, Alfred J. Brooks, Myra Page, and Rachel Ragozin.

In 1926, Bert Miller ignited the 1926 Passaic textile strike, as related by Benjamin Gitlow in his 1939 memoir:

The man who started the ball rolling was Bert Miller, industrial organizer of District Two of the Party, which then included most of industrial New Jersey and Connecticut as well as New York City. Comrade Miller called to my attention the fact that the Botany Mills of Passaic had announced a wage cut of ten percent, beginning with October, 1925. I immediately instructed Miller to get in touch with our New Jersey comrades and explore the matter further, agreeing with him that on its face the situation seemed favorable enough for initiating agitation for a strike in retaliation for the wage cut. Miller was a veteran of the Party since its underground days and carried out his assignment expeditiously. His report convinced me that there was ample ground for developing a successful strike.

Albert Weisbord, main leader of the Passaic strike, recalled later and critically of both Miller ("the innocent") and the Communist Party:

In New York I contacted Bert Miller, a teacher made suddenly "industrial" organizer of the Party, who, as a newcomer in the office, tried to live up to a job he knew very little about...
I was just now, in 1924, that ignorant, unsuspicious me had to enter into that nest of intrigue, without the lightest inkling of the kind of leadership under which I was enlisting...
I soon found the approximately 400 strikers in meeting in a small hall near the mill... We built up a picket line, drew up our demands and created a semblance of organization. They no longer felt lost or abandoned... They wanted to see membership applications and membership dues books... Back in New York I reported all this to Miller. This innocent agreed that I should get application and membership cards printed. He was not aware that on this matter he would be bitterly assailed by the Foster-Cannon leadership for dual unionism and would open up a major struggle with the Party...
The worthlessness of the C.P. leaders did not in the least make me undervalue the great worth of the tens of thousands of devoted foreign-born workers and militant American-born youth who were the members and followers of that party... At the moment for me the important link in the chain was the innocent Bert Miller, acting on this own while the "bigs" were tied up with other matters, especially the N.Y. District Organizer Weinstone who was very busy intriguing with Cannon on how to form a new faction to end factions! Weinstone’s sloth and Miller’s ignorance were to help me much.

In 1926, Bert Miller also became business manager of the Daily Worker communist newspaper. His name first appears on the masthead in the November 26, 1926 issue, and appeared throughout 1926 and 1927 – the publication of "business manager" dropped from the masthead in 1928. Whittaker Chambers recalled:

In those days, Bert Miller was a harassed soul. As business manager of the Daily Worker, the future research director of the House Committee on Un-American Activities had to meet a weekly payroll and find money to pay the paper, print, and other bills. Money was very hard to find, and his life was a weekly crisis. Thus, my chief recollection of Bert Miller from the past is less than a face than as a weary plaint: money.
Bert suffered other grievances, too. In his business office, he presided over a number of young women Communists, one of whom was a remarkably pretty Hungarian girl. He often protested that his girls were terrified towalk through the Daily Worker office (as they sometimes had to) because, while they wriggled their way past he crowded chairs, each of the editors in turn reached back and pinched them.

In 1927, Mandel was elected to the Party's Central Committee at its fifth congress in 1927. In 1929, he was re-elected as a "candidate member" at its sixth convention in March 1929. Later that year, he was expelled with followers of Jay Lovestone (known at the Lovestoneites) as an "incurable right-wing deviationist".

==== Communist Party (Opposition) (CPO) ====
As of the first issue (November 1, 1929), Bert Miller appeared on the editorial board of Revolutionary Age, organ of the Communist Party (Majority) formed by Jay Lovestone, i.e., he joined Lovestone's Communist Party (Majority Group). Other editors included: Benjamin Gitlow, editor; Bertram Wolfe, associate editor; and editorial board members J.O. Bixby, Ellen Dawson, Will Herberg, William Miller, R. Pires, Jack Rubinstein, Frank Vrataric, Ed Welsh, W.J. White, Herbert Zam, and Charles S. Zimmerman.

Miller was also one of the original teachers at the New Workers School of the Lovestoneites, as advertised in the November 15 issue and detailed in a December 15 article.

In April 1930, Miller spoke in Philadelphia to some 300 workers regarding "The Crisis in the Communist Party of the USA."

During 1930, Miller joined the Conference for Progressive Labor Action.

In June 1931, the Communist League of Struggle (Adhering to the International Left Opposition), attached Miller as a Lovestone leader:

Do you think that it is an accident that out of your ranks, trained by Lovestone, have sprung OPEN RENEGADES from Communism, Bert Miller and Company? Can you not see that Bert Miller but does what Lovestone is planning to do -- later, that Miller is but the vanguard of Lovestone himself?
... In spite of intrigue on the part of the official Communist Party, the Lovestone group and its allies, Bert Miller and Ludwig Lore -- about 250 attended the Albert Weisbord-Louis F. Budenz debate at the Labor Temple, Saturday, May 2. The topic was "Shall the Workers Support the Conference for Progressive Labor Action in Preference to the Communists?"... After the posters, leaflets and advertisements announcing the debate were released, pressure to kill the debate opened. According to reports, William Z. Foster who was scheduled to debate Muste a week later, threatened to withdraw if Muste debated Weisbord first. Under the Party's pressure, Muste decided not to debate Weisbord and assigned Budenz in his stead. This was the time for Miller, the "communist" watch-dog and advisor to the C.P.L.A. to step in with his "expert" advice. Lore also advised Budenz not to go through with the arrangements.

By August 1931, the Lovestoneites were commenting angrily in Revolutionary Age: "As soon as this group of comrades entered the CPLA and began to function, a differentiation began to take place: Bert Miller, Levich, and Lawrence began to move rapidly to the extreme right, while the rest of the comrades under the leadership of Comrade Benjamin, took up a sharp struggle against social reformism and against Miller and his friends as well." Miller's push for this group caused Benjamin Gitlow to split with the Lovestoneites, who insisted that "Stalin's policies were a hundred percent correct." By October 1931, Revolutionary Age was calling Miller, Gitlow, and others "traitors":

ON WORKERS SOLIDARITY
A fine day of celebration for these traitors, who, together with Gitlow, Budenz, Bert Miller and Zimmerman and the smaller fry of Lovestone renegades, are trying to break the strike of the textile workers. Labor Day is a day that symbolizes the attempted sell-out of their militant struggles. It is a day of hatred of the system that makes use of such scum from Green, Woll to Gitlow, Budenz, Muste and the smaller gang of pickpockets, who pose as "labor leaders."
August 22, 1931, I. Amter

In 1931, Miller's name appeared as a national officer of the Joint Committee on Unemployment, headed by John Dewey. On November 19, 1931, "Benjamin Mandel" attended a protest against Italian foreign minister Dino Grandi, a "Fascist diplomat": as part of deputation from the Committee for International Anti-Fascist Protest, Mandel joined A.J. Muste, Roger Baldwin, and several Italian-Americans. On December 2, 1931, "Benjamin Mandel" as "organizer for the Brotherhood of Brooklyn Edison Employees" as well as observer for the Conference for Progressive Labor Action, joined a group of nine led by Rev. Eliot White, formerly of the Grace Episcopal Church, to distribute union literature, when they found themselves attacked by hundreds of people. In its December 1931 issue, Labor Age described Mandel as "labor organizer and writer... active in the White Plains Road Laborers Strike last summer... now helping the Brooklyn Edison Employes organization campaign." In 1932, Mandel had called for a bar to admittance of communists during a meeting to discuss the ongoing Harlan County coal strike that had started in 1931 (see Harlan County War):

"No communists are admitted here", was the greeting at the door, which met the delegate of the C.L.S., who tried to attend the "broad united front of labor", called by the I.W.W. General Defense Committee for the Harlan Kentucky miners on January 6. Of course it had to be the unspeakable Bert Miller, who handed out this information. All sorts of liberals, anarchists, and what not were gathered together, but the Communists were not even allowed to enter the hall!"

On March 6, 1932, Mandel joined a committee that supported the $375 million Costigan-La Follettee-Lewis relief bill, itself part of a $3 billion federal bill to provide housing credit, end sales taxes, and increases surtaxes and estate taxes.

=== Benjamin Mandel ===
On July 17, 1932, a new joint committee on unemployment in New York state formed under Bishop Francis J. McConnell of the Methodist Baptist Church in Manhattan. Committee members included: Sidney E. Goldstein, Stephen S. Wise, Mary Fox, Alfred Bernheim, Darwin J. Meserole, Howard Y. Williams, A.J. Muste, J.B. Matthews, William Spofford, Winifred Chappell, Abraham Lefkowitz, Sidney Hillman, Paul Blanshard, Jack Altman, Helen Alfred, Walter White, and LeRoy E. Bowman.

==== Dies Committee and Rapp Coudert ====
By the later 1930s, Bert Miller the former communist had become a dedicated anti-communist. His ideological change was partly inspired by an opposition to Stalinism and also partly by a distaste for factionalism and internecine squabbles in the American communist movement.

By 1939 he had resurfaced fully as "Benjamin Mandel" to help J.B. Matthews as a researcher for the Dies Committee until 1945. He also worked with the New York legislature during the Rapp-Courdert inquiry into the presence of Communist teachers in New York schools.

(In 1939, after Isaac Don Levine had introduced them, Walter Krivitsky told Chambers that "Ben Mandel" of the Dies Committee was "Bert Miller" of the Communist Party.)

In 1940 during Rapp-Coudert Committee investigations, Mandel became connected with Communist activities under the name "Bert Miller." The same year, Matthews connected "Benjamin Mandel" with "Bert Miller" during the testimony of Leonard Emil Mins before the Dies Committee.

On August 7, 1941, Mandel himself testified before Dies Committee regarding the China Aid Council, a subsidiary of the American League for Peace and Democracy. He named Dr. Owen Lattimore, Frederick V. Field, and others.

From 1945 to 1947, Mandel worked for the U.S. Department of State in handling security.

==== HUAC ====
In 1947, Mandel returned to former Dies Committee, now renamed the House Un-American Activities Committee (HUAC), "to assist the committee in the Hiss-Chambers case." He has been characterized, along with U.S. Representative J. Parnell Thomas and HUAC chief investigator Robert E. Stripling as one of the "choreographers of the hearings."

During the Hiss Case, Mandel participated in questioning during hearings. Mandel stated "A picture of Hiss shows his hand cupped to his ear," to which Chambers replied, "He is deaf in one ear." Mandel asked, "How is it that he (Hiss) never wrote anything publicly," to which Chambers answered, "He was never in the open Communist Party." Mandel checked for "George Crosley" as a government employee and received the negative findings from one Ernest S. Griffith, director of Legislative Reference Service. He also partook in the search for the Ford car sold by Hiss to William Rosen.

On May 2, 1949, Steele spoke with Congressman Richard Nixon and Walter S. Steele (publisher of The National Republic magazine and member of the American Coalition of Patriotic, Civic and Fraternal Societies, founded by John B. Trevor Sr.)) at a Knights of Columbus annual town hall.

==== SISS ====
In 1951, Mandel left HUAC and became research director in the Senate Internal Security Subcommittee, and stayed in that position until his retirement in 1967. During his SIS years, he took an active role in connect the influence of the Communist Party and communist-influenced labor unions (e.g., CIO) in the Teachers' Union and among teachers (e.g., see "Mandel" in 1952 hearings).

In May 1951, Benjamin Gitlow told the Senate's Subversive Activities Control Board that he had "repeatedly discussed" the board with its research director Mandel as well as another former Communist associate Joseph Zack Kornfeder. Gitlow said, "I discussed the conduct of this case. I discussed the attorneys in the case. I discussed the members of the panel."

In 1953, Eleanor Roosevelt criticized Mandel in her column:

I was sent a column the other day by a gentleman which he had clipped from a paper and felt was very convincing. The column was written by Benjamin Mandel, a former research director of the House Un-American Activities Committee and at present a member of the Senate Internal Security Subcommittee. Mr. Mandel was writing as a guest columnist for Mr. C. Brown.
Mr. Mandel in his column took all liberals and intellectuals to task for sitting in judgment on Congressional committees investigating Communist activities. Most of the column pointed out the "faults of liberals" and of course, being human beings, I don't suppose they are perfect but it seemed to me this column was very slanted in its reasoning.
Unquestionably, critical self-examination should be of value to liberals and intellectuals, but I have no doubt it would be of value to those who conduct Congressional investigations also.

In 1956, TASS deputy bureau chief Harry Freeman testified before SISS. Mandel read a passage from Whittaker Chambers' 1952 memoir Witness about Freeman at the Daily Worker. In retort, Freeman reminded SISS that Mandel was there, too, as business manager. On October 25, 1967, lawyers for the National Conference for New Politics (NCNP) and the Mississippi Freedom Democratic Party (MFDP) filed an order to take immediate sworn statements about documents from Senator James O. Eastland and subcommittee staffers, J.G. Sourwine and Mandel to enjoin any further distribution or use of the files. In 1959, I.F. Stone named Mandel as "another powerful Lovestoneite," while researcher Robert W. Iversen noted Mandel in his book The Communists & the Schools, and Theodore Draper consulted him for his book American Communism and Soviet Russia.

On November 1, 1967, Mandel announced his retirement. He continued to consult to that subcommittee for some years.

Mandel, following Matthews before him, supplied information about "suspect clergy" to Carl McIntire (1906–2002), a founder and minister in the Bible Presbyterian Church, founder and long-time president of the International Council of Christian Churches and the American Council of Christian Churches, and a popular religious radio broadcaster, who proudly identified himself as a fundamentalist.

== Personal and death ==
Mandel married Margaret Rees.

He believed in exposing the Communist Party in the U.S. and explained in 1951:

You've got to assume there is a present communist conspiracy, and it is obvious the communists want every additional scrap of atomic information they can lay hands on.
There are two ways to meet this conspiracy. One is to have a secret polic. The other is to develop the evidence in the American way, in open hearings and with sworn testimony. The goal should never be to railroad the people; always to respect civil liberties.

Mandel died age 82 on August 8, 1973, at the Mar-Salle Convalescent Home at 2131 O Street NW, Washington, DC.

== Works ==
According to his Washington Post obituary, Mandel was co-author of the book I Was a Soviet Worker, published in the U.S. in 1936 and in the U.K. in 1937.

As Bert Miller:

- "Giant Power," The Communist (August 1928)
- "Gandhi Betrays," Labor Age (May 1931)
- "Book Review: Kautsky at the Crossroads" Labor Age (July 1932)
- I Was a Soviet Worker (1936)
  - I Was a Soviet Worker (1937)

As Benjamin Mandel:

- "The Battle of White Plains," Labor Age (August 1931)
- "And These Are Our Rulers," Labor Age (September 1931)
- "America Welcomes Grandi," Labor Age (December 1931)
- "Roosevelt: Jingo-Liberal," Labor Age (June 1932)
- "After Roosevelt - What?" Colliers (~1932-1934)
- "Evaluation of the World Trade Union Federation" (1946?)
- "A Handbook for Americans: The Communist Party: What It Is, How It Works" (1955)

== See also ==
- Communist Party of the United States of America
- Jay Lovestone
- Teachers Union
- J.B. Matthews
- House Un-American Activities Committee
- Senate Internal Security Subcommittee
- Whittaker Chambers
- Alger Hiss
