= Teachers Guild =

American labor union for teachers

Teachers Guild (TG)
- New York City Teachers Guild – Local 2, AFT
- Predecessor: New York City Teachers Union
- Merged into: United Federation of Teachers
- Successor: United Federation of Teachers
- Founded: 1935
- Dissolved: 1960
- Location: United States of America
- Key people: Henry Linville, Abraham Lefkowitz (co-founders)
- Affiliations: American Federation of Teachers (AFT)

The New York City Teachers Guild (1935-1960), AKA "Local 2, AFT" as of June 1941, was a progressive labor union that started as breakaway from the New York City Teachers Union and later merged into the United Federation of Teachers.

== History ==
=== 1930s ===
The New York City Teachers Union (TU) had experience conflict internally for more of the early 1930s. The opposing groups were the founders (Henry Linville and Abraham Lefkowitz–at the time called "administrators") and "Rank and File" members (many of whom were also Communist Party members).

During an August 1935 national convention, the American Federation of Teachers (AFT) voted down a TU administrators' request to reorganize (100 to 79). On October 1, 1935, Linville and Lefkowitz led all officers, nearly all executive board members, and nearly 800 members (including Communist Lovestoneite members of a rival "Progressive Group") out of the TU to form the Teachers Guild (TG).

=== 1940s ===
On March 29, 1940, the New York State Legislature formed the "Rapp-Coudert Committee" to investigate finances (Rapp in the New York State Assembly) and subversive activities (Coudert in the New York State Senate). From September 1940 through December 1941, Coudert investigated more than 500 people regarding their affiliation with the Communist Party USA. Coudert's subcommittee focused on the TU Local 5 as well as a college professors union Local 537. Former TU leaders who had helped found the TG, Henry Linville and Benjamin Mandel, testified against TU members. On June 20, 1941, the AFT designated the TG as "Local 2, AFT." On December 29, 1940, the AFT voted and in May 1941 officially expelled three communist-influenced locals: the TU (Local 5, AFT), the New York College Teachers Union (Local 537, AFT), and the Philadelphia Teachers Union (Local 192, AFT). In June 1941, the AFT made the TG its "Local 5, AFT" in New York City. In 1943, the Rapp-Coudert Committee endorsed school financing policies of the TG.

=== 1950s ===
(Forthcoming)

=== 1960 ===
In March 1960, the TG and Committee of Action Through Unity (CATU) merged into the United Federation of Teachers (Local 2, AFT). In August 1960, New York's Board of Education and the UFT conducted initial collective bargaining.

== People ==
The TU was a client of Harold I. Cammer.

=== Presidents ===
All TG presidents were former members of the TU:

1. Henry Linville
2. Albert Smallheiser
3. Rebecca Simonson
4. Charles Cogen

=== Leaders ===
- Ben Davidson (politician)
- Layle Lane
- David Selden

== Assessment ==
In 2015, Nicholas Toloudis attributed the demise of the TU not only to Red Scares in the 1940s and 1950s but also to competition with other city teachers associations. In particular, the TG was "accommodating to the government, while the radical Union was confrontational" and "consistently sacrificed its commitment to academic freedom by collaborating with public authorities" to reveal TU ties to the CPUSA.

== See also ==
- Teachers Union
- United Federation of Teachers
- American Federation of Teachers
- Rapp-Coudert Committee

== External sources ==
- Subversive Influence in the Educational Process. US GPO. 1952.
- Alison (pseudonym), David (1951). Searchlight: An Exposé of New York City Schools. Teachers Center Press. p. 302.
- Eaton, William Edward (1 November 1975). The American Federation of Teachers, 1916-1961: a history of the movement. Southern Illinois University Press. pp. 240. ISBN 9780809307081.
- Gould, Sidney C. (1965). "A History of the New York City Teachers Union and Why It Died". The Educational Forum. 29 (2). Labor History: 207–215. doi:10.1080/00131726509339359.
- Iversen, Robert W. (1959). The Communists & the Schools. Harcourt, Brace. pp. 175 (post-WWII, ammunition), 360 (products), 361 (rejected), 362 (concentrated). LCCN 59011769.
- Heins, Marjorie (2013). High Priests of Democracy. New York University Press. ISBN 9780814790519.
- Muraskin, Lana Darlene (1979). The Teachers Union of the City of New York from Inception to Schism, 1912-1935. University of California, Berkeley. p. 444.
- Murphy, Marjorie (1990). Blackboard Unions: The AFT and the NEA, 1900-1980. Cornell University Press. pp. 284. ISBN 9780801423659.
- Schrecker, Ellen (1999). Many Are the Crimes: McCarthyism in America. Princeton University Press. p. 573. ISBN 9780691048703.
- Taft, Philip (1974). United they teach: the story of the United Federation of Teachers. Nash Pub. pp. 283. ISBN 9780840213310.
- Taylor, Clarence (1 September 2013). Reds at the Blackboard: Communism, Civil Rights, and the New York City Teachers Union. Columbia University Press. pp. 1–8 (overview), 11–13 (1916–1935). ISBN 9780231152693.
- Zitron, Celia Lewis (1969). The New York City Teachers Union, 1916-1964; a story of educational and social commitment. Humanities Press. p. 288.
