= The Strike That Changed New York =

2004 book by Jerald Podair

- Author: Jerald E. Podair
- Subject: History of American education, labor history
- Published: 2004 (Yale University Press)
- Pages: 288
- ISBN: 9780300109405
- OCLC: 49383875

The Strike That Changed New York is a history book about the New York City teachers' strike of 1968 written by Jerald Podair and published by the Yale University Press in 2004.
