= United Federation of Teachers =

American labor union for teachers

UFT
- United Federation of Teachers
- Founded: March 16, 1960
- Headquarters: 52 Broadway, New York, NY
- Location: United States
- Members: 189,624 (2022)
- Key people: Michael Mulgrew, president
- Affiliations: American Federation of Teachers
- Website: www.uft.org

The United Federation of Teachers (UFT) is the labor union that represents most teachers in New York City public schools. As of 2005, there were about 118,000 in-service teachers and nearly 30,000 paraprofessional educators in the union, as well as about 54,000 retired members. In October 2007, 28,280 home day care providers voted to join the union. It is affiliated with the American Federation of Teachers, the AFL–CIO and the Central Labor Council. It is also the largest member of New York State United Teachers, which is affiliated with the National Educational Association and Education International.

== History ==
Two previous unions of New York schoolteachers, the Teachers Union, founded in 1916, and the Teachers Guild, founded in 1935, failed to gather widespread enrollment or support. Many of the early leaders were pacifists or socialists and so frequently met with clashes against more right-leaning newspapers and organizations of the time, as red-baiting was fairly common. The ethnically and ideologically diverse teachers associations of the city made the creation of a single organized body difficult, with each association continuing to vie for its own priorities irrespective of the others.

The UFT was created on March 16, 1960, and grew rapidly. On November 7, 1960, the union organized a major strike. The strike largely failed in its main objectives but obtained some concessions, as well as bringing much popular attention to the union. After much further negotiation, the UFT was chosen as the collective bargaining organization for all city teachers in December 1961.

Albert Shanker, a controversial but successful organizer was president of the UFT from 1964 until 1984. He held an overlapping tenure as president of the national American Federation of Teachers from 1974 to his death in 1997.

In 1968, the UFT went on strike and shut down the school system in May and then again from September to November to protest the decentralization plan that was being put in place to give more neighborhoods community control. The Ocean Hill-Brownsville strike focused on the Ocean Hill-Brownsville neighborhood of Brooklyn but, ironically, the schools in that area were among the few that were open in the entire city. The Ocean Hill-Brownsville crisis is often described as a turning point in the history of unionism and of civil rights, as it created a rift between African-Americans and the Jewish communities, two groups that were previously viewed as allied. The two sides threw accusations of racism and anti-Semitism at each other.

Following the 1975 New York City fiscal crisis, some 14,000 teachers were laid off and class size soared. Another strike addressed some of these complaints and gave long-serving teachers longevity benefits.

=== Caucuses ===
The Unity Caucus, formed in 1962, predominates in the union, holding nearly every leadership position. New Action formed in the 1980s as an opposition caucus but, since 2003, it has cross-endorsed Unity candidates. The Movement of Rank and File Educators (MORE) is a relatively new caucus, formed in 2012, whose stated focus is to "[defend] members' rights, [fight] for social justice, and [empower] workers in schools."

In the spring of 2013, UFT election campaign, president Michael Mulgrew (Unity) refused repeated requests to debate his opponent, Julie Cavanagh (MORE).

== Composition ==
Total membership (US records)
View chart definition.
Finances (US records; ×$1000)
View chart definition.

According to UFT's Department of Labor records since 2005, when membership classifications were first reported, about 32% of the union's membership are considered retirees, with eligibility to vote in the union. UFT contracts also cover some non-members, known as agency fee payers, which, since 2005, have numbered comparatively about 1% of the size of the union's membership. As of 2013, this accounts for 59,444 retirees and 2,675 non-members paying agency fees, compared to 124,145 "active" members.

== Current issues ==
The previous president of the UFT, Randi Weingarten, resigned in 2009 to lead the American Federation of Teachers. She has clashed repeatedly with the mayors of the city; in particular with former mayor Rudy Giuliani and mayor Michael Bloomberg. Bloomberg made student promotion to third, sixth and eighth grade contingent upon performance on standardized tests, which the UFT and the New York Board of Regents have criticized as being flawed.

The UFT opposes merit pay for teachers, opting for seniority-based pay, but joined in November 2007, with Mayor Bloomberg in agreeing to a voluntary incentive program for high-achieving schools with high-needs populations. The union does not support a proposed reform of the seniority-based LIFO (education) law. In July 2007, Weingarten collaborated with Mayor Bloomberg in supporting a modified merit pay program with bonuses to schools and additional bonuses targeted for specific teachers.

The UFT strongly supports the reduction of class sizes for all subjects and grade levels in New York City public schools.

The UFT, under the leadership of presidents Weingarten and Mulgrew, has collaborated with tenets of the education reform movement, such as support for value-added modeling for teacher evaluation.

In 2023, the UFT sued New York City for school cuts.

In 2023, the UFT negotiated with the City for a plan that would move UFT retirees and other retired New York City workers from traditional Medicare into a new, privately run Medicare Advantage plan. Large numbers of UFT retirees have complained about the proposed plan. Retired UFT members and other New York City retirees have protested that the new plan falls short and organized opposition to the new plan.

In 2024, the UFT sued to block congestion pricing in lower Manhattan. The union argued that congestion pricing would worsen pollution and harm children.

== Lawsuit against school co-location ==
In May 2011, the UFT, along with the NAACP and others, filed a lawsuit against the New York City Department of Education to stop school closings and the co-location of schools. In the lawsuit, the union charged that the Department of Education was improperly closing schools. The lawsuit also asked the court to stop school co-locations. Before a court hearing on the suit in June 2011, parent groups held a news conference to thank the NAACP for fighting on behalf of all kids and to press for fairness and equity.

The New York City Parents Union filed its own lawsuit in June 2011 to stop co-locations and school closings, stating, “Despite inconsistent and uncertain results, the DOE continues to push public school parents into a privately managed school system where many charters perform worse than the public schools while failing to serve their fair share of students with special needs and English Language Learners.”

== Preventing layoffs ==
On Friday, June 24, 2011, UFT President Michael Mulgrew, along with City Council Speaker Christine Quinn and New York City Mayor Michael Bloomberg, announced that an agreement had been reached to prevent the layoff of 4,100 New York City teachers. The agreement came six months after Mayor Bloomberg had warned 21,000 layoffs were possible. The union had opposed all layoffs with a strategy of leafleting, marches and rallies, including a march on Wall Street on May 12, 2011, with 20,000 participants.

== Presidents ==
1960–1964: Charles Cogen
1964–1985: Albert Shanker
1986–1998: Sandra Feldman
1998–2008: Randi Weingarten
2009–present: Michael Mulgrew

== See also ==
- Council of School Supervisors & Administrators: trade union representing supervisors in NYC schools
- Teachers Union
- Teachers Guild
- American Federation of Teachers
- History of education in New York City
