= Henry Linville =

American labor union leader and teacher

Henry Linville (often Henry R. Linville) (August 12, 1866 in St. Joseph, Missouri – October 1, 1941 in North Carolina) was a co-founder of the New York City Teachers Union (TU) in 1916 and the New York City Teachers Guild (TG), which broke off from the TU in 1935. He also served as president of the American Federation of Teachers (AFT) from 1931 to 1934.

== Background ==
Henry Richardson Linville was born in 1866 in St. Joseph, Missouri. He received a bachelor's (1894), master's (1895) and doctorate (1897) degrees from Harvard University.

== Career ==
Linville moved to New York City and became a biology teacher at a high school.

In 1912, Linville served as editor of The American Teacher.

In 1916, Linville and Abraham Lefkowitz co-founded the TU, for which Linville served as president. In 1931, Linville served as president of the American Federation of Teachers (AFT) through 1934. In 1935, when Linville and Lefkowitz left the TU to form the TG, Linville served as both president and executive director.

== Death ==
Linville died on October 1, 1941, in an automobile accident in North Carolina.

== Works ==
In addition to editing of The American Teacher, Linville drafted drafts of chapters for a book to be called Communists at Work.

- Maturation and Fertilization in Pulmonate Gasteropods (1900)
- A Textbook In General Zoology with Henry A. Kelly (1906)
- Guide for laboratory and field work in zoology (~1906)
- Biology of man and other organisms (1923)
- Manual of laboratory studies in biology (1924)
- Oaths of Loyalty for Teachers (1935)

== See also ==
- New York City Teachers Union (TU)
- New York City Teachers Guild (TG)
- American Federation of Teachers (AFT)
- Abraham Lefkowitz
- Charles J. Hendley

== External source ==
- Walter P. Reuther Library Photo of Linville
