= Robert W. Iversen =

American professor of history (1920–1988)

Robert William Iversen (April 22, 1920 – September 28, 1988) was an American historian who wrote The Communists and the Schools in 1959, which discusses the Teachers Union, Local 5 of the American Federation of Teachers in New York City; the book is often cited by scholars on academic freedom in the 20th-century United States.

== Early life and education ==
Robert William Iversen was born on April 22, 1920, in Minneapolis, Minnesota. In 1942, he obtained a BA from the University of Minnesota, followed by MA and doctorate from the State University of Iowa.

During World War II, Iversen served in the United States Army as staff sergeant in the 37th Engineer Combat Battalion.

== Career ==
Iversen became a college professor who specialized in 20th-century American history. He taught at the State University of Iowa, Drake University (circa 1950–1956), Columbia University, Pennsylvania State University, where in 1959 he was professor of Social Science and assistant director of the Center for Continuing Liberal Education.

Later, Iversen taught a mid-career development program, "which brought 500 senior officials from Federal, state and local governments to Syracuse to study public administration," at the Maxwell School of Syracuse University."

== Attention from FBI ==
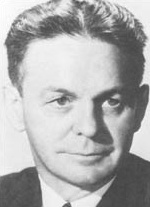
William C. Sullivan reported "no identifiable derogatory information" against Iversen in FBI files

In 1959, FBI associate director William C. Sullivan submitted a nine-page internal memo with book review of The Communists and the Schools to Alan Harnden Belmont. A "Central Research Section" of the FBI had analyzed the book and found:

Iversen minimizes communist influence on schools and concludes that communists have contributed little or nothing to American philosophy of education and seem to have left even less impression on educational methods. By implication, book is critical of various aspects of the operation of loyalty-security programs as well as congressional and state investigating committees. Nonderogatory references to the Director appear on pages 282 and 308 ... Recommendations ... 2. That this book be referred to the Internal Security, Subversive Control, Espionage, and Employees Security Sections in view of mention in the book of substantive cases pertaining to those sections.

Sullivan noted, "There is no identifiable derogatory information regarding Iversen in Bureau files."

== Personal life and death ==
Iversen married Mary Drake; they had two sons.

Iversen died age 68 on September 28, 1988, of stomach cancer at his home in Syracuse, New York.

== Works ==
Iversen's PhD dissertation at Iowa State, published in January 1951, was entitled Morris Hillquit: American Social Democrat: A Study of the American Left from Haymarket to the New Deal. The 445 page manuscript, never published in book form by a commercial publisher, is available in print-on-demand form from the academic publisher ProQuest.

Iversen's principal work, The Communists and the Schools formed part of a Fund for the Republic series on "Communism in American Life". Clinton Rossiter oversaw the series, which also included The Roots of American Communism by Theodore Draper (1957). The book starts in 1919 and ends in the 1950s and spends considerable time on the Teachers Union, Local 5 of the American Federation of Teachers in New York City. It received reviews in Kirkus Reviews, New York Times, American Historical Review, The Saturday Review, and National Review magazines among others.

His writings include:

- "Review" in Mississippi Valley Historical Review (1950)
- The Schools and the Communists (1957)
- The Communists and the Schools (1959)
- Everyone His Own Historian (1960) with Wallace F. Workmaster
- "The Peace Corps: A New Learning Situation" in The Modern Language Journal (1963)
- MIDSIM: The Maxwell International Development Simulation (1971)

== Legacy ==
Iversen's book The Communists and the Schools continues to serve as source for books on academic freedom in 20th-Century American history, including Reds at the Blackboard by Clarence Taylor High Priests of Democracy by Marjorie Heins, and Many are the Crimes by Ellen Schrecker.

== See also ==
- Fund for the Republic
- Clinton Rossiter
- Theodore Draper
