= Abraham Lefkowitz =

American labor union leader and teacher

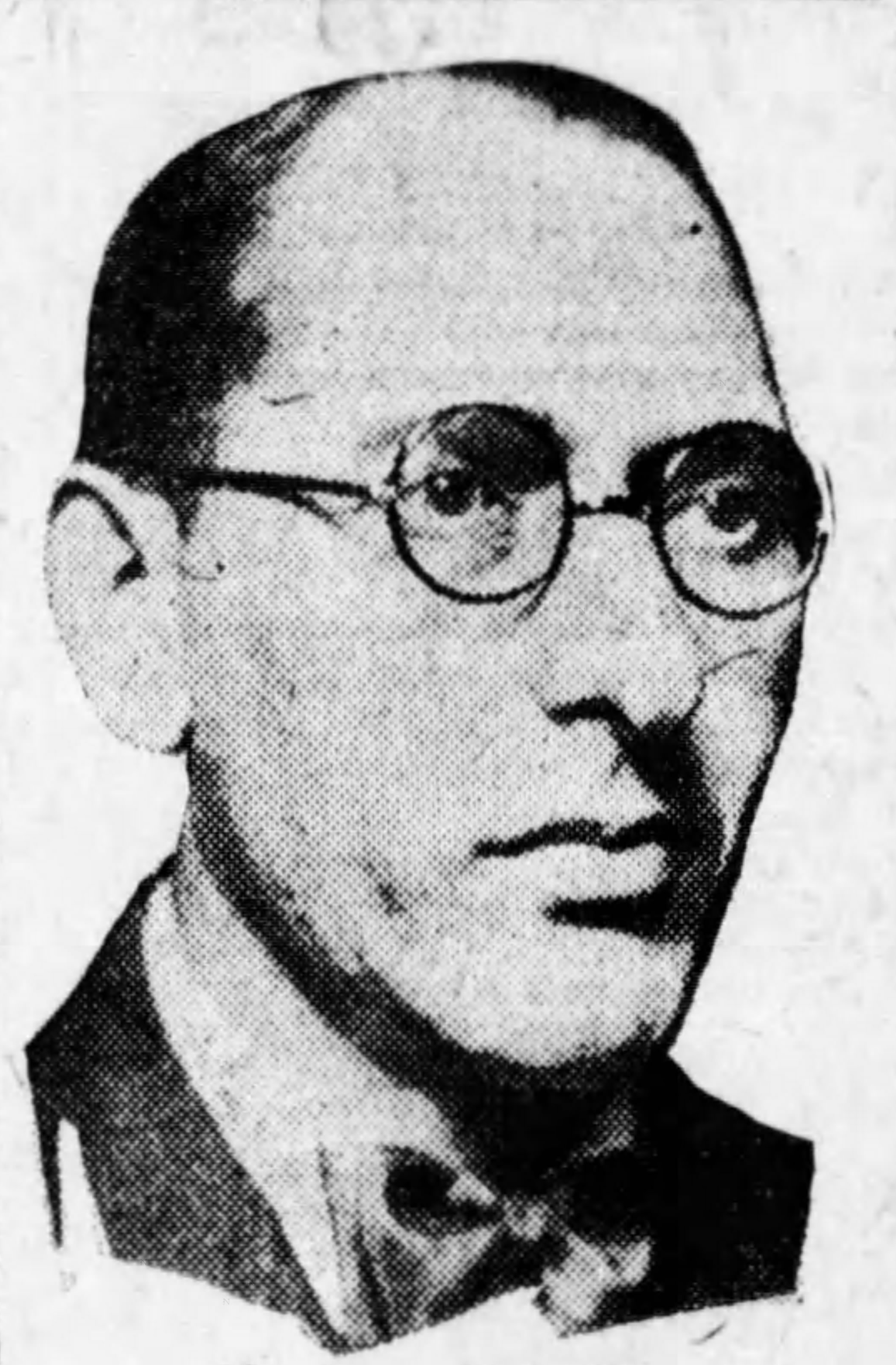
Lefkowitz c. 1926

Abraham Lefkowitz (October 17, 1884 in Revish, Hungary – November 7, 1956 in New York City, U.S.) was a co-founder of the American Federation of Teachers, of the New York City Teachers Union in 1916 and the New York City Teachers Guild, which broke off from the Teachers Union in 1935. For both the Teachers Union and Teachers Guild, he served as legislative representative to relevant New York city and state government bodies.

Lefkowitz studied at City College of New York (Bachelor of Arts, 1904) and New York University (Master of Arts, 1907 and Ph.D., 1914). He taught in the New York City public school system starting in 1903, including at DeWitt Clinton High School and the High School of Commerce. He also served as the principal of Samuel J. Tilden High School from 1938 to 1955. When he taught at DeWitt Clinton High School, he served as a mentor to future congressman Vito Marcantonio, who he remembered as an eager and excellent student, “always discussing world affairs, politics, and labor conditions.”

== See also ==
- New York City Teachers Union
- New York City Teachers Guild
- American Federation of Teachers
- Henry Linville
- Charles J. Hendley
