= Teachers Union =

Former New York City labor union for teachers

Teachers Union (TU)
- New York City Teachers Union – Local 5, AFT
- Founded: 1916
- Dissolved: 1964
- Location: United States of America
- Key people: Henry Linville, Abraham Lefkowitz (co-founders)
- Publication: New York Teacher
- Affiliations: American Federation of Teachers (AFT) (1916–1940)

The New York City Teachers Union or "TU" (1916–1964) was the first New York labor union for teachers, formed as "AFT Local 5" of the American Federation of Teachers, which found itself hounded throughout its history due largely to co-membership of many of its members in the Communist Party USA (CPUSA).

== History ==
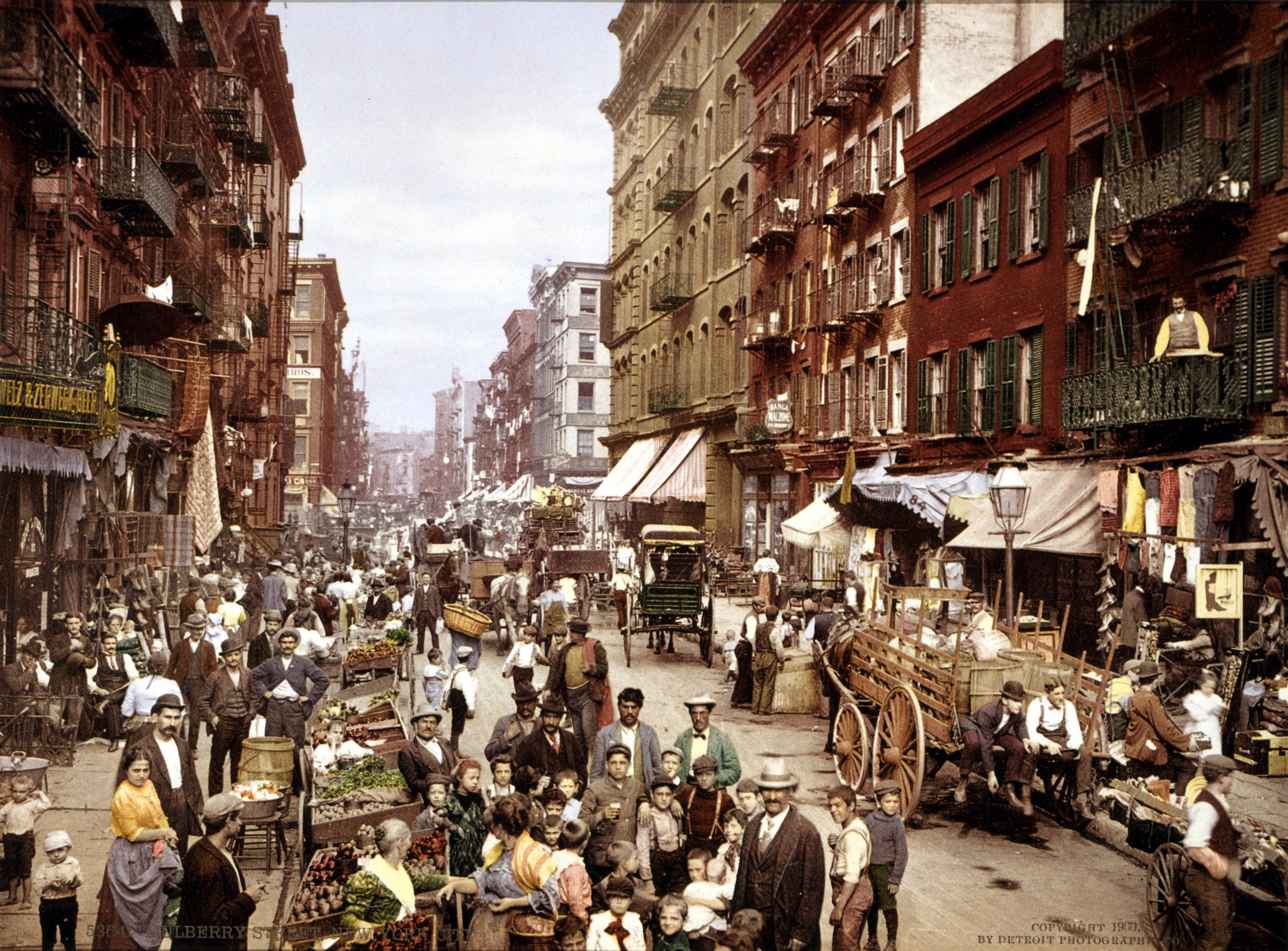
Mulberry Street, on the Lower East Side of New York City in 1900, not long before the TU formed

=== 1910s ===
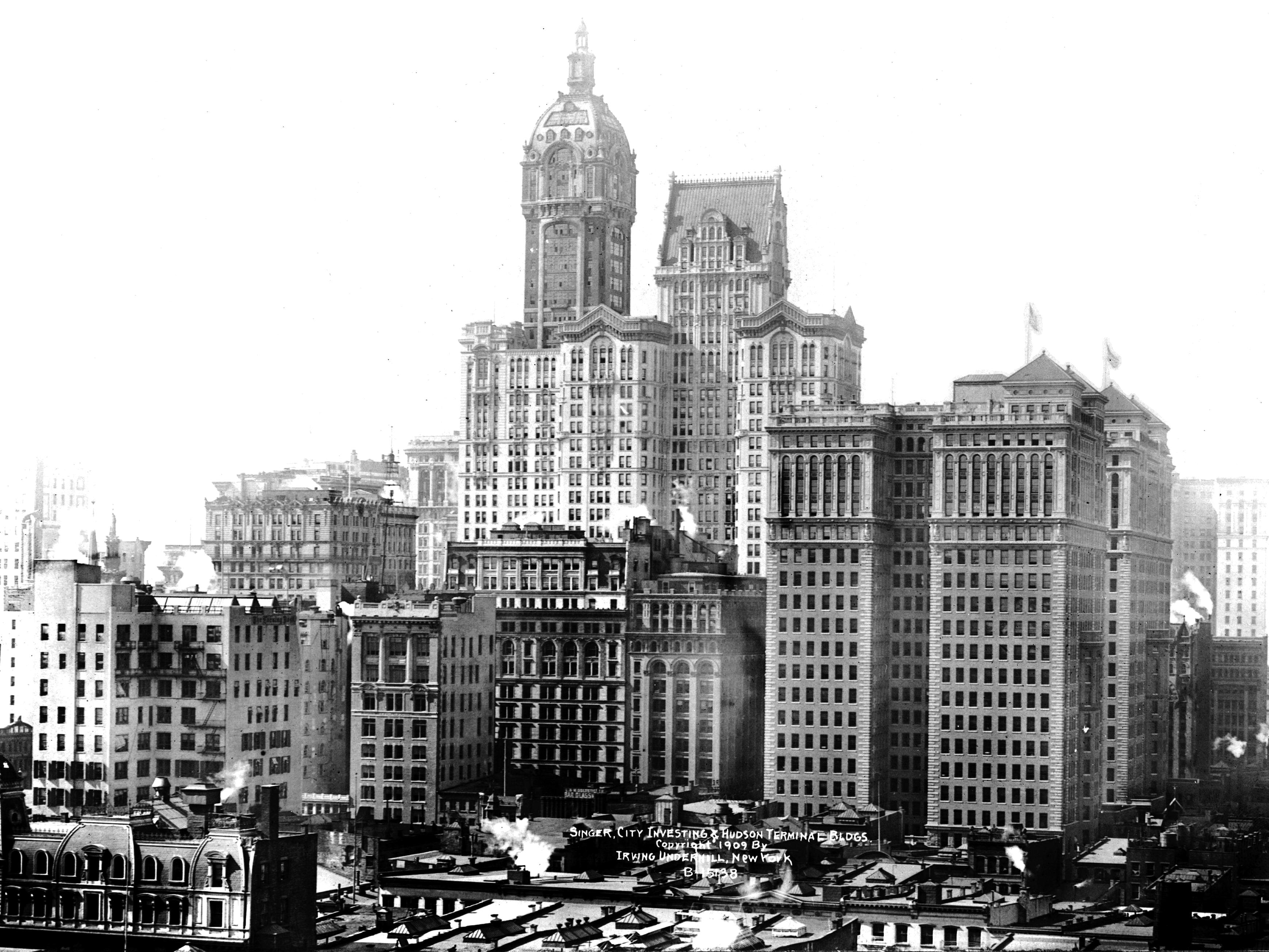
New York City's Singer Building was the world's tallest building in 1908, shortly before the TU formed.

In 1916, the New York City Teachers Union formed. That same year, it received a charter to join the American Federation of Teachers as "AFT Local 5" (often cited simply as "Local 5").

Its principal co-founders were Henry Linville (a Harvard-educated, Socialist, pacifist biology teacher) and Abraham Lefkowitz (a New York University-educated academic). From 1916 to 1935, Linville served as president and Lefkowitz as vice president and legislative expert. Their top agenda for the TU were: 1) recognition for teachers as professionals, 2) better salaries for teachers, 3) respect for teachers by administrators, and 4) academic freedom (including protection from loyalty oaths).

In 1919, AFT and TU leaders resisted the Red Scare that targeted teachers and union organizers.

=== 1920s ===
The Communist Party (Majority Group) was a contender for control of the TU during the 1920s

In the 1920s, the TU sought to gain increases in teacher salaries and pensions, smaller sizes for classroom, tenure for teachers, and more aid from the State of New York.

In the mid-1920s, political factions appeared within the TU, of which the most prominent were communist factions.

During the 1920s, under the legal name Workers Party of America, the CPUSA became active in education. (The Communists split several times during the 1920s, e.g., Communist Party (Majority Group), until it received full alignment with the Comintern in 1929.) First, it addressed adult education (largely for non-native speaker) with workers' schools, focused on New York City with the New York Workers School. Concurrently, the CPUSA began a campaign to gain control of the Teachers Union.

In 1923, a "Research Study Group" formed, affiliated with the outside Educational Workers International, itself formed by the Red International of Labor Groups, in turn affiliated with the Communist International ("Comintern"). Heading the Research Study Group was TU secretary (and CPUSA member) Benjamin Mandel (later director of research for the House Un-American Activities Committee or HUAC); members (not yet split into two rival communist parties) included: Ben Davidson, Bertram Wolfe, Jacob Lind, Rachel Ragozin, Jack Hardy (party name of Dale Zysman), Sarah Golden, Clara Reibert, Abraham Zitron, and Isidore Begun. By 1925, they had emerged as a vociferous faction with the TU (as Linville attested to the AFT in 1935). When Joseph Stalin ousted Jay Lovestone as head of the CPUSA, Lovestone's followers in the TU formed a "Progressive Group" against a "Rank and File Group" that remained loyal to the CPUSA. Progressive Group members included Mandel, Davidson, and Wolfe.

=== 1930s ===
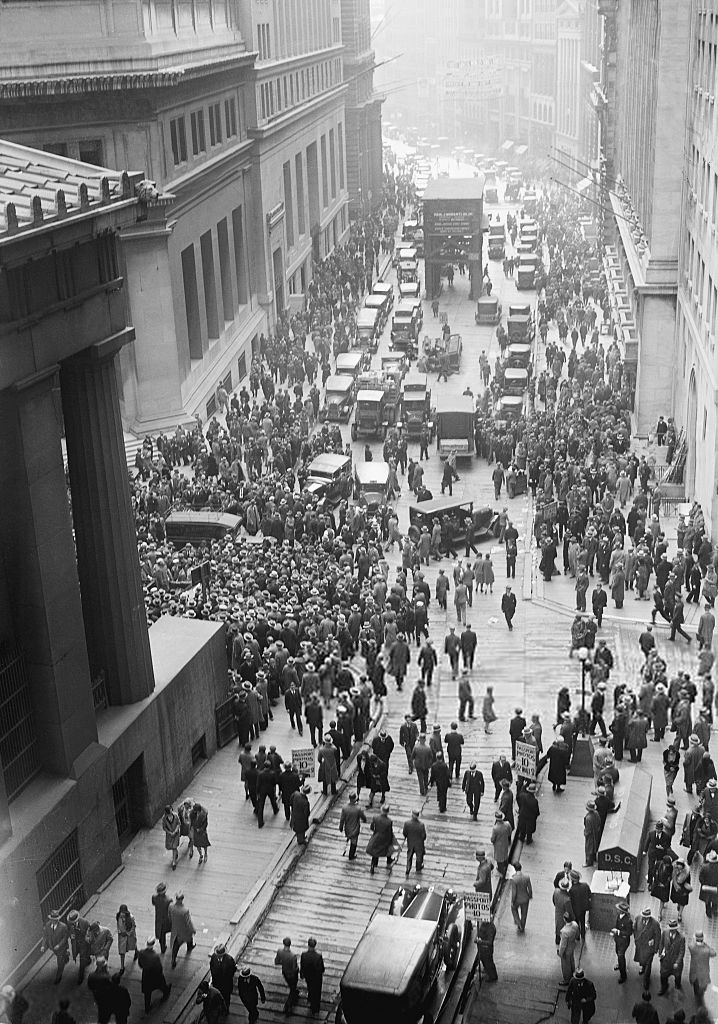
The TU's communist membership grew after the 1929 crash (here, crowd gathers at Wall Street and Broad Street).

With the Great Depression, however, CPUSA membership grew, reflected in TU membership by 1932.

Another split occurred when leadership strove to keep TU membership limited to full-time public school teachers, while other members began advocating to open membership to substitute teachers, private school teachers, and (after 1929) teachers in the New Deal Work Projects Administration. In the 1930s during the Great Depression, the CPUSA began to make headway in its control as its members struggled internally with less leftist, more liberal fellow members of the Teachers Union.

On October 27, 1932, the TU administration choose a Committee of Five to deliberate on five members of the "Rank and File" group (Joseph Leboit, Clara Reiber, Alice Citron, Abraham Zitron, and Isidore Begun) and one member of the "Progressive" group (Bertram Wolfe). In a counter-attack, the two communist factions made their own minority report (written by Begun, Davidson, Florence Gitlin, and David M. Wittes) on the TU's administration. On April 29, 1933, John Dewey delivered the Committee of Five's report, which called for investigation into the two groups and whether a new local might form free from communist influence. By 1935, the committee had determined that the TU was helpless to rid itself of communist factions; it could not muster the votes needed.

By 1935, thanks in part to the "United Front" policy of the Comintern, the CPUSA gained control of the Teachers Union, which it held through 1938. The CPUSA then tried to gain control of its parent, the American Federation of Teachers (whose president at that time was Jerome Davis, later involved in a sensational libel suit). At the same time, the CPUSA tried to mobilize Teachers Union members into joined various United Front-style group, including:

1. "Intellectual" fronts, e.g., the Jefferson School of Social Science
2. "Friends" groups, e.g., Friends of the Soviet Union, National Council of American–Soviet Friendship
3. "Anti-fascist" groups, e.g., American League Against War and Fascism, American Medical Bureau, Joint Anti-Fascist Refugee Committee
4. Special-interest groups for African-Americans, foreign-born Americans, sharecroppers, scientists
5. "Defense" organizations, e.g., International Labor Defense

During an August 1935 national convention of the AFT, the TU administration asked for a referendum to reorganize, voted down 100 to 79. As a result, TU co-founders Linville and Lefkowitz led some 800 of some 2,000 members out of the TU to form the New York City Teachers Guild.

In 1936, leadership of the American Federation of Labor (AFL), parent of the American Federation of Teachers (AFL) (parent to the TU), recommended that the AFL revoke the TU's charter as Local 5, AFT. The AFT (whose president was then Jerome Davis) disregarded the AFL's recommendation.

In 1937, Abe Meeropol published the poem "Strange Fruit" under the title "Bitter Fruit" in 1937 in The New York Teacher, a union magazine of the Teachers Union.

On March 15, 1938, the Greater New York Centra Trades and Labor Council suspended to the TU's membership, while the Joint Committee of Teachers Organizations (JCTO) of New York City expelled the TU.

=== 1940s ===
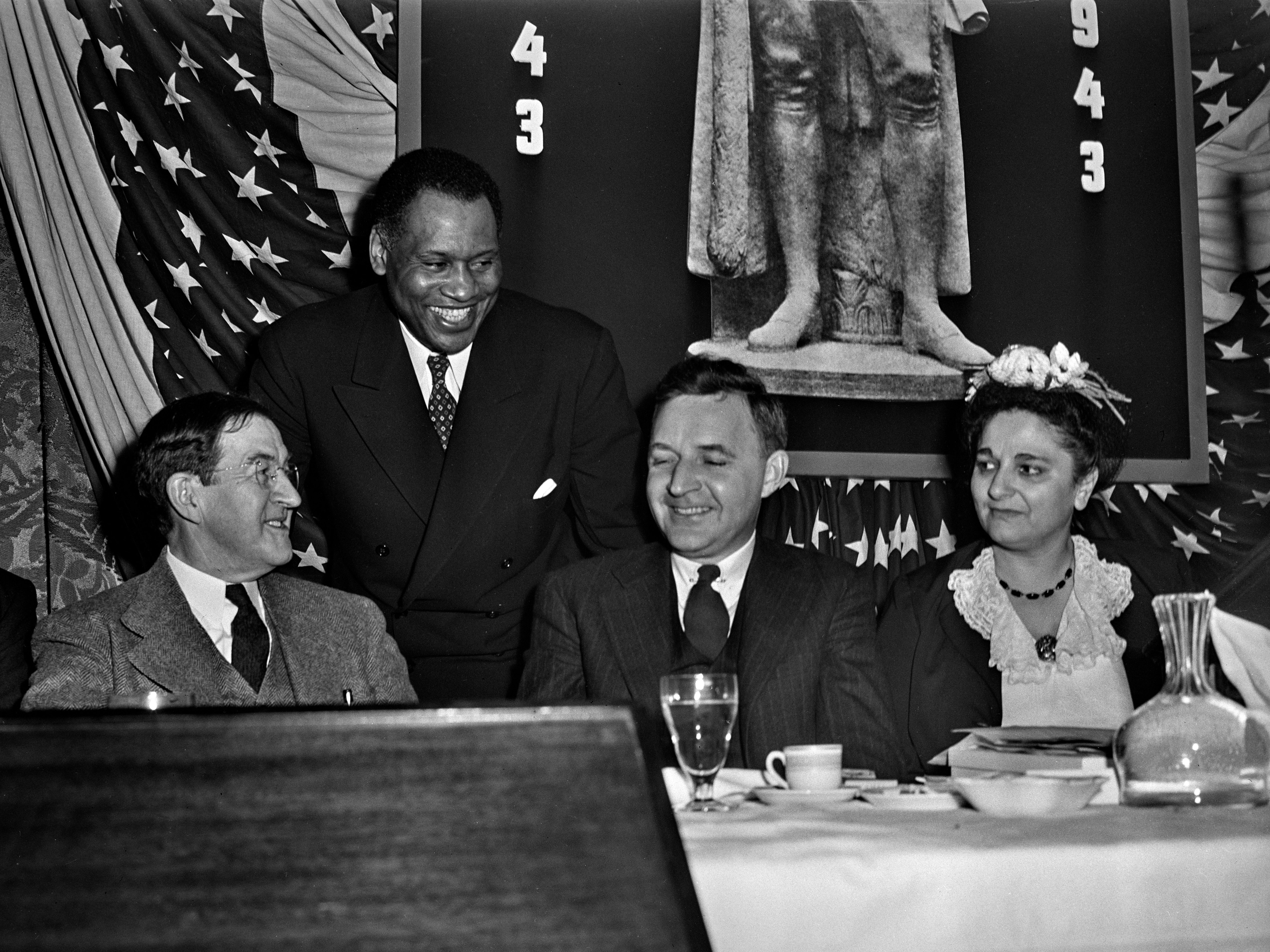
Charles J. Hendley, Paul Robeson, Julius Emspak and Bella Dodd at a TU luncheon at the Commodore Hotel in New York City, April 17, 1943

In August 1941, the AFT revoked the TU's charter as Local 5, AFT. The TU then became Local 555 of the United Public Workers (UPW), affiliate of the AFL's national rival, the Congress of Industrial Organizations (CIO).

After World War II, the Teachers Union found itself attacked by "Hearst press, the American Legion, and the rural-dominated state legislatures."

=== 1950s ===
In February 1950, the CIO expelled the UPW (thus also the TU) from membership. In 1952, the TU withdrew from the UPW.

=== 1960s ===
In June 1964, the TU agreed to dissolve during an annual convention.

== Assessments ==
In his 1959 book The Communists & the Schools, Robert W. Iversen noted that the Great Depression had caused impoverished families to send their children to "free municipal colleges" (e.g., City College of New York), where the Young Communist League of America worked to recruit them or steer them toward YCL-CPUSA-controlled fronts (e.g., the American Student Union). Nevertheless, Iversen concluded that communists within academia "tended to be concentrated in a few areas, leaving the schools as a whole relatively unaffected." Further, their active period was largely only the 1930s and "varied widely in the degree of their commitment and involvement in the movement." During the 1940s, graduates tended to move to the suburbs and reject communism. As for the vehemence of the 1940s and 1950s attacks on the Teachers Union, Iversen ascribes such to "a bewildering web of persistent patriots who have made careers of dossier-building" at home in reaction to the spread of Communist nations abroad (e.g., Soviet atomic capability and the victory of the Chinese Communist Party, both in 1949). Ultimately, Iversen concluded that American students were not communist "products" of indoctrination in the American school system.

In 1985, the University of the State of New York noted:

Teachers' unions, including the New York City Teachers Union, founded in 1916, and its successor in the American Federation of Teachers, worked not only to improve wages and benefits, but also to promote measures they believed would benefit schools and pupils. It was not until the 1960s, however, that teacher unions generally attained the status of collective bargaining agents.

In his 2013 book Reds at the Blackboard, Clarence Taylor distinguishes between "anti-Communist" and "revisionist" histories of the TU. He questions:

The evidence is clear that members of the TU, especially those in the Communist Party, supported Communist Party policies. But does the evidence show that the TU was a tool of the Communist Party, unconcerned with the interest of teachers, or did the union act independently of the Communist Party?

Taylor's response is that both viewpoints are "too simplistic." Instead, he argues, there is a need to appreciate the TU's advocacy for "social movement unionism," which manifested itself in the TU's alliances with unions, parents, civil rights organizations, and political parties. The TU's primary objectives were to overcome barriers to education, which include racial discrimination and poverty – in addition to higher salaries and better working conditions for teachers. Ultimately, he concludes, the TU created a "unique type of unionism that was in the forefront for civil rights and academic freedom."

In 2018, Stephen Brier assessed:

The union that later became the United Federation of Teachers (UFT) would literally grow out of the shell of the older Teachers' Guild (TG), a social-democratic split off from the more radical New York Teachers' Union (TU), which Communist Party activists had helped reorganize as a CIO union during the Great Depression. The early UFT, like its Teachers' Guild ancestor, succeeded, in large measure, as a result of the evisceration of the Teachers' Union, which had been expelled from the AFT in 1940 and effectively destroyed in the late 1950s amidst a swelling chorus of McCarthyite red-baiting, propagated in large part by TG leaders.

The TG and UFT helped quell the social movement unionism of the TU.

== Publications ==
The TU published New York Teacher.

== People ==
The TU was a client of Harold I. Cammer.

=== Leadership ===
- Henry Linville
- Abraham Lefkowitz
- Benjamin Mandel
- Charles J. Hendley
- Bella Dodd
- Dale Zysman

=== Members ===
- Irving Adler
- David Ayman
- Morris U. Cohen
- Ben Davidson
- Myra Page
- Bertram Wolfe

== Variations on name ==
- Teachers Union of the City of New York

== See also ==
- Teachers Guild
- American Federation of Teachers
- United Public Workers of America
- United Federation of Teachers
