= Charles Cogen =

Charles Cogen, president, New York's United Federation of Teachers, Local 2 of the American Federation of Teachers (AFL-CIO), 1963; photo courtesy of Walter Reuther Library, Wayne State University

Charles Cogen (October 31, 1903 – February 18, 1998) was president of New York City's United Federation of Teachers (UFT) (1960–1964) and subsequently, the American Federation of Teachers (AFT) (1964–1968). During Cogen's tenure the teachers' union demonstrated a militancy that had not previously been apparent, and was at odds with the image of the teacher as quiet civil servant. That strikes were technically illegal under the state's Condon-Wadlin Act did not deter Cogen from leading citywide walkouts that resulted in significant economic and professional advances for those he represented. To those who argued that striking teachers set a poor example for students, Cogen responded that such teachers were models of courageous citizenship. Similarly, Cogen scoffed at efforts to characterize teacher walkouts as subverting the public interest: "Who is to say what the public interest is?"

There had never been a teacher strike in New York City prior to 1960 (although Cogen threatened one in 1959 when he was leader of the Teachers' Guild) During the four years that Cogen was president of the UFT, teachers struck twice and came within 24 hours of a third. Each such crisis involved confrontations with New York City's superintendent of schools and the city's mayor. Occasionally, the state's commissioner of education and governor were also involved. These were people with national profiles, and consequently, Cogen also became a national figure. This proved to be of substantial assistance to him when he ran for the presidency of the AFT.

== Early life ==
Born Charles Cohen on New York's Lower East Side, Cogen attended union rallies with his father Joseph, a garment worker. He graduated from Boys High School in Brooklyn, and earned a scholarship to Cornell University where he studied economics, earning his degree in 1924. While working as an elementary school teacher, he pursued a law degree at Fordham University in the evening. Cogen obtained his law degree in 1927 and left teaching to practice labor law three years later at which time he changed his name to Cogen. In 1930, he also married lawyer Tess Schnittkramer, who later became a professor at Pace College (now Pace University).

Cogen's law practice foundered during the Depression, and he decided to forsake it in 1933, but not before earning a master's degree in economics from Columbia University. He returned to teaching, accepting a "teacher in training" position in Queens. It paid $4.50/day with no benefits. Cogen worked his way up to a regular position at Grover Cleveland High School in Queens where he worked for five years, then moved on to The Bronx High School of Science where he was a faculty member for thirteen years. He completed his career in the classroom as chairman of the social studies department at Brooklyn's Bay Ridge High School.

== Union activist ==
=== Teachers' union, 1960 ===
Cogen was elected president of the New York Teachers Guild in 1959. The Guild was one of many competing teacher organizations vying to represent the city's 44,000 teachers. In 1960, Cogen merged the Guild with the High School Teachers Association, forming the new United Federation of Teachers (UFT), and he was elected its first president. Cogen immediately made it known that the teacher pay scale and working conditions were unacceptable. Starting salary for teachers in New York was $4,800/year, and they topped out at $8,300. Teachers were also expected to do routine clerical work as part of their duties. In addition, Cogen was eager to demonstrate that his union, an affiliate of the AFL-CIO, would deliver concrete results to its members by resorting to traditional labor tactics such as strikes. This differentiated the UFT and its parent organization, the American Federation of Teachers, from the larger, less militant National Education Association (NEA).

On November 7 Cogen called a one-day strike of New York's teachers, their first ever. An estimated 15,000 teachers refused to report for work, and the school superintendent, John J. Theobald (1904–1985), formally suspended 4,600 teachers he identified as strikers. That the strike was illegal according to the provisions of the state's Condon-Wadlin Act had not deterred Cogen, who insisted that the administration would not fire ten to twenty thousand teachers, especially when teachers were in short supply. Although, the strike was called off after one day on the advice of other local AFL-CIO unions with whom Cogen's UFT was affiliated, subsequent negotiations won for teachers the right to a collective bargaining election in which the UFT was victorious. In addition, the union was allowed to have dues payments automatically deducted from paychecks. Progress was also made in securing duty-free lunch periods for elementary school teachers and sick pay for substitutes. The administration's suspensions of teachers were cancelled after the settlement was finalized.

=== The strike of 1962 ===
In the spring of 1962, contract talks between the city and the teachers' union broke down, leading to another walkout. The issue was money with the union demanding salary increases totaling $53 million and the city offering only $28 million (equivalent to a raise of $700/yr. if the increase was applied to all teachers across the board). The strike vote was close: 2,544 in favor; 2,231 opposed. The walkout of 20,000 teachers on April 11 was effective, however, completely shutting 26 buildings, and seriously disrupting classes at virtually all locations. School administrators quickly invoked the Condon-Wadlin Act, obtaining a court injunction that ordered teachers back to work. After meeting with union officials, Cogen announced that teachers “would comply with the slave labor injunction.” Throughout his career, Cogen made it plain that he regarded laws forbidding strikes by public employees to be unconstitutional.

On April 13, New York City mayor Robert F. Wagner Jr. (1910–1991) and New York State governor Nelson Rockefeller (1908–1979) announced an agreement that would provide an additional $13 million for New York City Schools, allowing increased funding for teacher salaries. The final agreement established a new teacher pay scale of $5,300 - $9,970, and also provided teachers with a grievance procedure that allowed settlement through binding arbitration.

=== Crisis of 1963 ===
Negotiations between the teachers' union and the school board during spring 1963 were aimed at reaching agreement on a new contract in the fall. Cogen was insistent that the teachers be offered a significant pay increase. He was open to the idea of a multi-year contract but demanded that teachers receive a pay increase in the first year. Administration, led by new superintendent Calvin E. Gross (1920–1987), was intent on opening schools on time and preventing a strike. Gross announced that he would enforce the law by invoking Condon-Wadlin if necessary. Cogen vowed to defy any injunction this time, conducting a strike from prison if it came to that. The union initially asked for salary increases totaling $56 million spread over three years. Administration, after first arguing that no funds were available, settled on an offer of $15 million as part of a two-year contract with the salary increase paid in the second year. This was unacceptable to Cogen, whose position was supported overwhelmingly by a delegate vote of 1,500–17. The union risked paying a high price for its defiance. New York State Commissioner of Education James E. Allen Jr. (1911–1971) supported Supt. Gross by threatening to cancel the licenses of striking teachers. In addition, the union did not have a strike fund at its disposal to withstand a lengthy walkout. Furthermore, there were some who questioned the ethical conduct of striking teachers who were, in effect, providing students with a lesson in law breaking. Cogen responded by arguing that, “Civic courage and idealism should be taught by those who practice it."

On September 8, the day before the scheduled teacher walkout (which coincided with the start of the school year), an agreement was announced. A mediation panel appointed by Mayor Wagner had reached a settlement with the teachers' union. The agreement called for a two-year contract with raises totaling over $20 million. Teachers would see part of the increase in their April paychecks. For most teachers, the raise would amount to approximately $580. Several non-economic accomplishments were among the most popular presented to the teachers by Cogen: an improved grievance procedure, the right to hold union meetings in schools, a requirement that school principals give teachers notice of any complaint, and the right of teachers to be accompanied by counsel at hearings.

=== AFT president ===
In 1964, American Federation of Teacher (AFT) president Carl J. Megel (1900–1992) announced his retirement. Megel, in office since 1952, had been the union's first full-time president. During this period, membership had tripled from 39,000 to 109,000. In a closely contested election, Cogen defeated Gary, Indiana, teacher union leader Charles O. Smith Jr. by a vote of 1,023–993. Smith was Megel's choice, but Cogen had several advantages: greater name recognition, a stronger reputation for militancy, and a unified caucus supporting his candidacy. In the end, this was enough to overcome some members' fears that Cogen's election would mean organizational domination by New York. Cogen's presidency, which lasted until 1968, saw a continuation of AFT's growth as the union conducted many successful organizing drives throughout the country.

== Later years ==
After retirement, Cogen continued to serve as an advisor to other union leaders, and was a board member on the Jewish Labor Committee, the Americans for Democratic Action, and the U.S. National Commission for UNESCO. In 1991, Cogen moved to Washington, D.C., where his son Edward resided. Even in his last years, Cogen retained an active interest in public affairs, publicizing causes which he continued to champion, hoping to spur others to action. Standing 5 feet 2 inches, and possessed of a naturally mild manner, Cogen's union militancy may have seemed incongruous to many who were used to viewing teachers as docile civil servants. Cogen's legacy was to overturn this preconception and contribute to a new understanding of educators as professionals whose subservience could no longer be taken for granted by society.
