= Nat LaCour =

American labor union leader and teacher

Nat LaCour (February 11, 1938 - October 10, 2020) was an American labor union leader and teacher. From 1971 to 1998, he was president of United Teachers of New Orleans (UTNO), American Federation of Teachers Local 527, the longest serving president in the local's history. Under his leadership, UTNO became the largest teachers union in the Deep South, eventually representing more than 7000 teachers, paraprofessionals, school secretaries, and administrative clericals.

Originally a school teacher with the New Orleans public schools, he signed up as a member of AFT Local 527 on his first day of teaching in 1961. In the middle of the decade, seeing how some of his fellow teachers were mistreated, he became more of an activist. In 1969, he was elected vice-president of the local, and in 1971, he was elected president. In 1972 he engineered along with Cheryl Epling, president of the rival and mostly White Orleans Educators' Association (OEA) and Bob Crowley, the Executive Director of the NEA affiliate in New Orleans, a merger with the National Education Association local to form United Teachers of New Orleans (UTNO). In 1974, UTNO became the first teachers' union in the Deep South to win a contract without the protection of a state public employee collective bargaining law.

LaCour was elected a vice president of the AFT, and in 1998 was elected to the newly formed position of executive vice president of the union. In 2004, LaCour was elected secretary-treasurer of the union after the retirement of AFT president Sandra Feldman and the election of secretary-treasurer Edward J. McElroy as president. The same year, he was elected to the executive council of the AFL-CIO.

LaCour is a founding member of the National Board for Professional Teaching Standards, and serves on the board of directors of the Albert Shanker Institute, National Democratic Institute, the A. Philip Randolph Institute and the Coalition of Black Trade Unionists.

On February 11, 2008, LaCour announced he would retire as Secretary-Treasurer of the AFT at its regularly scheduled biennial convention in Chicago in July 2008.
