= Archbishop McNicholas High School =

McNicholas High School
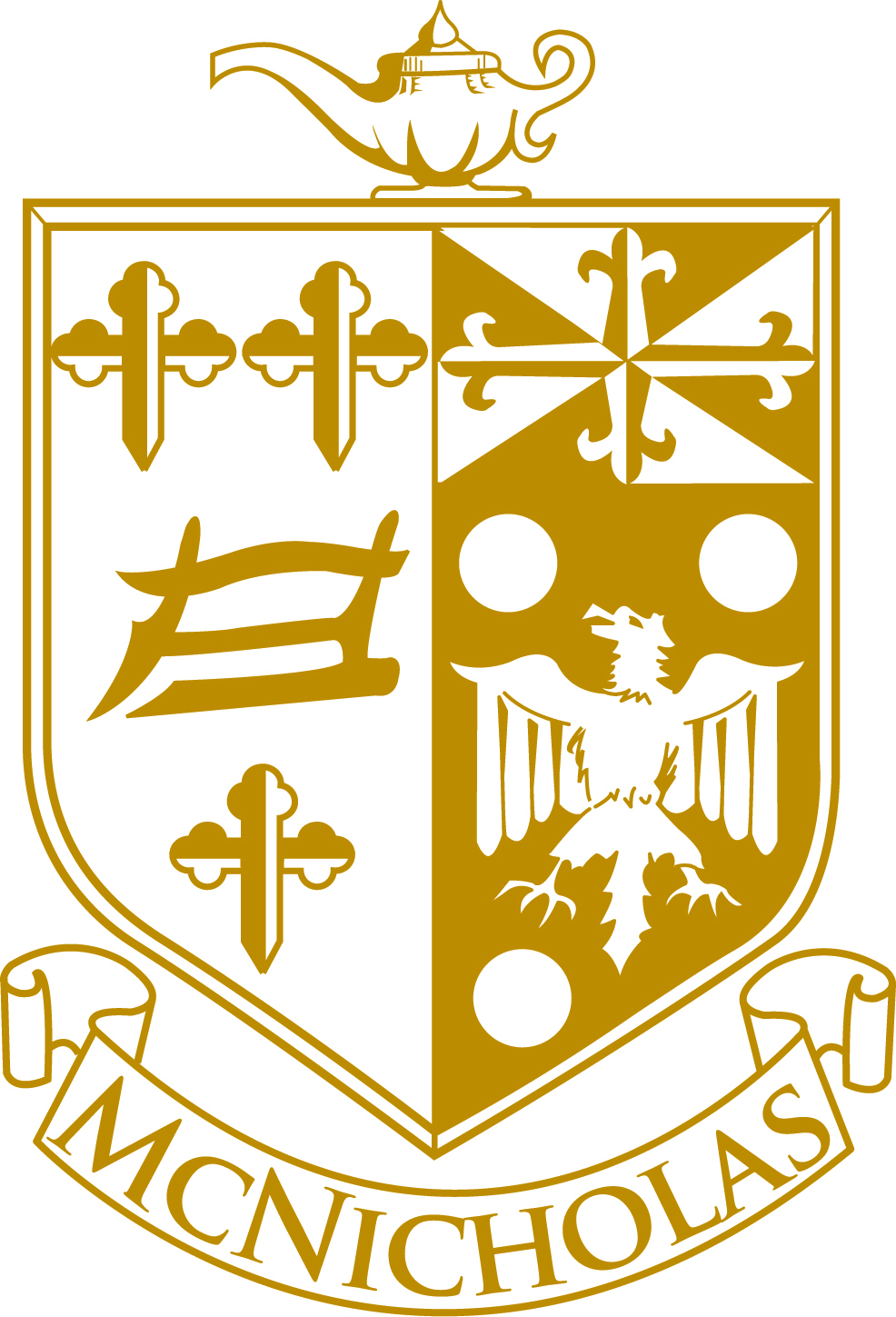
- Crest of Archbishop McNicholas High School

Location
- 6536 Beechmont Ave. Cincinnati, Ohio 45230; United States; 39°5′10″N 84°22′37″W

Information
- Type: Private, parochial, archdiocesan
- Motto: That Youth May Attain Full Stature in Christ
- Religious affiliation: Roman Catholic
- Established: 1915 (St. Joseph Academy); 1951 (Archbishop McNicholas High School)
- Authority: Roman Catholic Archdiocese of Cincinnati
- School code: GZKX
- President: Bob Noll III
- Principal: Paul Romolo
- Grades: 9–12
- Gender: Co-ed
- Enrollment: 705
- Student to teacher ratio: 11:1
- Language: English
- Schedule: 7:40-2:40
- Hours in school day: 7
- Colors: Kelly green and black
- Slogan: Find Your Brilliance
- Athletics conference: Greater Catholic League Central
- Nickname: McNick
- Team name: Rockets
- Rival: Badin High School (Hamilton, Ohio) Alter High School (Kettering, Ohio) Roger Bacon High School
- Accreditation: Ohio Catholic School Accrediting Association
- ACT average: 29
- Newspaper: McNicholas Milestone
- School fees: Totaling Around $1,165 Annually
- Annual tuition: $12,395 (Excluding Fees)
- Revenue: $12,475,549
- Advanced Placement: 19 AP Classes Offered
- Website: http://www.mcnhs.org/

Archbishop McNicholas High School is a coeducational Catholic school in Mount Washington, Cincinnati, Ohio.

== History ==
The school was opened in 1951 and named in honor of John T. McNicholas, a former Archbishop of Cincinnati. The geographic district of the school is on the eastern side of Hamilton County and extends into Clermont and Brown Counties.

In 1915, St. Joseph Academy, an all-girls academy, was opened as a day and boarding school operated by the Sisters of St. Joseph of Medaille. In 1950, Archbishop McNicholas designated the academy would become the first co-ed parochial high school in Cincinnati. McNicholas died before the school was opened and his successor, Archbishop Karl J. Alter approved on January 15, 1951, that the school be named for McNicholas.

The school was purchased from the Sisters of Saint Joseph of Medaille by the Archdiocese of Cincinnati in 1998. The oldest building on the McNicholas campus is the St. Joseph Academy building, now called the Convent, which celebrated its 100th year of use in 2014. The building is home to business offices, a chapel, and the World Languages classrooms.

McNicholas High School's Penn Station Stadium was completed in the fall of 2018 as part of the "Paradise" athletic complex. The stadium features synthetic turf, an all-weather track, and a fixed seating capacity of 2,250, with additional capacity available throughout the concourse. In addition to the stadium and track, McNicholas's "Paradise" is home to baseball and softball fields, a gymnasium, weight room, two additional practice fields, and a community pavilion.

== Academics ==
The curriculum is accredited by the Ohio Department of Education and the Ohio Catholic School Accrediting Association. 98% of the students attending McNicholas High School further their education in post-secondary schools and colleges. It is required that students have two semester-length theology classes every year at McNicholas, as well as community service hours. 53% of the students actively attending McNicholas High School take or have taken one or more of the 19 Advanced Placement classes offered. The science department at McNicholas received the Ohio Governor's Award for STEM Excellence for over 30 years. McNicholas has partnered with over 5 universities for College Credit Plus programs, offering 16 College Credit Plus (CCP) courses.

== Athletics ==
=== Ohio High School Athletic Association State Championships ===
- Men's soccer – 1984
- Baseball – 1998
- Men's Golf - 2016
- Women's Basketball – 2001
- Women's Soccer - 2014
- Women’s Volleyball - 2025, 2026
- Men's Volleyball – 2024, 2025

=== District and Regional Championships ===
- Men's Basketball (District)1974, 1981, 1983, 1984, 1985, 1991, 1992, 1993, 1995, 1998, 1999 (Regional) 1974, 1984, 1985, 1991, 1993, 1995
- Women's Basketball (District) 2001, 2002, 2003, 2007 (Regional) 2001
- Men's Volleyball (District) 2004, 2006, 2007, 2008, 2009, 2013, 2015, 2016 (Regional) 2008, 2014, 2016
- Women's Volleyball (District) 1975, 1976, 2003, 2004, 2005, 2006, 2007, 2012, 2013, 2014
- Women's Soccer District 2013,2014,2016
- Men’s Soccer (District) 2022
- Men's Track and Field, Shot Put (District) 2022
- Men's Track and Field, 400m (State) 2024
- Men's Track and Field, 4x400m relay (State) 2023

=== National Championships ===
- Girls Dance Team - 2008, 2009, 2011, 2013, 2016

== Notable alumni ==
Notable alumni include:

- Larry Cipa (1969) - football player (NFL)
- Kevin Huber (2004) - football player, Cincinnati Bengals
- Tom Mooney (1970) - educator, President of the Ohio Federation of Teachers
- Jean Schmidt (1970) - former US House Representative for the second district of Ohio.
- Pat Tabler (1976) - baseball player (MLB)
- Bob Wiesenhahn (1957) - basketball player (NBA and Cincinnati Bearcats - National Championship Team)
