= Tom Mooney (educator) =

- Born: September 12, 1954
- Died: December 3, 2006 (aged 52); Columbus, Ohio, United States
- Education: Bachelor's degree
- Alma mater: Antioch College
- Occupations: Labor leader, teacher
- Known for: Presidency of Ohio Federation of Teachers
- Board member of: National Board for Professional Teaching Standards
- Spouse(s): Virginia Rhodes, Debbie Schneider
- Children: 2

Tom Mooney (September 12, 1954 – December 3, 2006) was an American labor leader and public school teacher.

== Early life ==
Mooney grew up in Cincinnati, Ohio, and graduated with a bachelor's degree from Antioch College in Yellow Springs, Ohio in 1975.

== Career ==
=== Early career ===
Mooney began his career as an educator teaching junior high school government in Cincinnati, Ohio, and quickly became active in the American Federation of Teachers local affiliate there.

=== Union work ===
Mooney was elected President of the Cincinnati Federation of Teachers, Local 1520 of the AFT, AFL-CIO, at age 24, was re-elected many times, serving from 1979 to 2000.

In 1990, Mooney was elected a vice president of the AFT. He served on the AFT's executive council, the governing body of the national union, and in 1998 became part of the council's executive committee—a body of executive council members close to the president of the AFT, which advises the president and debates and formulates policy before bringing it to the council. On the executive council, Mooney served on the human rights and community relations, organizing, and affiliate accountability committees. He was also chair of the "program and policy council" for the union's teacher division.

In 2000 he became president of the Ohio Federation of Teachers.

Mooney was member of the board of directors of the National Board for Professional Teaching Standards, and the Albert Shanker Institute. He was also a founding member of the Teacher Union Reform Network (TURN) and of what was renamed in his honor, the Mooney Institute for Teacher and Union Leadership.

Mooney's approach to teacher unionism emphasized the union's role as the professional voice of teachers. As chair of the AFT's Professional Issues Committee, Mooney remained focused on the classroom teacher's perspective and voice. He believed the union must lead reform, collaborate with the administration whenever possible, engage the adversaries of public education, but always put forward a strong teachers' voice, with bold ideas.

== Personal life ==
Mooney was married to Debbie Schneider, who lives in Washington and works for the Service Employees International Union as the director of Global Organizing Partnerships. They had a daughter, Leilah Mooney. Tom had a son, Ruairi Kevin Rhodes, from his first marriage to Virginia Rhodes. Tom had four grandchildren who were born after his death, two of whom were named after him. Thomas Mooney Joseph, Elijah Mooney Joseph, and Ronan Mooney Joseph, sons of Leilah Mooney, and Thomas Jose Rhodes Gonzalez, son of Ruairi Kevin Rhodes.

=== Death ===
Mooney died of a heart attack at his home in Columbus, Ohio. December 3, 2006.
