= Mary Cathryn Ricker =

American politician

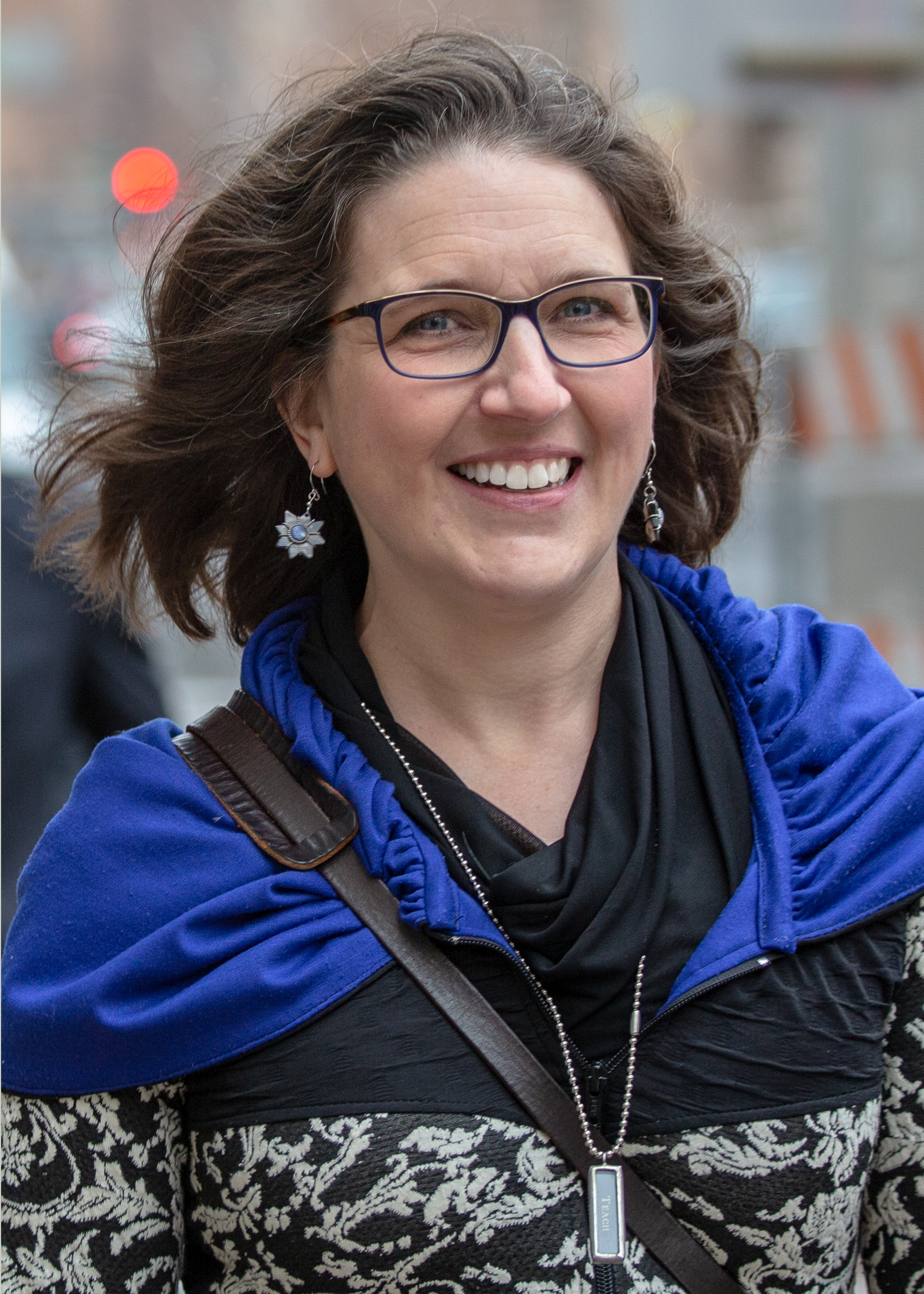

Albert Shanker Institute, Executive Director
- Preceded by: Leo Casey

Personal details
- Born: December 15, 1968 (age 57) Hibbing, Minnesota, U.S.
- Spouse: Robert Cudahy

Mary Cathryn Ricker (born December 15, 1968) is a labor leader, politician and educator in the United States, who is the current Executive Director of the Albert Shanker Institute, a nonprofit, nonpartisan organization dedicated to three themes: excellence in public education, unions as advocates for quality, and freedom of association in the public life of democracies. Its mission is to generate ideas, foster candid exchanges, and promote constructive policy proposals related to these issues. Toward these ends, ASI conducts original research, sponsors research, and organizes conferences and conversations in its three theme areas. Ricker previously served as a classroom teacher, Commissioner of Education for the State of Minnesota, as Executive Vice President of the American Federation of Teachers, and as President of the Saint Paul Federation of Teachers.

== Early life and education ==
Ricker was born and raised in Hibbing, Minnesota.

Ricker is a National Board Certified Teacher who was a classroom English teacher in middle school English/Language arts for 13 years in St. Cloud, Minnesota; Camas, Washington; and Seoul. She also taught for 5 years in Saint Paul Public Schools.

== Labor leadership ==
Ricker has experience as past President of the St. Paul Federation of Teachers from 2005 to 2014, a 4000+ member union serving the teachers and Educational Assistants in St. Paul Public Schools. In 2014, Ricker was elected Executive Vice President of the American Federation of Teachers. She also was a local delegate to the St. Paul Area Trades and Labor Assembly and served on the board of the Minnesota AFL–CIO.

== Board experience ==
Ricker was elected to the Education Minnesota Governing Board and previously served on Education Minnesota's statewide Professional Advocacy member committee. Ricker also served on the National Board for Professional Teaching Standards and as past president of the Education Minnesota Foundation for Teaching and Learning. She was Middle School Chairperson on the board of the Minnesota Council of Teachers of English.

Ricker also serves on the Board of Directors for the National Democratic Institute, Department for Professional Employees, AFL–CIO, United Way of America, and the Albert Shanker Institute.
