= United Nurses and Allied Professionals =

New England labor union

UNAP
- United Nurses and Allied Professionals
- Founded: 1998
- Headquarters: Providence, Rhode Island
- Location: United States
- Members: 6,500
- Key people: Linda McDonald, president
- Website: www.unap.org

The United Nurses and Allied Professionals (UNAP) is a labor union in the United States which represents more than 6,500 registered nurses, technologists, therapists, support staff, and other health care workers employed in Rhode Island, Vermont, and Connecticut.

== Formation ==
The origins of the United Nurses & Allied Professionals (UNAP) date back to the early 1970s, when Registered Nurses at several health care facilities in Rhode Island organized a union under the auspices of the Rhode Island State Nurses Association (RISNA). IN 1978, RISNA decided to relinquish its collective bargaining functions and encouraged its collective bargaining units to join with another union. After interviewing several unions, the roughly 400 former RISNA members chose to affiliate with the Federation of Nurses and Health Professionals (FNHP) of the American Federation of Teachers, and its state affiliate, the Rhode Island Federation of Teachers (RIFT).

Between 1978 and 1998, the FNHP successfully organized RNs and other health care workers at Memorial Hospital, Woonsocket Hospital (now Landmark Medical Center), Westerly Hospital, RI Hospital, and Fatima Hospital, bringing the RIFT’s total health membership to 3,500. Inspired by the energy of a rapidly growing union, and the urgency of a rapidly changing industry, the FNHP leaders approached the RIFT leadership with a proposal to organize their locals into a semi-autonomous health care division within the RIFT. When the RIFT rejected this option, the members of eight RIFT health care locals voted overwhelmingly to disaffiliate from the RIFT in order to concentrate their efforts and resources as an independent health care union. They called their new union the UNAP.

Not long after the formation of the UNAP, two chapters of an existing RIFT visiting nurse local also voted to leave the RIFT and join the UNAP. They were followed in 1999 by an AFT local at Brattleboro Retreat, a psychiatric facility in Brattleboro, Vermont, and, soon after, by an AFT local of registered nurses at Copley Hospital in Vermont.

== New organizing ==
The United Nurses & Allied Professionals (UNAP) has had continued success in organizing new members across the health care professions. In 1999, UNAP organized a small group of public school nurses in Putnam, Connecticut. In 2004, UNAP organized social service workers in Youth Services, and in 2005 it organized clinicians at Health Care and Rehabilitative Services—both in Brattleboro. In January 2006, the union won an election for employees working in the adult services at the Homestead Group (formerly the Association for Retarded Citizens of Northern Rhode Island). In 2008, the UNAP organized 650 Registered Nurses at Kent Hospital, the second largest hospital in Rhode Island. The UNAP organized large numbers of members in residual bargaining units at Landmark Medical Center, Rehabilitation Hospital of RI, Westerly Hospital, Brattleboro Retreat, and Copley Hospital in Vermont.

In 2022, registered nurses at Roger Williams Medial Center voted to join the UNAP by a 2-1 margin.

== Structure ==
UNAP is a federation of affiliated local unions which have their own constitution, officers, and treasury. UNAP is governed by an Executive Council that includes a president, executive vice president, two vice presidents, secretary, treasurer and the president of each affiliated local. UNAP officers are elected at the UNAP bi-annual convention by delegates from each local. Lynn Blais, a nurse at Fatima Hospital, was the organization's first president. In 2001, Blais stepped down and Linda McDonald, an RN at Rhode Island Hospital, was elected president. (Blais was elected one of two vice presidents.)

The UNAP provides a wide variety of services to its locals and members, including collective bargaining, continuing education, legal, research, political action, communications, and organizing. Nationally, UNAP has at times worked closely with the California Nurses Association, the Massachusetts Nurses Association, and the Service Employees International Union. However, it remains firmly independent.
