= Florence Curtis Hanson =

American educator (1869-1951)

- Hanson, from a 1927 newspaper
- Born: Florence Curtis; January 18, 1869; Tidioute, Pennsylvania, U.S.
- Died: February 1, 1951 (aged 82); New Haven, Connecticut, U.S.
- Occupations: Educator, union official

Florence Curtis Hanson (January 18, 1869 – February 1, 1951) was an American educator and union official. She was executive secretary of the American Federation of Teachers from 1926 to 1935.

== Early life and education ==
Curtis was born in Tidioute, Pennsylvania, and raised in Olean, New York, the daughter of Allen R. Curtis and Anna R. Curtis. She attended Vassar College in the class of 1888. She earned a bachelor's degree from the University of Chicago in 1894.

== Career ==
Hanson taught at high schools in Pennsylvania, New York, and Chicago. Hanson was president of the Chicago High School Teachers' Council, and president of the Federation of Women High School Teachers. She was executive secretary of the American Federation of Teachers (AFT) from 1926 to 1935.

In 1925, Hanson was denied permission to be absent from classes to address the Chicago Woman's Club on teachers' councils. She spoke on Chicago radio broadcasts about teachers and organized labor in 1926 and 1927. In 1927, she helped launch the Washington Educational Union, a union for non-public-school educators, including university, private school, and community instructors. She and Selma Munter Borchardt went to Virginia to organize teachers in 1930.

In 1932, Hanson, Mary Cornelia Barker, and other leaders of the AFT campaigned against restrictions on teachers' personal lives, common in many districts. "They've passed resolutions putting school teachers to bed at 9 o'clock, prohibiting them from dancing and requiring them to teach Sunday school classes," she told a convention in 1932. "We must not hamper them with ridiculous restrictions."

She co-wrote the National Industrial Recovery Act of 1933's code for teachers, with Henry Linville. Also in 1933, she spoke and participated in the first meeting of the Oshkosh Vocational Teachers Federation. In 1935, she urged the Illinois State Teachers Association members to refuse to take a loyalty oath. She was executive editor of the AFT's magazine American Teacher.

== Personal life ==
Curtis married Charles B. Hanson in 1887; he died by 1900. Their daughter Helen married Egbert J. Miles, a longtime mathematics professor at Yale University. Hanson was visiting the Miles' household when she died in 1951, in New Haven, Connecticut, at the age of 82.
