= Minnesota Department of Education =

State government agency in Minnesota, United States

Agency overview
- Headquarters: 400 NE Stinson Blvd, Minneapolis, MN 55413-2614
- Website: education.mn.gov/MDE/index.htm

Minnesota Department of Education (MDE) is a state agency of Minnesota. Its headquarters are in Minneapolis.

== Commissioners ==
Image	Name	Appointed by	Term start	Term end	References	Notes
	Howard Casmey	State Board of Education	1970	1981		
	John J. Feda	State Board of Education	1981	1983		
	Ruth Randall	State Board of Education	1983	1989		
	Tom Nelson	State Board of Education	1990	1991		
	Gene Mammenga	State Board of Education	1991	1993		Before 1995 and after 2003: “Independent Department of Education”
	Linda Powell	State Board of Education	1993	1995		Pre-1995 Selected by the State Board of Education
	Bruce Johnson	Governor Arne Carlson	1995	1996		Post-1995 Appointed by the Governor with Senate confirmation
	Bob Wedl	Governor Arne Carlson	1996	1999		
	Christine Jax	Governor Jesse Ventura	1999	2003		1995-2003 Agency was part of the Department of Children, Families & Learning (CFL)
	Cheri Yecke	Governor Tim Pawlenty	2003	2004		Before 1995 and after 2003: “Independent Department of Education”
	Alice Seagren	Governor Tim Pawlenty	2004	2011		
	Brenda Cassellius	Governor Mark Dayton	2011	2019		
	Mary Cathryn Ricker	Governor Tim Walz	2019	2021		
	Heather Mueller	Governor Tim Walz	2021	2023		
	Willie Jett	Governor Tim Walz	2023	Present		

== See also ==
- Minnesota social services frauds
