= United Teachers of New Orleans =

United Teachers of New Orleans, AFT, NEA, AFL-CIO
- UTNO
- Founded: 1937
- Headquarters: 2714 Canal Street, Suite 302 New Orleans, Louisiana
- Location: United States
- Members: 1,000+
- Key people: Larry J. Carter Jr., President
- Parent organization: American Federation of Teachers, Louisiana Federation of Teachers
- Affiliations: AFL-CIO
- Website: www.utno.org

United Teachers of New Orleans (UTNO) is a labor union representing teachers and other educational workers in New Orleans, Louisiana, United States. It is an affiliate of the Louisiana Federation of Teachers (LFT), American Federation of Teachers (AFT) and the AFL-CIO.

UTNO was the first integrated teachers' union in Louisiana, and the first to win a collective bargaining agreement in the state without the protection of a state employees collective bargaining law. Once the largest union in Louisiana, a state takeover of the city public schools in the wake of Hurricane Katrina nearly destroyed the union. UTNO has been reorganizing with help from its parent union, the American Federation of Teachers, and the AFL-CIO. As of August 2007, the union had regained more than 1,000 members and in October 2007 began negotiating its first post-storm contract with the Orleans Parish school board (OPSB).

== Formation and early fights for collective bargaining ==
UTNO was founded in 1937, but for a quarter of a century it struggled. Unions in the city were segregated, and the organization's black membership (affiliated with the AFT) was unable to accomplish much. In 1948, union president Veronica B. Hill was elected an AFT vice president. In 1954, after the AFT amended its constitution to require integrated locals, the affiliate integrated—although most white teachers in New Orleans still belonged to the NEA.

The formation of the United Federation of Teachers in New York City in 1961 electrified teachers in the U.S., and collective bargaining gained momentum across the nation and in Louisiana. The AFT formed a state federation, the Louisiana Federation of Teachers, to help counter the strength of the Louisiana Education Association (which opposed collective bargaining and strikes). Both the NEA and AFT teachers' unions in New Orleans, however, pushed the OPSB for the right to bargain collectively. In 1966, the AFT affiliate struck for three days in an attempt to win a contract. But only 10 percent of the city's 5,000 teachers walked off the job.

The AFT struck New Orleans public schools again in 1969, asking all teachers to follow the union onto the picket line. Nearly 1,000 teachers—almost all of them black, and members of the AFT—walked out. Unfortunately, the only schools that closed were those with an overwhelmingly African American student body. The national AFT flew in a large number of national organizing staff to save the strike. But other unions in the city refused to honor the strike. After black students in several high schools rioted, the African American community withdrew its support for the union. The strike folded after three weeks.

== Merger and collective bargaining ==
In 1972, the AFT and NEA affiliates in New Orleans agreed to merge and form the United Teachers of New Orleans. The union became the first integrated education union in the South. Since the NEA did not permit dual-affiliated locals at the time, the merged union had its charter withdrawn by the NEA. Nat LaCour, a black teacher, was elected to succeed Hill as president of the local. He was elected an AFT vice president in 1974.

In 1978, the union struck again to win collective bargaining, and this time was successful. With white teachers finally participating in the strike, nearly 3,500 of the school district's 5,000 educators walked out, and two-thirds of the city's children were affected. UTNO had prepared for the strike by working closely with parents and community activists this time, and soon parents began joining the picket line and protesting as well. The strike lasted 12 days before the district agreed to recognize the union and sign a collective bargaining agreement, giving the union a 7 percent pay hike and better health insurance. UTNO became the first teachers' union in the Deep South to win a contract without the protection of a state public employee collective bargaining law.

UTNO did not strike again until 1990. Once more, the issue was pay. And, once more, two-thirds of the city's teachers walked off the job. The strike lasted three weeks, and again the union was successful in winning substantial pay increases.

In 1998, LaCour was elected executive vice president of the AFT, and he retired as UTNO president. Brenda Mitchell was elected to succeed him.

Over the years, UTNO organized paraprofessionals (teacher aides) and clericals (school and administrative secretaries and other clerical employees) in addition to teachers. The union's membership stood at over 7,500 members in August 2005, making UTNO the largest union in the city and the state. The union's political power was so great that it could often make or break political careers not only in New Orleans but in many parts of the state.

The biggest issue facing the union in the 1990s and early 2000s was the quality of education. The dropout rate in city schools was very high, particularly among African American children, and few minority public school graduates went on to higher education. New Orleans students also tested very low on a number of reading, math, science and other measures. UTNO argued that New Orleans students suffered from severe poverty, malnutrition, poor health care and domestic violence, all of which significantly impaired their ability to learn. The school district was chronically underfunded and financially mismanaged, and leadership turnover was high (with nine interim or permanent superintendents in 10 years). The solution, the union argued, was for significantly higher levels of funding for the schools and other public social services agencies. Critics, however, said that the union was a significant part of the problem. Despite evidence to the contrary, critics alleged that the union's collective bargaining agreement protected incompetent teachers, made it difficult to adopt an innovative curriculum, failed to reward good teaching, established onerous work rules.

In 2003, the Louisiana State Legislature created the Recovery School District (RSD). The legislation established a School Performance Score (SPS). The SPS was a composite evaluation based on the scores of one of three student performance exams, the school's dropout rate, and the school's attendance rate. A school was labeled "academically unacceptable" (AU) if it failed to achieve a minimum SPS score of 45. (In 2004, the legislature raised the minimum SPS score to 60.) Any school designated as AU for four consecutive years was classified as "failing" and eligible for state takeover. However, a failing school could be transferred to the RSD only if a private organization agreed to assume management of the school and turn it into a charter school.

After two years, only five New Orleans public schools had been transferred to the RSD.

== Post-Hurricane Katrina ==
On August 29, 2005, Hurricane Katrina hit the city of New Orleans.

UTNO members, about to begin the school year, received their first and last two-week paycheck on September 1, 2005. With no tax revenue flowing into OPSB coffers, the school district cancelled further paychecks and all insurance for New Orleans education workers.

Hurricane Katrina also left 100 of New Orleans' 128 school buildings heavily damaged.

Reacting to the devastation wrought by Hurricane Katrina, on November 22, 2005, the Louisiana legislature passed Act 35 and took over the New Orleans public school system. Eleven of the 20 state representatives from Orleans Parish voted against the takeover plan.

Act 35 changed the definition of a failing public school and the terms under which the state could assume of a school. First, the definition of a failing SPS score was defined as "below the state average." In the 2004-05 school year, the state average was 87.4. Thus, Act 35 substantially raised the bar for low-performing schools. Second, Act 35 expanded the state's takeover authority to entire school districts (rather than individual schools). Act 35 defined a failing school district as one with more than 30 failing schools, or one where at least 50 percent of students attended AU schools.

Act 35 applied almost exclusively to Orleans Parish. Only 14 of Louisiana's 64 school districts had more than 30 schools, and almost none of them had the requisite number of AU schools or percentage of students in AU school to meet the new definition of a "failing" school district.

To UTNO leaders, Act 35 seemed aimed squarely at them. Conservative state legislators appeared to be using the Hurricane Katrina crisis to break the union in the name of quality education. "The changes in the SPS standard, the addition of a 30-school threshold provision and the timing of this change strongly suggest that state officials were intent on assuming control of most OPSB public schools. This view is also supported by the fact that although there are 'failing' schools in three other Louisiana school districts, state officials have not initiated a takeover of any of those schools."

Act 35 had a significant effect on the Orleans Parish School Board's functioning. The RSD took over 112 schools, operating 95 of them directly and permitting 17 others to be run by charter school organizations. The Louisiana State Board of Elementary and Secondary Education took over two other public schools, turning them over to charter school operators as well. OPSB retained control over only 18 schools. To obtain federal funding to repair and reopen these schools, OPSB turned 13 of the schools over to a single charter school operator, the Algiers Charter School Association. Only five schools remained under the direct control of OPSB.

Whether intended to do so or not, Act 35 broke the United Teachers of New Orleans. With so few schools under its control, OPSB fired all teachers and other city education personnel on January 31, 2006. On February 1, 2006, UTNO filed suit to force the city to open more public schools. Another suit attempted to win back-pay as a result of Act 35 layoffs, while a third sought contractually required disaster pay, lost sick days, employer-paid health care premiums, and additional employer contributions to the union's health and welfare funds. When the union's collective bargaining agreement expired in June 2006, the OPSB declined to renegotiate the agreement.

As of late December 2006, only 27,066 of New Orleans' pre-Katrina student population of 66,372 had returned. Only 54 schools were open, with 20 of these operated by OPSB, charter schools approved by OPSB or charter schools approved by the state board of education. The remaining 34 schools were operated by the RSD, and 74 schools remained closed.

== Post-Katrina collective bargaining ==
As New Orleans and other nearby cities struggled to recover from Hurricane Katrina, UTNO sought to reinsert itself into policy- and decision-making in the OPSB, RSD, Algiers Charter School Association and other independent charter schools. With RSD facing a shortage of 500 teachers in the 2007-2008 school year, UTNO pledged to help recruit teachers. UTNO tied its cooperation, however, to increased job security for teachers. In April 2007, UTNO attempted to re-establish a collective bargaining relationship with the Orleans Parish School Board. Although the union represented 170 of the parish's approximately 245 teachers and other employers, the school board declined to open negotiations, citing the continuing lawsuits against the school board.

The union also undertook a number of initiatives in 2007 to rebuild its influence. When a charter school board suspended its director, principal and four others after parents and teachers accused them of inflicting unduly harsh corporal punishment on students and summarily firing teachers, UTNO argued that the incident was a prime example of why a collective bargaining agreement with due process and grievance provisions was necessarily. The union also began staging small, regular demonstrations throughout the city to protest the lack of a contract and publicize problems in the various public and private schools. The union also began pushing for re-unification of the various schools and districts under one management structure, which the union claimed would help stabilize the district and provide more uniform administrative and teaching policies. It would also help rebuild union membership more quickly if collective bargaining resumed.

The union's actions appeared to pay off. OPSB Superintendent Paul Vallas made public appearances with UTNO President Brenda Mitchell, and asked for the union to partner with the district in improving education. Mitchell offered a conciliatory response, saying that UTNO stood "ready to work with the new superintendent to turn this district around." In October 2007, the union and OPSB settled lawsuits the union filed the previous year. The school board agreed to pay $1,000 each of its 6,800 employees fired after Hurricane Katrina and to contribute $200,000 to the union to administer the payouts. In exchange, the union ended five lawsuits against the OPSB, and dropped three arbitrations involving the school district. The OPSB also agreed to negotiate a new contract with UTNO as part of the settlement. The union dropped the School Board as a defendant in a sixth suit, while continuing its case against the Louisiana Board of Elementary and Secondary Education and the Louisiana Department of Education. The union's membership rose dramatically as the AFT devoted large amounts of organizing and other assistance to the local union. There is some disagreement about just how many members the union had, however. Union president Mitchell said the local had 900 members during the 2006-2007 school year. But a union spokesperson said the union had more than 1,000 members in June 2007. It is unclear how many of these members are teachers, however. About 1,000 teachers were employed by OPSB in August 2007.

UTNO continued to criticize the performance of the charter schools in New Orleans. In October 2007, the union issued a report, "Reading, Writing and Reality Check," which claimed that LEAP test scores (the state's yearly assessment of progress) in charter schools were no higher than in public schools. Rather, UTNO said, LEAP scores were highest in schools that had more veteran teachers. The National Alliance for Public Charter Schools challenged the reports conclusions, although the group also agreed that the RSD had far more organizational and financial problems than the charter schools (which could account for the RSD's poorer performance).

In January 2008, negotiations finally opened with the OPSB on a new collective bargaining contract. The OPSB unanimously elected Torin Sanders, a union supporter, president of the board. Sanders replaced Phyllis Landrieu, a former OPSB president and strong supporter of charter schools.

In February 2008, the union claimed supermajorities among eligible staff in both OPSB and RSD-run schools.
