= Florence Rood =

American schoolteacher and trade unionist

- Born: 1873
- Died: April 13, 1944 (aged 70–71)
- Burial place: Roselawn Cemetery

Florence Rood (1873–1944) was an American schoolteacher and trade unionist from Saint Paul, Minnesota. She served as the second president of the American Federation of Teachers from 1924 to 1926, which made her the first woman president of an AFL-affiliated union that included both men and women members. In 1922, she became the first woman to preside over a meeting of the Saint Paul Trades and Labor Assembly.

== Biography ==
Rood was born in Iowa as the fourth of six children, and grew up attending a Congregational Church. Her family valued education and Rood knew from an early age that she would become a teacher. In June 1888, her family moved to St. Paul. She graduated from St. Paul High School in 1892, and proceeded to teach at rural schools in Iowa and North Dakota. She soon returned to St. Paul to attend the teacher-training Normal School, from which she graduated in 1894. She then taught at St. Paul's Webster School for 19 years.

In 1898, Rood helped to found the Grade Teachers' Organization, which represented the predominantly women's field of St. Paul teaching. As part of this group, Rood appeared before the Board of School Inspectors arguing for increased pay for kindergarten teachers as kindergarten positions required an education equal to that of grade teachers. In 1913, Rood became the head of the Normal School's kindergarten department, and developed the schools kindergarten/elementary program. She then became the supervisor of kindergarten for St. Paul schools between 1916 and 1917.

In 1909, Rood lobbied against a proposed state law for a merit-based pay system where salaries were based on education level and seniority. Following the enablement of pensions by the Minnesota Legislature, Rood led a group of teachers in devising a pension plan that went into effect in 1910.

In 1918, St. Paul grade school teachers joined the American Federation of Teachers, forming Local 28. With around 400 members, the group affiliated with the St. Paul Trades and Labor Assembly. Rood became a local leader, and was elected to the national AFT executive council in 1919. She became the second woman president of the organization in 1924.

In 1920, Rood became the secretary-treasurer of the St. Paul Teachers' Retirement Fund Association, managing the plan continuously for two decades. She also started writing a column for the newspaper the St. Paul Union Advocate called "The Distaff: A Department Devoted to Women's Views on Matters of Public Concern" and served on the paper's first board of directors. She was active in the Working People's Non Partisan League, serving on the organization's executive committee in 1921. In 1922, she became the first woman to preside over a meeting of the St. Paul Trades and Labor Assembly.

Rood pushed for legislation to grant tenure to elementary and high school teachers, sponsoring meetings in 1917. In 1927, she and her organization helped secure the passage of a tenure law for St. Paul, Minneapolis, and Duluth.

Rood was also involved in the Farmer Labor Party, held statewide positions, and founded the Ramsey County Farmer-Labor Women’s Association. She was appointed a member of the state board of education by Governor Floyd Olson in 1933. Olson re-appointed her in 1936, but the State Senate refused to confirm the appointment, saying that she was a radical.

Rood continued to head the St. Paul Teacher’s Retirement Association until 1939. She died in 1944 and is buried in Roselawn Cemetery.
