= Cincinnati Federation of Teachers =

Labor union in Cincinnati, Ohio, United States

- AFT Local 1520
- Association of Cincinnati Public School Office Personnel
- Founded: 1936, 1964
- Headquarters: Cincinnati, Ohio
- Location: United States
- Key people: Tom Mooney; Julie Sellers, president
- Parent organization: American Federation of Teachers
- Affiliations: AFL–CIO
- Website: cft-aft.org

The Cincinnati Federation of Teachers (CFT) is a labor union representing teachers, paraprofessionals, support personnel and others in the Cincinnati public school system. The union is Local 1520 of the American Federation of Teachers (AFT), AFL–CIO.

The union's official name is the Cincinnati Teachers Union, but is more commonly referred to as the Cincinnati Federation of Teachers or CFT.

== History ==
The CFT was formed on December 18, 1936 as Local 479 of the AFT. Lacking the legal right to bargain collectively, the nascent union pushed for higher wages, an end to discrimination against married women teachers, smaller class sizes and desegregation.

The CFT competed for the allegiance of teachers with the Cincinnati Teachers Association (CTA), an affiliate of the National Education Association (NEA). In the post-World War II era, the CFT focused on desegregation more than wages and benefits, or a collective bargaining relationship. The CTA, which emphasized higher teachers wages and was much more aggressive in its dealings with the school district administration, added many new members (often at the expense of CFT). By 1952, CFT had only a small number of active members.

In 1964, in the wake of the formation of the United Federation of Teachers and a surge in teacher union militancy within the union, the AFT issued a new charter for a union of Cincinnati educators and the Cincinnati Teachers Union (CTU) became Local 1520.

The CTU began an aggressive campaign to elect pro-union supporters to the city council, mayor's office and school board. The goal was to elect a majority of elected officials willing to pass a collective bargaining law. In 1976, the CTU was successful in winning passage of a collective bargaining ordinance. In the election which followed-in which teachers could vote for the CTU, CTA or no union-CTU won easily. It negotiated its first contract in the following months. CTU later won an election to represent paraprofessionals (such as school nurses, teachers aides, librarians, counselors, school health personnel and others).

In 1979, Tom Mooney, a teacher of government in a Cincinnati high school, was elected president of the CTU.

In early 1980, Cincinnati public school office personnel represented by the Association of Cincinnati Public Schools Office Personnel (ACPSOP) voted to affiliate with CTU.

Ohio's Public Employee Collective Bargaining Act, enacted in 1984, provided additional legal support for the CTU's collective bargaining relationship.

In 2000, Mooney stepped down as CTU president after winning election as president of the Ohio Federation of Teachers (OFT). CTU began calling itself the "Cincinnati Federation of Teachers" (CFT) after Mooney's departure, although many union members still prefer CTU.

The CFT is affiliated with the Ohio Federation of Teachers, the Cincinnati Central Labor Council, and the Ohio AFL–CIO.
