= Rhode Island Federation of Teachers and Health Professionals =

Rhode Island Federation of Teachers
- Rhode Island Federation of Teachers and Health Professionals
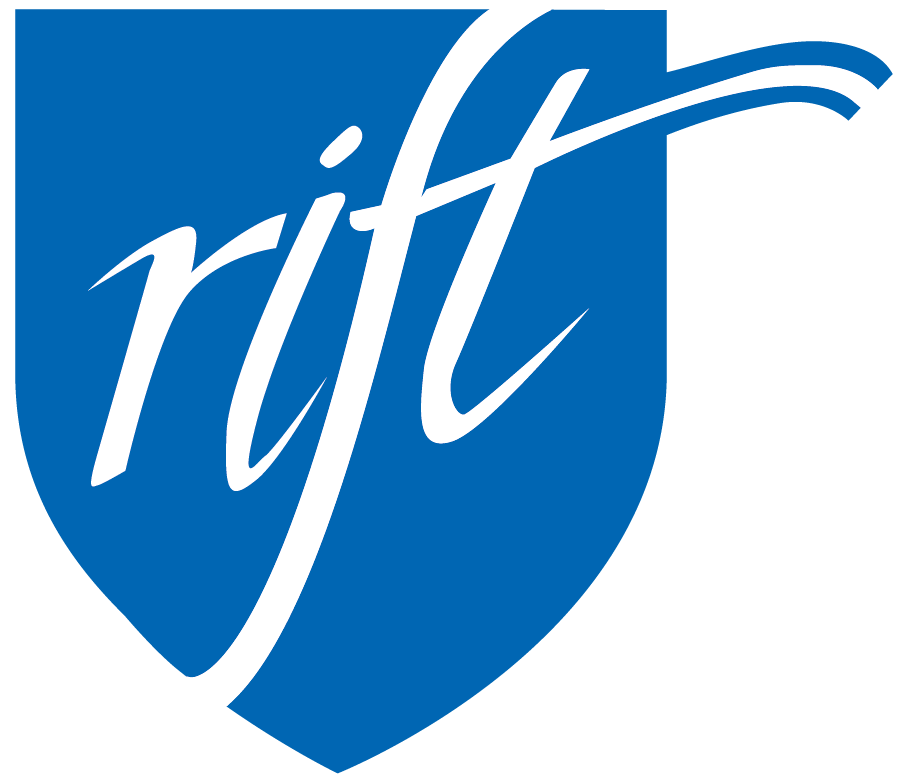
- Abbreviation: RIFTHP
- Type: Labor union, non-profit
- Headquarters: Providence, Rhode Island
- Location: United States
- Members: 11,000
- President: Francis J. Flynn
- Board of directors: Executive Board composed of 24 local presidents and 5 elected officers
- Key people: Kenn Fontaine, Executive Assistant
- Affiliations: American Federation of Teachers, AFL–CIO
- Staff: President, Executive Assistant, Administrative Assistant, Director of Professionals, Field Representatives, Treasurer
- Website: rifthp.org

The Rhode Island Federation of Teachers and Health Professionals (RIFTHP) is a statewide federation of labor unions in Rhode Island in the United States. The federation's local unions represent teachers and other educational workers, state and municipal employees, healthcare workers in the public and private sectors, and higher education faculty and workers in the public and private sectors. It is an affiliate of the American Federation of Teachers (AFT) and the AFL–CIO.

In 2021, the federation's president was Francis J. Flynn.

== History ==
The Rhode Island Federation of Teachers was founded as the Rhode Island Branch American Federation of Teachers on March 27, 1947. The original unions making up the federation were the Warwick Teachers' Union, the North Providence Federation of Teachers, the Pawtucket Teachers' Alliance, the Woonsocket Teachers' Guild, and the Providence Teachers' Alliance. Four years after its formation, the Pawtucket Teachers' Alliance went out on strike—one of a handful of local unions to disobey a national AFT policy banning teacher strikes. The federation changed its name to the Rhode Island Federation of Teachers in 1958. The Pawtucket strike ended in a settlement favorable to the union and a rudimentary contract—one of the first teacher contracts in the United States. Another strike in Pawtucket in 1964 also ended in a contract personally negotiated by Governor John Chafee. This collective bargaining experience helped pave the way for the legalization of teacher unionism in Rhode Island two years later.

Public school teachers in Rhode Island were given the legal right to bargain collectively "...hours, salary, working conditions, and other terms of professional employment" in May 1966 (P.L. 1966, Chapter 146). Rhode Island law also allows payment of unemployment benefits to public school workers if they strike for more than eight weeks.

Edward J. McElroy was President of RIFTHP from 1969 to 1992. He was elected Secretary-Treasurer of the AFT in 1992 and President in 2004 (he retired in 2008).

In 1971, David Selden, then a national representative with the AFT, attempted to convince the leaders of RIFTHP to join with the state federations in Connecticut and New York to fund and operate an organizing project, but the RIFTHP leaders rejected the idea.

In the early 1970s, RIFTHP and the NEA statewide affiliate in Rhode Island considered merging but did not do so. During the same years, RIFTHP was also active in organizing higher education faculty. When the AFT and the National Education Association signed a tentative merger agreement in 1998, RIFTHP leaders refused to commit to a state-level merger immediately (but supported the national effort).

RIFTHP began organizing nurses in the late 1970s and early 1980s. Its most significant effort in this area came when it organized more than 1,000 registered nurses at Rhode Island Hospital in August 1993. But in 1998, more than 3,500 healthcare workers belonging to RIFTHP disaffiliated in a dispute over how much money should be spent on organizing new members. Although RIFTHP and the AFT disputed the election results and sued former staff who went to work for the new union (the United Nurses and Allied Professionals), the AFT lost these challenges.

== Activities ==
The Rhode Island Federation of Teachers and Health Professionals is considered one of the most active political groups in Rhode Island. It sued to oppose the shut-down of the Rhode Island state government during a budget crisis in 1991, fought to keep full-time union leaders (who were former public employees) in the state pension system, worked to enact strong constraints on charter schools in the state's charter school law (the resulting law is one of the most restrictive in the nation as of 2004), supported stronger and clearer curriculum standards, sued to stop the state from penalizing retired public employees who were enrolled in more expensive health care plans, opposed binding arbitration for teacher union contracts, opposed merit pay, fought reductions in retiree pensions, and sought to limit the role of school-wide committees in establishing teacher assignments, class sizes and layoff rules.

A significant network of unionized teachers interested in applying new union structures and models to create high-quality schools, part of the Teacher Union Reform Network (TURN), is also active within RIFTHP. There have been some media reports that this network has influenced RIFTHP and that the state federation is more willing to embrace some union and school reform efforts. In 2006, RIFTHP and the NEA affiliate in Rhode Island issued a joint report which focused on poverty and its many negative effects on children (such as malnutrition, unstable or violent home situations, lack of access to books and educational items like crayons or paper, and little access to high-quality early childhood programs) as key issues in the school reform effort. The report dismissed criticism that collective bargaining agreements stymied reform and pressed for higher spending on early childhood programs, reduced class size, and improved teacher training programs. In 2009, the state federation began pushing local school boards to adopt much more rigorous teacher evaluation standards and a stronger mentoring program. The state of Rhode Island approved the plan for adoption by local school boards, and RIFTHP won a $200,000 national competitive grant to help fund the first four programs (to be implemented in Central Falls, Cranston, Pawtucket, Providence, West Warwick, and Woonsocket).

== Publications ==
The RIFTHP issues one publication, the Smith Hill Report. The Smith Hill Report is published weekly while the Rhode Island General Assembly is in session. It is available on RIFTHP's Web site.
