= Michael Mulgrew =

American schoolteacher and trade union leader

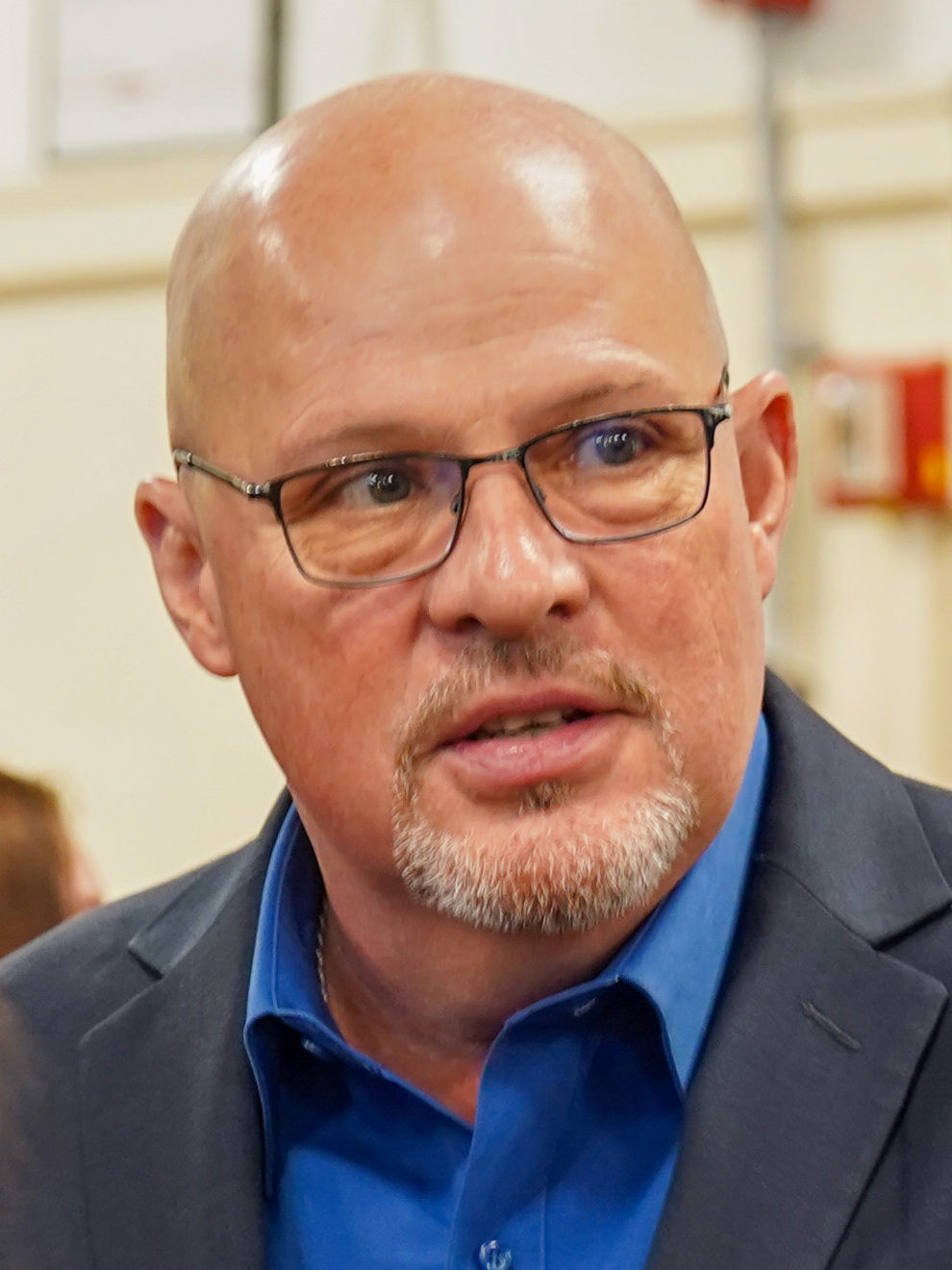
- Mulgrew in 2025

President of the United Federation of Teachers
- Incumbent
- Assumed office 2009
- Preceded by: Randi Weingarten

Personal details
- Born: 1965 (age 60–61) Staten Island, New York, United States
- Education: College of Staten Island (BA)
- Occupation: Carpenter, Trade union leader; Teacher

Michael Mulgrew (born 1965) is an American labor official serving as the fifth president of the United Federation of Teachers, the trade union of teachers in New York City, New York. The union's executive board elected Mulgrew in July 2009. Prior to his current position, Michael was elected vice president for career and technical education (CTE) high schools in 2005 and became the union's chief operating officer in 2008.

== Early life and teaching career ==
Mulgrew was born on Staten Island, New York in 1965. He attended Roman Catholic schools; and he graduated from the City University of New York system (College of Staten Island) with a B.A. in English literature and a minor in psychology. At one time, he apprenticed and worked as a carpenter.

Mulgrew began his teaching career working as a substitute teacher at South Richmond High School IS/PS 25 on Staten Island, a District 75 school. He became a full-time teacher at William E. Grady Career and Technical Education High School, a vocational school in Brooklyn, New York in 1993. He held his first UFT office, as chapter leader at the high school in 1999, and helped win the Grady High School UFT chapter a Trachtenberg Award for its strength and unity in 2002.

== Union Federation of Teachers ==
He was appointed to the presidency in 2009 by the union's executive board. He was the only candidate offered in the vote. He was elected by 91 percent of the union members in April 2010.

In an article in City Hall News in July 2009, Mulgrew talked about his strong belief in collaboration with parents, saying, ”I always like to keep up community involvement, working with parents and advocating for students. We do a lot of that now and that’s what we need to do more of, to help the schools that are struggling and to figure out ways the UFT can support and help them.”

=== Closing of "rubber rooms" ===
On April 15, 2010, the United Federation of Teachers, Mulgrew, and Mayor Michael Bloomberg announced an agreement to close temporary reassignment centers (TRCs), also known as "rubber rooms," where the Department of Education sent teachers and other employees who were being investigated or going through a hearing process. However, the elimination of the rubber rooms by the UFT and Mayor Michael Bloomberg in 2010 in the public eye did not solve the issue of employees of the school system removed for various reasons, who continue to remain sitting in various school offices, school buildings and borough offices throughout New York City after being removed from their positions pending the results of their hearings, or not.

=== Medicare Advantage plan ===
Mulgrew, the Executive Vice Chair of the Municipal Labor Committee, a consortium of all New York City public employee labor unions, advanced a plan that would move UFT retirees and other retired New York City workers from Medicare into a new, privately run Medicare Advantage plan and removing retirees access to Traditional Medicare and implemented copays on all their tests and visits to the doctor or lab. Large numbers of UFT retirees have complained about the proposed plan and joined with tens of thousands of other City Retirees to halt the move in court. Retired New York City teachers and other New York City retirees have protested that the new plan falls short and organized opposition to the new plan and a Manhattan Supreme Court Justice agreed. The Mayor has appealed every loss in court and so far has not had the decisions overturned.

=== Lawsuit against congestion pricing in New York City ===
In 2024, the UFT joined Staten Island in a lawsuit to block congestion pricing in lower Manhattan. The union argued that congestion pricing would worsen pollution and harm children. Mulgrew also said that the congestion pricing plan would harm teachers who "are facing dramatically rising commuting costs, and all for a traffic reduction plan whose potential effects on air quality and other issues were never seriously examined."

== Notes ==
Preceded by Randi Weingarten	President, United Federation of Teachers; 2009 -	Succeeded by incumbent
