= Department for Professional Employees, AFL–CIO =

DPE, AFL–CIO
- Department for Professional Employees, AFL–CIO
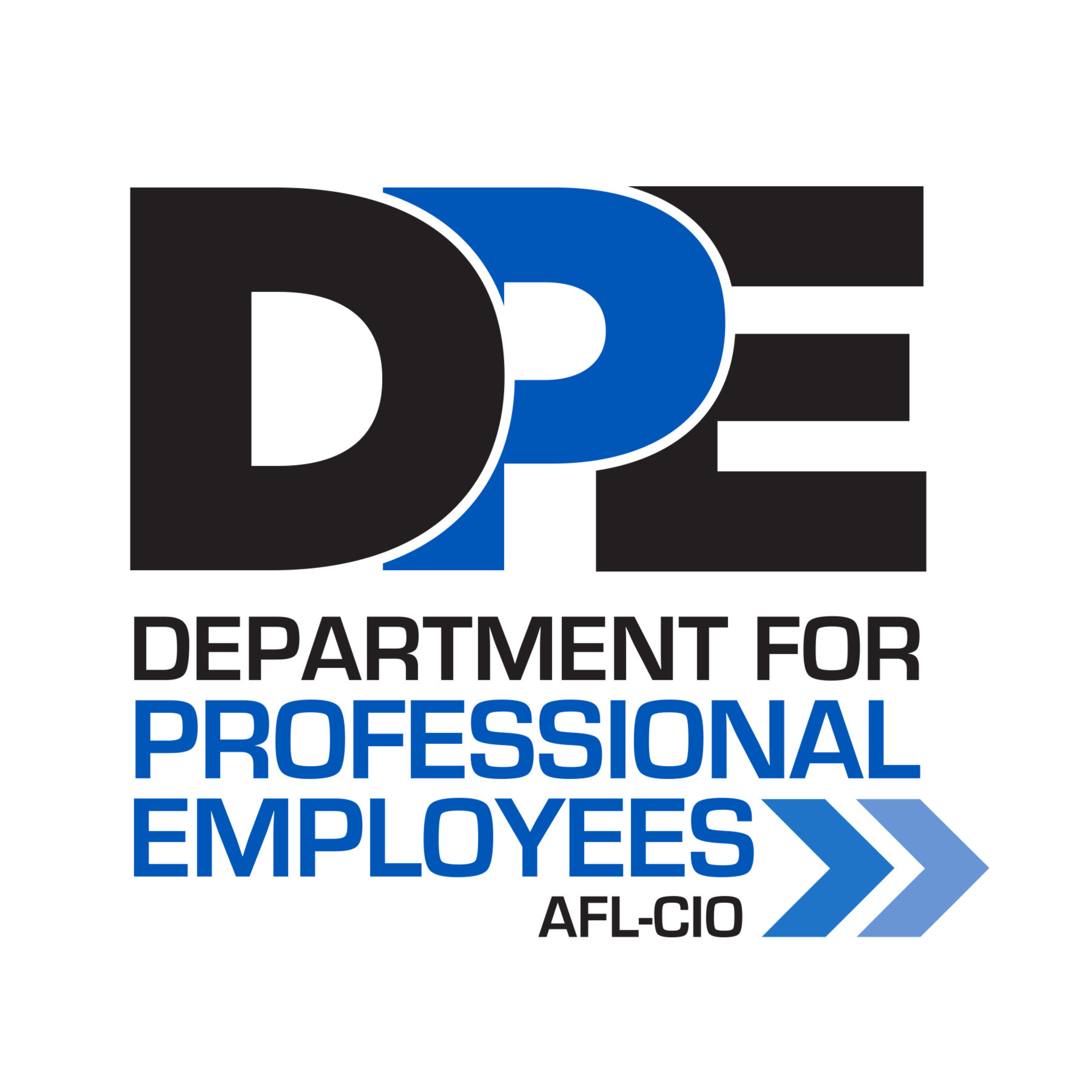
- Abbreviation: DPE
- Founded: 1977
- Headquarters: Washington, D.C.
- Location: United States
- Key people: Jennifer Dorning
- Parent organization: AFL–CIO
- Website: www.dpeaflcio.org

The Department for Professional Employees, AFL–CIO (DPE) is a semi-autonomous "trade" department of the AFL-CIO, and serves as an advocate for professional workers within the federation, and before legislative bodies, the press and the public.

== Founding ==
In 1967, the Council for Scientific Professional and Cultural Employees (SPACE), affiliated with the AFL–CIO, was formed. In 1974, it was renamed the Council for Professional Employees (CPE).

In 1977, the AFL–CIO constitution was amended to transform the council into the Department for Professional Employees. DPE's first president was Albert Shanker, president of the American Federation of Teachers.

== Structure ==
As a semi-autonomous department of the AFL–CIO, the DPE has its own constitution, elects its own board of directors and officers, holds its own convention, makes policy, and sets dues. In many respects, it acts like a labor federation of its own.

DPE is governed by its affiliate unions. Currently, 24 national unions representing over four million workers belong to DPE. Representatives from DPE's member unions meet in a quadrennial meeting, at which members elect a board of directors and officers, set dues, and discuss and approve policies. DPE members are free to establish their own policies and procedures so long as they do not conflict with the constitution and policies of the AFL–CIO.

DPE members elect three executive officers—a president, first vice president and treasurer, as well as nine individuals to a board of directors. One of the nine is elected as chair of the board. The board is the governing body of DPE. Day-to-day operations are overseen by the president.

Under the AFL–CIO constitution, DPE (as with all trade departments) has certain rights. DPE officers are entitled to attend meetings of the AFL–CIO executive council as well as certain standing and policy committees of the council. DPE also may elect delegates to represent it at the AFL–CIO quadrennial convention, and its delegates may participate in the convention's committees. As a matter of courtesy and AFL–CIO policy, DPE officers are also invited to participate in the activities of a wide variety of AFL–CIO councils, committees, policy-making groups, and staff and departmental meetings.

DPE is one of six constitutional departments of the AFL–CIO, which means that it may not be abolished without amending the AFL–CIO's constitution.

Currently, the chair of the DPE general board is Fedrick Ingram, American Federation of Teachers. The first vice president is Duncan Crabtree-Ireland, National Executive Director and Chief Negotiator of SAG-AFTRA. The treasurer is Matt Biggs, president of the International Federation of Professional and Technical Engineers.

DPE's president is Jennifer Dorning.

== Leadership ==
=== Presidents ===
- Albert "Al" Shanker, 1977 - 1989
- Jack Golodner, 1989 - 2001
- Paul Almeida, 2001 - 2018
- Jennifer Dorning, 2018–present

=== General Board Chairs ===
- Albert "Al" Shanker, 1977 - 1997
- Morton "Morty" Bahr, 1997 - 2001
- Edward "Ed" J. McElroy, 2001 - 2008
- Tom Lee, 2008 - 2010
- Jeffrey David Cox, 2010 - 2020
- Paul Shearon, 2020 - 2021
- Fedrick C. Ingram, 2021–present
