= Randi Weingarten =

President of the American Federation of Teachers from 1998 - 2008

- Weingarten in 2026

President of the American Federation of Teachers
- Incumbent
- Assumed office July 14, 2008
- Preceded by: Edward J. McElroy

President of the United Federation of Teachers
- In office 1998–2008
- Preceded by: Sandra Feldman
- Succeeded by: Michael Mulgrew

Personal details
- Born: December 18, 1957 (age 68) New York City, U.S.
- Party: Democratic
- Spouse: Sharon Kleinbaum (m. 2018)
- Education: Cornell University (BS); Yeshiva University (JD)

Rhonda "Randi" Weingarten (born December 18, 1957) is an American labor leader, attorney, and educator who has served since 2008 as president of the American Federation of Teachers (AFT), an affiliate of the AFL–CIO. A former president of New York City’s United Federation of Teachers (UFT), she previously worked as the union’s chief negotiator and counsel and taught social studies at Clara Barton High School. She is widely noted as the first openly gay person elected to lead a national American labor union.

As AFT president, Weingarten has been a prominent voice in national debates over K–12 policy, advocating for “bottom-up” school improvement, community schools, and limits on high-stakes testing while supporting accountability measures and selective use of assessments. Her leadership and positions on standardized testing, charter schools, tenure, and educator pensions have drawn both support and criticism from policymakers, advocacy groups, and the press.

During her tenure with the UFT, Weingarten oversaw a series of major collective-bargaining agreements in New York City that increased teacher pay while lengthening the workday and workweek, positions that figured prominently in citywide education policy debates of the 2000s.

== Early life ==
Weingarten was born in 1957 in New York City, to a Jewish family, Gabriel and Edith (Appelbaum) Weingarten. Her father was an electrical engineer and her mother a teacher. Weingarten grew up in Rockland County, New York, and attended Clarkstown High School North in New City, New York. A congregant of Congregation Beit Simchat Torah, she considers herself a deeply religious Jew.

Weingarten's interest in trade unions and political advocacy was formed during childhood. Her mother's union went on a seven-week strike when Weingarten was in the eleventh grade. Under New York state's Taylor Law, her mother could have been fired for taking part in a strike. Instead, she was fined two days' pay for every day she was on strike. Later that year, the school board cut $2 million from the budget. Weingarten and several other students convinced the school board to let them conduct a survey regarding the impact of the cuts. The survey led several school board members to change their minds and rescind the cuts.

From 1979 to 1980, Weingarten was a legislative assistant for the Labor Committee of the New York State Senate. She received a B.S. degree in labor relations from the ILR School at Cornell University in 1980 and a J.D. degree from the Yeshiva University Cardozo School of Law in 1983.

== Legal career ==
Weingarten worked as a lawyer for the firm of Stroock & Stroock & Lavan from 1983 to 1986, where she handled several acrimonious arbitration cases on behalf of the UFT. She was appointed an adjunct instructor at the Cardozo School of Law in 1986. She also worked as an attorney in the real estate department of Wien Malkin and Bettex.

In 1986, Weingarten became counsel to Sandra Feldman, then-president of the UFT. Weingarten handled high-level grievances for the union. She was also lead counsel for the union in a number of lawsuits against New York City and the state of New York over school funding and school safety. By the early 1990s, she was the union's primary negotiator in UFT contract negotiations.

== Teaching career ==
From 1991 to 1997 she taught at Clara Barton High School in Crown Heights, Brooklyn. The classes she taught included Law, Ethical Issues in Medicine, AP Political Science, and US History and Government. Weingarten was one of two coaches for the school's team for the 1995 We the People civics competition. The team won the New York State championship and moved on to the national championship where they finished in 4th place.

== UFT career ==
Elected the UFT's treasurer in 1997, Weingarten succeeded Sandra Feldman as president of the union a year later when Feldman was elected president of the national American Federation of Teachers. Weingarten was elected a Vice President of the AFT the same year.

Weingarten was reelected by consistently wide margins after her initial appointment in 1998. The local union's constitution required her to run for the UFT presidency within a year of her appointment. She received 74 percent of the vote against two opponents in 1999 and served the final two years of Feldman's term. She ran in 2001 for a full term and was re-elected. She won her third full three-year term with more than 88 percent of the vote, despite having two opposing candidates. On March 30, 2007, Weingarten won reelection to a fourth term as UFT President, garnering 87 percent of the vote.

Weingarten stepped down from her post as president of the United Federation of Teachers on July 31, 2009. An opinion piece in the New York Post on January 16, 2011, characterized Weingarten's final paycheck from the UFT—which included payments for unused vacation days and sick time—as a $194,188 "golden parachute."

=== Collective bargaining ===
Weingarten began negotiating her first contract as UFT president in 2000. Talks with the Giuliani administration began in early September 2000, but the contract expired on November 15, 2000, without a new agreement. By March 2001, the talks deadlocked, and a state mediator was called in. Talks collapsed again on June 5, and Weingarten asked for state arbitration.

To pressure Giuliani, Weingarten endorsed Alan Hevesi in the Democratic primary. In the run-off between Green and Ferrer, Weingarten endorsed Ferrer, who lost to Green. Michael Bloomberg defeated Green in the November 2001 election. Weingarten demanded a 22 percent wage hike; Giuliani offered 8 percent. Talks collapsed on March 9, and Weingarten began preparing the UFT for its first strike since the early 1970s. In the state arbitration panel's mid-April report, it advocated a major salary boost and a longer work week. Both sides agreed to a new collective bargaining agreement in June, raising wages 16 to 22 percent and lengthening the work week by 100 minutes.

The UFT's contract expired on May 31, 2003. Once again, negotiations proved contentious. In January 2004, New York City School Chancellor Joel Klein proposed a merit-pay deal; in February, Mayor Bloomberg proposed replacing the union's 200-page contract with an 8-page set of guidelines. Weingarten rejected these proposals and asked for state mediation in late March 2004. In May, Weingarten agreed to discuss merit pay. The union began a public-relations campaign featuring subway and television ads demanding a contract and held protests and marches. On June 1, 2005, nearly 20,000 teachers—about a quarter of the UFT membership—packed Madison Square Garden for a rally at which Weingarten denounced Bloomberg and Klein, asked for a strike vote, and requested state arbitration. Contract talks resumed in August and September. A tentative contract was reached on October 3, 2005. The union won a wage increase of 14.25 percent over 52 months, retroactive to June 1, 2003. Other changes include a slightly longer workday (with the extra time devoted to tutoring) and the elimination of union control over some staffing decisions. The contract, ratified on November 3, 2005, passed with just 63 percent of UFT members in favor.

Weingarten concluded her third collective bargaining agreement on November 6, 2006, when the union and city reached a tentative deal to increase pay by 7.1 percent over two years. The agreement raised base pay for senior teachers above $100,000 a year, bringing city salaries in line with those in New York City's suburbs for the first time. The city did not seek any increases in the workday or workload or any other concessions, as it had with other unions. Negotiations over health benefits were to be conducted separately in talks with the Municipal Labor Committee, an umbrella group for municipal unions which Weingarten chairs.

Observers said Bloomberg sought an early contract in order to win UFT support in his struggle with Governor Eliot Spitzer over school funding. In October 2007, Weingarten assented to two agreements whereby the city and the UFT would jointly seek legislative approval for a new pension deal allowing teachers with 25 years of service to retire at age 55 and providing bonuses to all teachers in schools that showed a certain level of improvement in student achievement. In June 2009, Weingarten negotiated some pension modifications for new teachers in exchange for maintaining the age 55 pension and for allowing teachers to return to their traditional post-Labor Day start date.

=== New union headquarters ===
In 2003, Weingarten sold the UFT's headquarters at 260 Park Avenue South and two other buildings at 48 and 49 East 21st Street for $63.6 million and moved the union's offices to Lower Manhattan, purchasing a building at 50 Broadway for $53.75 million and leasing the building next to it, 52 Broadway, for 32 years. The UFT also financed a $40 million renovation of both buildings.

=== Organizing ===
The UFT represents all teachers, paraprofessional school employees, and professionals (such as school nurses, school psychologists, and others) in the New York City schools. The UFT saw some membership growth under Weingarten among these workers.

The UFT also has a registered nurse division which represents roughly 2,800 registered nurses at Lutheran Medical Center, Staten Island University Hospital-South, Jewish Home and Hospital Home Health Agency, and the Visiting Nurse Service of New York. The UFT saw more growth in this division, as the Visiting Nurse Service expanded, and the union organized non-RN units at the non-profit company.

Weingarten's largest organizing victory came when the UFT organized childcare providers in New York City. The campaign began in 2005 and concluded in 2007. The organizing drive—the largest successful union campaign in the city since 1960, when the United Federation of Teachers itself was formed—added 28,000 workers to the union's 113,000 active and 56,000 retired members.

== AFT presidency ==
On February 12, 2008, AFT President Edward J. McElroy announced he would retire at the union's regularly scheduled biennial convention in July. On July 14, Weingarten was elected to succeed him. She is the first openly gay individual to be elected president of a national American labor union.

=== Views ===
==== School reform ====
Weingarten advocates what she describes as a "bottom up" approach to education reform, and says that public officials should welcome the views—and account for the needs—of teachers when working to help schools better serve their students. She has, as AFT president, criticized state and federal reforms proposed by her opponents.

The AFT, during Weingarten's presidency, has focused scrutiny on well-funded third parties that have attempted to influence education policy—with the Walton Foundation, the largest philanthropic donor in the United States, drawing particular scrutiny. In a 2015 report co-authored with In the Public Interest, the AFT decried the Walton Foundation's pursuit of what the report termed a "market-based model [that] will lead to ... the eventual elimination of public education altogether, in favor of an across-the-board system of privately operated schools."

Weingarten was among 19 arrested in March 2013 while protesting a Philadelphia School Reform Commission meeting on school closures.

Neighborhood public schools, according to Weingarten, can coexist with charter schools—but she opposes initiatives that work to supplant the former with the latter. Weingarten sees the role of charters as complementary to, rather than competing with, other schools.

"Charter schools should be laboratories for innovation and creative ideas that can be scaled up so they can enrich communities," she has said.

In a 2013 debate in New Haven, Weingarten argued that charter schools pull money from regular school districts.

==== Standardized testing ====
Weingarten condemns a "fixation on testing and data over everything else" as "a fundamental flaw in how our nation approaches public education," but accepts the use of standardized tests as one tool among several to evaluate student achievement and teacher performance. As AFT president, she has criticized the No Child Left Behind Act for "allow[ing] high-stakes testing to eclipse all else, including the children themselves." In a 2015 op-ed for The New York Times, she wrote:

Tests should be used to get teachers, parents and school communities the information they need to help students make progress — not to sanction or scapegoat, as they do now with high-stakes tests driving federal education policy. Instead, we need investments to level the playing field for kids, boost innovation, elevate the teaching profession and support educators.

The Every Student Succeeds Act of 2015 (ESSA) passed into law with the AFT's support. The law eliminates the federal requirement that states evaluate teachers according to their students' standardized test scores, and allows states to weigh factors in addition to test scores when judging the performance of school systems. Weingarten has applauded the ESSA for "relegating the era of test-and-punish strategies to the trash heap" and for offering "teachers ... flexibility to try new ways to teach, to meet the needs of their students, and to help their students think critically and analytically instead of focusing on what might be on a high-stakes test." As AFT president, Weingarten favored the act particularly because of provisions that stripped the United States Secretary of Education's role in influencing teacher-evaluation systems and maintained federal funding Title I for schools with high proportions of students from low-income households.

==== Teacher training and retention ====
An overemphasis on standardized testing and a shortage of resources, according to Weingarten, has harmed efforts to recruit and retain well-prepared teachers at public schools. "A haphazard approach to the complex and crucial enterprise of educating children," she has written, "[is] unfair to both students and teachers, who want and need to be well-prepared to teach from their first day on the job." In response to a New York Times story about public school systems short of teaching staff, she said that "teachers are used to the pressure cooker but are stressed out because they aren't getting the support, resources, time and respect they need to do their jobs."

Weingarten has proposed—as a means of improving the quality of teachers in American classrooms—the creation of a professional licensing exam, akin to the bar exam taken by lawyers, for new teachers. "Better preparing teachers for entry into the profession," Weingarten says, "will dramatically reduce the loss of new teachers—nearly half of whom leave after fewer than five years—and the loss of knowledge that goes with it."

==== Poverty and community schools ====
The AFT, under Weingarten's leadership, has worked to draw attention to economic inequalities within cities and regions that can hobble public schools. With school systems in the United States heavily reliant on local property taxes, systems that rely on depressed or depleted tax bases can find themselves without the financial resources available to comparatively wealthier districts.

Philanthropic efforts in public schools, in Weingarten's view, have incorrectly focused on the educator's role in student performance—"what we now know is 10% of student achievement," she remarked in one interview—to the exclusion of underlying problems, such as poverty, that undermine student progress. "We need to ... treat kids that have the least, give them the most," says Weingarten—"not with a blank check, but actually figure out the supports they need so that they can climb up the ladder of opportunity."

During Weingarten's presidency, the AFT has pushed for creating what the union calls "community schools": schools that serve as hubs for non-academic programs addressed to whole communities. Undergirding that concept is the understanding—as described by former Boston Public Schools superintendent Thomas Payzant, who implemented a community-school model in the city, in a 2005 book—that "students' noneducational realities, such as nutritional deficiencies, medical problems, safety concerns, even daily hunger, are daunting barriers that can obstruct even the most flexible educational program."

To address those perceived needs, community schools offer 'wraparound services' that target identified social issues: job banks to help parents secure employment, for example, or housing counseling for families that lack permanent homes. In a 2008 address given during her first run for the AFT presidency, Weingarten said, in the course of promoting the community-school paradigm:

Imagine schools that are open all day and offer after-school and evening recreational activities, child care and preschool, tutoring and homework assistance. Schools that include dental, medical and counseling clinics ... Imagine if schools had the educational resources children need to thrive, like smaller classes and individualized instruction, plentiful, up-to-date materials and technology anchored to that rich curriculum, decent facilities, an early start for toddlers and a nurturing atmosphere.

The AFT has extolled community schools that operate in Philadelphia, Cincinnati, St. Paul, Minn., Austin, Texas, Providence, R.I., and other cities where the union represents public schoolteachers. The union has itself sponsored community school efforts in Chicago, and in West Virginia, the AFT has launched a public-private partnership—called Reconnecting McDowell—that aims to "enhance educational opportunity for children in the McDowell County public schools in Central Appalachia, while addressing the underlying problems caused by severe and chronic poverty and economic decline." Efforts through the program have included the building of a "teacher village" for educators, setup of an internship program for high-school students, and mentoring of students from families in which they would be the first to attend college.

==== Teacher tenure ====
Weingarten has resisted attempts to curtail or eliminate tenure protections for public-school teachers, arguing that the outright removal of tenure protection would hurt the quality of classroom instruction. "We know that the states with the highest academic performance have the strongest due process protections for teachers," Weingarten wrote to Time magazine in 2014. "Research shows that our most at-risk kids need more-experienced teachers. But why would these teachers stay at schools with few tools, little support and no ability to voice their concerns?"

Education policy proposals built around eliminating tenure have drawn derision from Weingarten as "faddish reforms" at the expense of what she terms "the most critical issues confronting American education": teacher training, education funding, school safety, and educational reinforcement at home. She downplays the idea of worker protections as obstacles to improving schools, describing tenure "not a job for life, [but] ensuring fairness and due process before someone can be fired, plain and simple."

When United States Secretary of Education Arne Duncan issued a statement siding with a California superior court judge who ruled the state's teacher tenure protections unconstitutional, Weingarten responded that Duncan had "added to the polarization" in debates over education policy, and charged that focusing on "quick fixes, blame games or silver bullets" such as ending tenure had "set us back in our effort to help all kids succeed." The AFT has worked, however, to reshape tenure in some states. In 2011 Weingarten offered a plan that would rely on a teacher-evaluation system with multiple parts—including assessment of student improvement on tests—to give tenured teachers rated unsatisfactory one year to improve, and allow the firing of teachers who fail to meet that deadline within the next 100 days. The proposal followed a 2008 agreement between Weingarten and District of Columbia public schools chancellor Michelle Rhee that allowed the termination of Washington Teachers' Union members evaluated as ineffective, after a one-year period—and in public remarks, Weingarten has discussed her role in efforts to modernize tenure elsewhere.

==== Pensions and retirement ====
Under Weingarten, the AFT has combatted efforts to shift responsibility for retirement investing to teachers—with Weingarten herself drawing notoriety, according to Institutional Investor magazine, as "the most public face in the battle for defined benefit pension funds." In a 2014 op-ed, Weingarten attacked "people who press ... to convert defined benefit pensions to 401(k) plans," asserting that advocates of 401(k) plans "never talk about the benefits retirees are likely to get under these new plans — because it's likely to be a lot less than retirees need to get by."

In its campaign against moving teachers into defined-contribution pensions, AFT has argued that shifting investment risks to individuals has led to deleterious results for retirees. Hedge funds that manage teacher pension investments have drawn heavy criticism from AFT; the union, in 2015, prepared a report that concluded such investments "exacted a high cost, had laggard returns and generally moved in tandem with the overall stock market." The report came in the wake of a 2013 AFT study that charged some hedge-fund managers with a conflict of interest—according to BuzzFeed, the 2013 report said that while managing teachers' defined benefit pensions, some fund managers had "support[ed] groups like the Manhattan Institute, which has recommended replacing pensions with 401(k)-type plans, and Students First, whose national branch advocates eliminating defined-benefit plans."

==== Israel ====
Weingarten is a longtime critic of the Boycott, Divestment and Sanctions movement. Despite her opposition to BDS, she has said that she and the AFT should not intervene against pro-BDS actions taken at the local level. Identifying as a "progressive Zionist" and a "Ramahnik", Weingarten has frequently criticized the Israeli government in the belief that Israeli society should be more "inclusive and democratic."

== Political activities ==
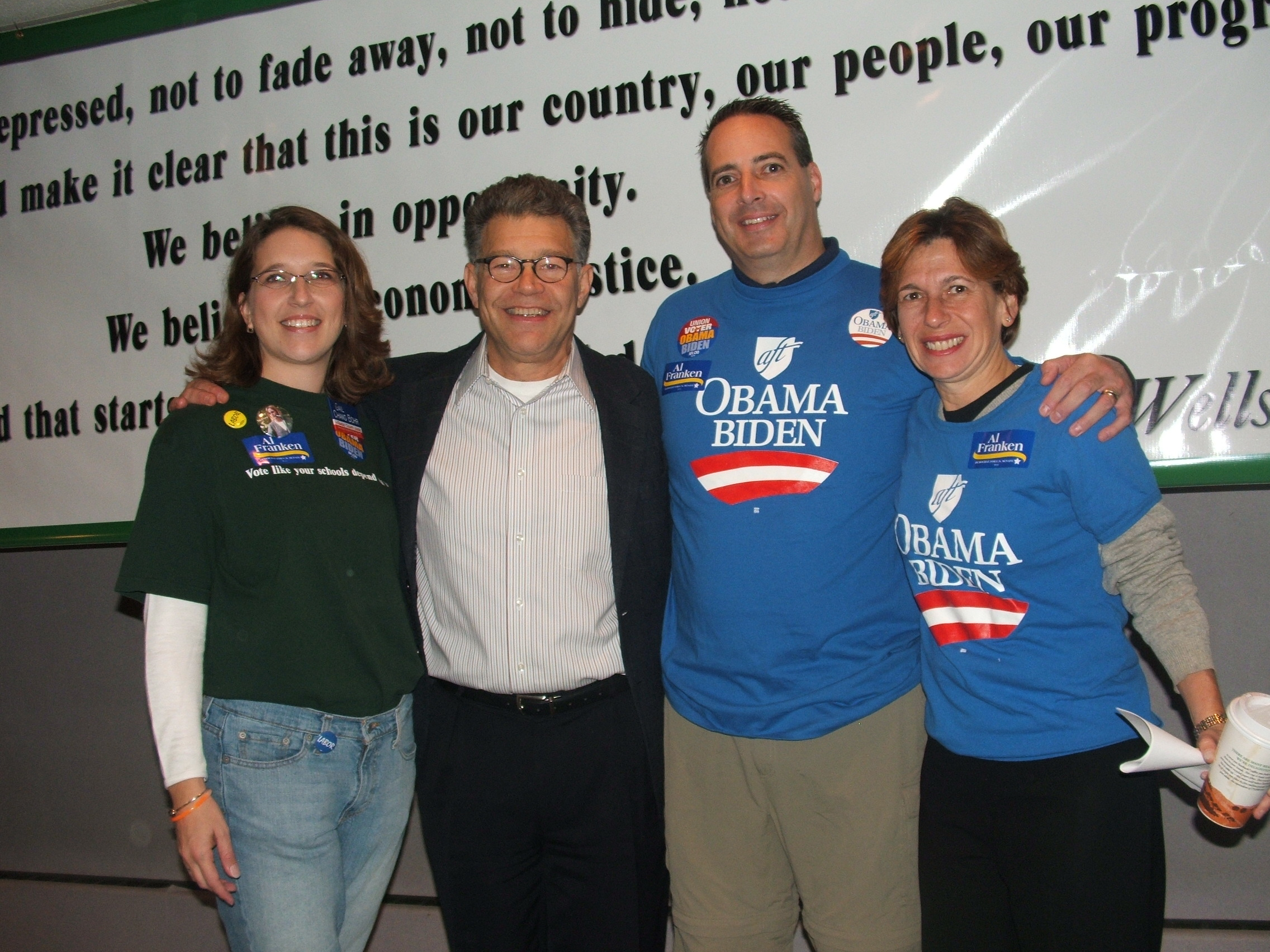
Randi Weingarten (far right) with Democratic former Senator Al Franken

Weingarten and the UFT endorsed Republican George Pataki for re-election as Governor of New York in 2002 Julia Levy reported in the New York Sun on February 1, 2005, that candidates for mayor of New York were meeting with Weingarten, and "political experts" were saying that "Weingarten has become something of a kingmaker." The UFT's endorsement, wrote Levy, meant "votes, campaign volunteers, and information."

A lifelong Democrat, Weingarten was a member of the Democratic National Committee (DNC) from 2002 until her resignation in mid 2025. She was an early and critically important supporter of Howard Dean as Chairman of the DNC. She is a superdelegate who was pledged to Hillary Clinton during the 2008 presidential primary. In January 2009, she was mentioned as a possible candidate in the appointment process to replace Clinton's U.S. Senate seat.

In one of the Wikileaks emails from John Podesta, chair of the Hillary Clinton campaign, Weingarten states her desire to "go after" the National Nurses United union after their endorsement of Senator Bernie Sanders for President of the United States.

In 2020, Weingarten was named a candidate for Secretary of Education in the Biden administration. She was an elector for the State of New York in the 2020 United States presidential election.

Weingarten serves on the board of directors of Voters of Tomorrow, an advocacy organization that promotes political engagement among Generation Z.

== Criticism ==
=== Public school governance and oversight ===
In spring 1998 in the City Journal, the quarterly magazine of the Manhattan Institute think tank, Sol Stern dismissed Weingarten's claim to support school reform as "pure union propaganda."

Pundit John Stossel wrote, in an opinion piece in the New York Sun, about a rally held by Weingarten at Madison Square Garden at which teachers demanded "a new contract and more money." Stossel said that the teachers' unions "can pay for expensive rallies at 'the world's most famous arena' because every teacher in a unionized district like New York must give up some of his salary to the union. Even teachers who don't like the union, teachers who believe in school choice, and teachers who could make more on the open market must fork over their money to support the unions that fight against school choice and merit pay."

In an opinion piece in the New York Sun, Andrew Wolf wrote that Mayor Bloomberg had called the UFT the "number one" obstacle to education reform but had reached a compromise with a coalition including the UFT, ACORN, and the Working Families Party. Wolf said that Weingarten, speaking to parent groups in a conference call, had called Department of Education officials "absolute and complete assholes" who "can't be trusted."

On September 30, 2009, in the City Journal, Sol Stern asserted that "the UFT and the Bloomberg administration [had] increasingly developed a cartel-like working relationship, with New York taxpayers paying the price."

Reacting on July 7, 2009, to Weingarten's statement, upon taking control of the AFT, that New York City is "the best laboratory in the world for trying new things," The Wall Street Journal asserted this could be true "if it weren't for Ms. Weingarten's union," and wrote that the UFT under her direction had done everything possible "to block significant reforms to New York's public schools."

In a 2009 essay by Steven Brill in The New Yorker, New York City Schools Chancellor Joel Klein was quoted as calling the teacher tenure policies defended by the UFT "ridiculous"—with Klein asserting that "the three principles that govern our system are lockstep compensation, seniority, and tenure. All three are not right for our children." Brill attributed to "many education reformers" the belief "that the U.F.T. and its political allies had gained so much clout" over the years "that it had become impossible for the city's Board of Education, which already shared a lot of power with local boards, to maintain effective school oversight." However, Brill later reversed his view of Weingarten, and proposed that New York City Mayor Michael Bloomberg appoint her chancellor of the school system.

=== Raising salaries and merit pay ===
During her tenure as UFT president, Weingarten pushed for higher salaries and improved training for teachers, often agreeing to longer workdays and more tutoring time in order to win better pay. Between 2002 and 2007, salaries for New York City teachers rose 42 percent. Weingarten has endorsed merit pay for city teachers, and in 2007 negotiated a controversial contract which paid teachers bonuses if their students' test scores rose.

Nicole Gelinas wrote in the conservative City Journal on June 16, 2005, that "Weingarten declared that merit-pay plans 'pit teachers against each other instead of encouraging a collaborative school culture.' What Weingarten and the union do not see ... is that competition is healthy." Gelinas went on to assert that "until Weingarten budges ... virtue will have to be its own reward for New York's teachers."

Andrew Wolf, in an October 19, 2007, op-ed in the New York Sun entitled "Socialism for Schools," argued that despite some observers' perception that "Mayor Bloomberg and Chancellor Klein [had] won a victory over the teachers' union by gaining approval of a merit pay scheme," the real winner was Weingarten, who had gained power for the UFT. The new plan, Wolf asserted, did not reward individual performance but treated each school as a collective, with union committees dividing bonuses among all union members, including school secretaries and others.

In October 2012, after what the New York Times called "months of intense and late-night negotiations," Weingarten and New Jersey Governor Chris Christie reached a "landmark compromise," agreeing on a new contract for teachers in the Newark school system. Although, as the Times noted, Weingarten "had criticized what she calls 'merit pay schemes,'" she "agreed to embrace the concept in exchange for a promise that teachers would have a rare role in evaluating performance." After this agreement was reached, supporters of merit pay for New York City public-school teachers expressed hope that the UFT, which had "always opposed individual merit pay initiatives," would now follow Weingarten's example.

Also in 2012, Weingarten criticized what she calls "merit pay schemes".

=== Teacher tenure ===
In a February 2011 interview, Weingarten acknowledged that "tenure needs to be reformed," noting that the AFT had adopted recommendations for tenure reform. Observing that the issue of teacher tenure had "erupted recently, with many districts anticipating layoffs because of slashed budgets" and with mayors such as Michael R. Bloomberg in New York City and Cory A. Booker in Newark "attack[ing] seniority laws," the New York Times reported that Weingarten had agreed to support some kind of tenure reform.

=== Teacher pension plans ===
Weingarten has strongly supported defined-benefit pension plans for teachers. Sol Stern argued in the conservative City Journal on June 25, 2009, that an agreement reached between Weingarten and the Bloomberg administration on teacher pensions would "probably wind up harming Gotham's students." Under the agreement, Stern asserted, teachers would "make no sacrifices to help ease the city's economic and fiscal crisis" and would even get "a shorter work year," with a ten-and-a-half-week summer vacation.

In April 2013, the Wall Street Journal editorial board painted Weingarten as "trying to strong-arm pension trustees not to invest in hedge funds or private-equity funds that support education reform." Weingarten had, according to the editorial board, "tried to sandbag hedge fund investor Dan Loeb at a conference sponsored by the Council of Institutional Investors," describing her as troubled by the fact "that Mr. Loeb puts his own money behind school reform and charter schools."

Weingarten had, according to the Journal editorial, demanded a meeting with Loeb at the conference, but the editorial board wrote that he had "wisely declined the honor of showing up for this political mugging." This "attempted ambush," continued the Journal editorial, "coincide[d] with a new report that her union sent to pension trustees this week called 'Ranking Asset Managers,'" with the rankings based not on "return on investment" but on such matters "as a manager's position on collective bargaining, privatization [read: vouchers] or proposals to discontinue providing benefits through defined benefit plans." The editorial board imputed "Ms. Weingarten's union fury" to her "know[ing that] unions are losing the moral and political debate over reform, as more Americans conclude that her policies are consigning millions of children to a life of diminished opportunity." Weingarten had "bull[ied] pension trustees to bully hedge funds," the editorial board charged, "to cut off funding for poor kids in Harlem. Every time we wonder if we're too cynical about unions, they remind us that we're not nearly cynical enough."

=== School choice and charter schools ===
Weingarten has opposed charter schools and school choice. In a City Journal essay in 1999, Sol Stern contrasted "Milwaukee's healthy approach to school choice" with what he termed Weingarten's promise to "fight with every resource at [her] disposal any attempt by the mayor to create a voucher system" in New York. Given what Stern described as the UFT's "impressive" resources, he deemed Mayor Giuliani courageous to take on "what promises to be," Stern opined, "a long fight for the beleaguered parents of New York's schoolchildren."

In a 2023 interview, Ms. Weingarten stated, "Those same words that you heard in terms of wanting segregation post-Brown v. Board of Education, those same words you hear today," in an apparent reference to advocates for "school choice" and "parental rights." In response, US Sen. Tim Scott accused Weingarten of racism saying he could not "think of anything more racist than teachers' unions trapping poor black kids in failing schools in blue cities." In the same interview, Weingarten also stated, "They want to have basically a Christian ideology, their particular Christian ideology, dominate the country, as opposed to a country that was born on the freedom of the exercise of religion." Catholic League president Bill Donohue responded, saying that "[t]he hatred that she has for millions of school choice and parental rights advocates especially those who are Christian disqualifies her from serving in any public role."

=== Teacher accountability ===
Weingarten has been criticized over the years for resisting attempts to address the problem of teacher incompetence.

=== Private-school tax credits ===
Weingarten has been a critic of proposals to allow parents to use tax credits to help pay to send their children to private school. In November 2006, editors of the New York Sun quoted Weingarten's statement that allowing parents to apply tax credits to private-school tuition was "like saying government should reimburse people who drink bottled water instead of tap water — or those who park in a garage even when there is space on the street." The Sun noted that "bottled water and garage parking are luxuries, more expensive than tap water or street parking," while educating a child in a New York Catholic school, for example, costs one-quarter as much as educating a public-school student.

=== Class size ===
Smaller class sizes have also been a major initiative of the UFT under Weingarten. She attempted to tie smaller class sizes to salaries in each of the three collective bargaining agreements she has negotiated, and linked class size to school repair and rebuilding issues. In 2003, Weingarten and the UFT pushed for a change to the New York City Charter which would force the city to reduce class sizes. The charter revision became caught in lawsuits and was eventually dropped, although Weingarten continued to advocate for smaller class sizes.

=== Teacher seniority ===
Weingarten has been a staunch supporter of the LIFO policy ("last in, first out"), otherwise known as teacher seniority. Asked in a 2011 Wall Street Journal interview about LIFO, Weingarten defended it, saying: "It's not the perfect mechanism but it's the best mechanism we have. You have cronyism and corruption and discrimination issues. We're saying let's do things the right way. We don't want to see people getting laid off based on who they know instead of what they know. We don't want to see people get laid off based on how much they cost."

=== School building conditions ===
Poor schooling conditions, namely run-down public schools, have also drawn Weingarten's attention. The city of New York has neglected building conditions for many years.

=== Subsidized housing for teachers ===
In October 2007, the New York Sun wrote that a new Bronx apartment complex would be open only to UFT members: "Our members have said we want to live in the city and raise our families in the city, but we can't afford it, so this is something we've been looking at for a while," Weingarten said.

=== Teacher dress codes ===
Sol Stern wrote in the Summer 1998 issue of City Journal about Weingarten's opposition to a proposed dress code for teachers, calling it "a diversion from the real job at hand."

=== Plagiarized speech ===
A speech that Weingarten gave in 2011 turned out to have been plagiarized from a NY1 series on a flawed Board of Education computer system. NY1 responded, saying "When a journalist, politician or student uses someone else's words without attribution in a speech or a paper, it's called plagiarism – and it's often enough to get a journalist fired, a politician embarrassed or a student kicked out of school".

=== WTU conflict ===
In 2010, the AFT and Weingarten specifically were charged with interfering in the local elections of the Washington Teachers Union (WTU). The elections had been scheduled for May but postponed because of a dispute over procedural questions. In August of that year, Weingarten imposed a deadline on WTU President George Parker to comply with an order "to hold a mid-September election for new officers and delegates, or the contest will be taken out of his hands and conducted by the national parent organization." Parker objected that Weingarten had no authority to interfere in this manner. Weingarten ultimately took over the election.

=== COVID-19 pandemic and school closures ===
In April 2020, as the COVID-19 pandemic was beginning to take hold in the United States, schools and most public life were placed under lockdown. The AFT released a five-stage reopening framework, and through the summer of 2020 Weingarten opposed the Trump administration's push to reopen schools, threatening "safety strikes" if reopening conditions were deemed unsafe.

Weingarten and AFT staff influenced CDC Director Rochelle Walensky's February 2021 school-reopening policy. Records later obtained by the United States House Select Subcommittee on the Coronavirus Pandemic showed the AFT received a pre-publication draft of the guidance and submitted their own edits. Two AFT suggestions appeared nearly verbatim in the final document. CDC officials later testified that soliciting and incorporating line-by-line edits from outside organizations was "uncommon." Walensky stated the guidance was "free from political meddling" and that CDC had consulted with more than 50 organizations.

2022 NAEP scores showed the largest decline in decades. Weingarten testified before the Republican-led Select Subcommittee on April 26, 2023, rejecting that the AFT had undue influence and stating the union had worked "every day from February on" to reopen schools. Outgoing Chicago Mayor Lori Lightfoot disputed that characterization on CNN, saying it was "not the reality that was happening on the ground." In a February 2021 Axios on HBO interview, Weingarten dismissed concerns about school closures, saying "kids are resilient and kids will recover." In a 2023 New York Times Magazine profile, she reversed that position, telling Jonathan Mahler: "All of us were wrong when we said, 'Oh, no, there's no learning loss.'"

== Personal life ==
On October 11, 2007, Weingarten publicly announced she is a lesbian. Weingarten introduced Liz Margolies, a psychotherapist and health care activist, as her partner while accepting the Empire State Pride Agenda's 2007 Community Service Award from Christine Quinn. By December 2012, she was in a relationship with Rabbi Sharon Kleinbaum of Congregation Beit Simchat Torah. They married March 25, 2018.

In December 2014, Weingarten wrote in Jezebel that she had almost been raped just after her junior year in college. In 2023, Representative Marjorie Taylor Greene (R-Ga.) asked her if she was a mother; she responded that she was a mother by marriage.

Non-profit organization positions
Preceded by Sandra Feldman	President of the United Federation of Teachers; 1998–2008	Succeeded by Michael Mulgrew
Preceded by Edward J. McElroy	President of the American Federation of Teachers; 2008–present	Incumbent
