= Mary Cornelia Barker =

1879-1963 schoolteacher and teachers' union leader

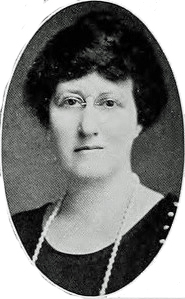
- Born: January 20, 1879; Rockmart, Georgia
- Died: September 15, 1963 (aged 84); Atlanta, Georgia
- Education: Agnes Scott College
- Occupations: Educator, labor activist

Mary Cornelia Barker (1879 – 1963) was an American educator and labor activist. She was the president of the American Federation of Teachers from 1925 through 1931.

== Biography ==
Barker was born on January 20, 1879, in Rockmart, Georgia. She graduated from Agnes Scott College in 1909. Barker began teaching in the Atlanta Public Schools in 1904. She worked at several school in Atlanta, including serving as principal in three schools from 1921 through 1944, the year she retired.

In 1905 Barker began her involvement in the labor movement, specifically working on salary scale and improving working conditions with the Atlanta Public School Teachers’ Association (APSTA). In 1919 APSTA became affiliated with the American Federation of Teachers (AFT). Barker was also a member of the Atlanta Federation of Trades and the Georgia Federation of Labor. Barker helped establish the Summer School for Women Workers in Atlanta, Georgia. That program provided train in labor organization for women working in various industries like textiles.

In addition to her labor activism Barker was a member of many civic organizations such as the Atlanta League of Women Voters and the Southern Conference for Human Welfare, the Atlanta Urban League, and the Atlanta Commission on Interracial Cooperation.

Barker died on September 15, 1963, in Atlanta, Georgia.
