= Sandra Feldman =

American educator and labor leader

- Born: Sandra Abramowitz; October 13, 1939; Brooklyn, New York
- Died: September 18, 2005 (aged 65)
- Occupations: Educator, labor leader

Sandra Feldman (née Abramowitz; October 13, 1939 – September 18, 2005) was an American educator and labor leader who served as president of the American Federation of Teachers (AFT) from 1997 to 2004.

== Early life ==
Born Sandra Abramowitz in Coney Island in Brooklyn, New York, in 1939, her father was a milkman who played violin until work made his fingers too thick and calloused to play music. Her mother worked part-time in a bakery, but was often ill. The Abramowitz family was extremely poor; at first, Sandra and her two siblings grew up in a tenement, although the family eventually moved into public housing as their finances worsened. She attended James Madison High School in the New York City public school system. She entered Brooklyn College (which at the time offered free tuition), where she studied English literature. She became active in socialist politics and the Civil Rights Movement. When she was 17 years old, she met civil rights activist Bayard Rustin, who became her mentor and close friend. During her early years in the Civil Rights Movement, Feldman worked to integrate Howard Johnson's restaurants in Maryland. She soon became employment committee chairwoman of the Congress of Racial Equality in Harlem.She also participated in several Freedom Rides, and was arrested twice.

In 1958, while working for the Brooklyn College literary magazine, she met and married Paul Feldman. Paul Feldman later became editor of the socialist magazine "New America" and a member of the Socialist Party's national executive committee. The couple divorced in 1975. They had no children. In 1980, she married Arthur H. Barnes, former president of the New York Urban Coalition, who was the father of two children.

== Teaching career ==
Upon graduation in 1962, Feldman worked for six months as a substitute third grade teacher in a public school in East Harlem. But she realized she did not have adequate training and entered graduate school in 1963. From 1963 to 1966, Feldman worked to obtain a master's degree in literature at New York University. She continued to be active in the Civil Rights Movement, participating in the March on Washington for Jobs and Freedom in 1963. While in graduate school, Feldman worked as a fourth grade teacher at Public School 34 on the New York City's Lower East Side. She immediately joined the AFT (which had only one other member at the school), even though New York City teachers had won collective bargaining rights in 1961. She organized the entire school staff within a year. During this time, Feldman became an associate of Albert Shanker, then an organizer for the United Federation of Teachers.

== Union career ==
In 1966, on the recommendation of Rustin, Shanker—now executive director of the UFT—hired Feldman as a full-time field representative. Over the next nine years, Feldman became the union's executive director and oversaw its staff. She was elected its secretary (the second-most powerful position in the local) in 1983. After just two years on the UFT staff, Feldman played a crucial role in the Ocean Hill-Brownsville strike. The city of New York had designated the Ocean Hill-Brownsville area of Brooklyn as one of three decentralized school districts in an effort to give the minority community more say in school affairs. Many observers argued that the decentralization experiment was a canard: Little educational advancement for the poverty-stricken students of Ocean Hill-Brownsville could be achieved without additional resources, yet the city provided none. The crisis began when the Ocean Hill-Brownsville governing board fired 13 teachers for allegedly sabotaging the decentralization experiment. Shanker demanded that specific charges be filed and the teachers given a chance to defend themselves in due process proceedings. A protracted fight erupted between those in the community who supported the Ocean Hill-Brownsville board and those supported the UFT. A series of illegal strikes occurred between September 9 and November 17, 1968. Many supporters of the local school board resorted to racial invective. Shanker was branded a racist, and many African-Americans accused the UFT of being "Jewish-dominated".

Feldman was often at the center of the strike. She had been involved in early negotiations over additional funding for the independent school, and Ocean Hill-Brownsville principal Rhody McCoy alleged that Feldman had not objected to the disciplinary actions at the time they were made. In many respects, Feldman was the UFT's point-person on the ground in Ocean Hill-Brownsville. But she was in a difficult personal position. She was writing newspaper op-eds and giving statements attacking the New York Civil Liberties Union, militant black teachers opposed to the UFT's strikes, and minority parents' groups—people she had worked closely with just a few years before. Feldman was deeply conflicted by her role in the strikes, and hurt by accusations of racial insensitivity. Shanker was elected president of the AFT in 1974, but retained his post as president of the UFT. In 1986, with UFT members concerned that Shanker was unable to attend to his responsibilities as president of both the AFT and UFT, Shanker retired as UFT president. Feldman was elected president in his stead.

== Tenure at AFT ==
Feldman had been elected an AFT vice president in 1974, serving on the national union's executive council and the executive council's executive committee. She was also chair of the AFT's Educational Issues Program and Policy Council, a constitutionally mandated body which advised the AFT executive council on teacher issues. When Al Shanker died in February 1997 from brain and lung cancer, the AFT executive council appointed Feldman president in May of that year. She ran for and won election as the AFT's president in July 1998, becoming the union's first female president since 1930. At the UFT, Feldman's long-time counsel Randi Weingarten was elected president. In May 1997, Feldman was elected to the AFL-CIO executive council and appointed to the executive council's executive committee. During her tenure at the head of the AFT, Feldman also served as a vice president of Education International and was a board member of the International Rescue Committee and Freedom House as well as numerous other charities and foundations. She faced a number of significant challenges in her first two years in office. The first was to oversee a vote concerning a proposed merger with the National Education Association (NEA). Merger had been proposed at various times since the 1960s but had gained ground in 1995. A "no-raid" pact was signed by the two unions in which they pledged to not raid one another's locals in an effort to cool off decades of bad blood. Terms of the merger were agreed to and approved by the AFT executive council in February 1998. But NEA delegates rejected the pact the following July, a majority of delegates voting in favor of the agreement but not by the required two-thirds majority needed to approve merger.

Feldman continued to advocate merger. She oversaw several state and local merger efforts, particularly in Minnesota, Montana and Florida. The AFT and NEA also continued to work together on federal education policy, and renewed their no-raid pact regularly. A second challenge was organizational. Feldman pushed for and won convention approval for the addition of an executive vice president for the AFT, the first new executive officer to be added to the union's governing structure in its history. In late July 1998, about 3,500 members of the AFT's health care division, almost all of them in Rhode Island, disaffiliated due to a disagreement about the union's willingness to spend money organizing new members. 1998 also saw Feldman undertake a systematic review of the AFT's organization and priorities. In 1992, the union had established a "Futures Committee" to engage in a similar review, and the new "Futures II" committee was charged with building on the report of the "Futures I" report.

The committee's work began in mid-1998 and concluded in early 2000. The "Futures II" committee's final report, approved by AFT delegates in July 2000, advocated a four-point plan: 1) building a "culture of organizing" throughout the union, 2) enhancing the union's political advocacy efforts, 3) engaging in a series of publicity, legislative, funding and political campaigns to strengthen the institutions in which AFT members work, and 4) recommitting the AFT to fostering democratic education and human rights at home and abroad. Feldman moved quickly to ensure that the plan was implemented, establishing several new executive council committees (including, for the first time, an Organizing Committee) and task forces and seeking further constitutional and organizational changes to the union's political fund-raising efforts. The AFT had opposed the election of John Sweeney as AFL-CIO president in 1995. While Feldman supported Sweeney's efforts to encourage new organizing and restructure the umbrella group, she was also sharply and publicly critical of the Sweeney administration's interference in the internal politics of the Teamsters union. Feldman's position on the AFL-CIO executive council was strengthened when AFT secretary-treasurer Edward J. McElroy was elected to that body in December 2001.

Feldman was diagnosed with breast cancer in October 2002. After treatment, she returned to full-time work with the union early the next year. In 2003, Feldman proposed a major educational policy initiative, known as "Kindergarten-Plus." The program would extend kindergarten to children as young as three years of age, expand the kindergarten school day, and reduce kindergarten class sizes. The goal was to better prepare children for entry into the first grade and help overcome some of the debilitating effects poverty had on young children. Although well-received, only one state (New Mexico) had enacted a Kindergarten-Plus program two years later. In the fall of 2003, Feldman was again diagnosed with cancer. She announced in March 2004 that she would retire as president of the AFT at its regular biennial convention in July. Edward J. McElroy, secretary-treasurer of the AFT since 1992, was elected the next president of the union.

Sandra Feldman died on September 18, 2005, at the age 65. She was survived by her second husband, Arthur Barnes (an insurance executive), two stepchildren, two grandchildren, and her brother and sister.

== Notes ==
Non-profit organization positions
Preceded by Albert Shanker	President of the United Federation of Teachers; 1986–1998	Succeeded by Randi Weingarten
Preceded by Albert Shanker	President of the American Federation of Teachers; 1997–2004	Succeeded by Edward J. McElroy
