= Albert Shanker Institute =

Non-Profit Organisation

- Abbreviation: ASI
- Formation: 1998
- Type: Nonprofit
- Headquarters: Washington, D.C., United States
- President: Randi Weingarten
- Key people: Mary Cathryn Ricker, Executive Director
- Revenue: $1,229,193 (2014)
- Expenses: $1,589,449 (2014)
- Website: www.shankerinstitute.org

The Albert Shanker Institute (ASI) is a nonprofit, nonpartisan organization dedicated to three themes: excellence in public education, unions as advocates for quality, and freedom of association in the public life of democracies. Its mission is to generate ideas, foster candid exchanges, and promote constructive policy proposals related to these issues. Toward these ends, ASI conducts original research, sponsors research, and organizes conferences and conversations in its three theme areas. It encourages open debate, bringing together influential decision makers from business, labor, government, and education sectors.

The Institute was founded in 1998 and is named for Albert Shanker, the late president of the American Federation of Teachers (AFT). It is funded in part by the AFT and in part by an endowment, and is housed at the AFT headquarters in Washington, D.C.

ASI has a five-member staff, and is led by an independent Board of Directors composed of educators, business representatives, labor leaders, academics, and public policy analysts. The Board also includes AFT president Randi Weingarten (who also serves as ASI's president) and AFT secretary-treasurer Fedrick Ingram (who is also ASI's secretary-treasurer). Mary Cathryn Ricker is the Institute's current Executive Director. Previous Executive Directors were Leo Casey and Eugenia Kemble.

In September 2013, the Shanker Institute and the National Black Justice Coalition announced they were jointly sponsoring a new Bayard Rustin Fellowship. The fellowship will be hosted by the Shanker Institute, and will encourage the advocacy, policy development, and research in three areas:

1. elimination of discrimination and bullying against students;
2. educational programs that encourage tolerance and respect for socio-economic differences; and
3. the full integration of American schools.
