= Clara Barton High School =

Public school in New York City

Coordinates: 40°40′12.2″N 73°57′41.5″W

Clara Barton High School for Health Professions
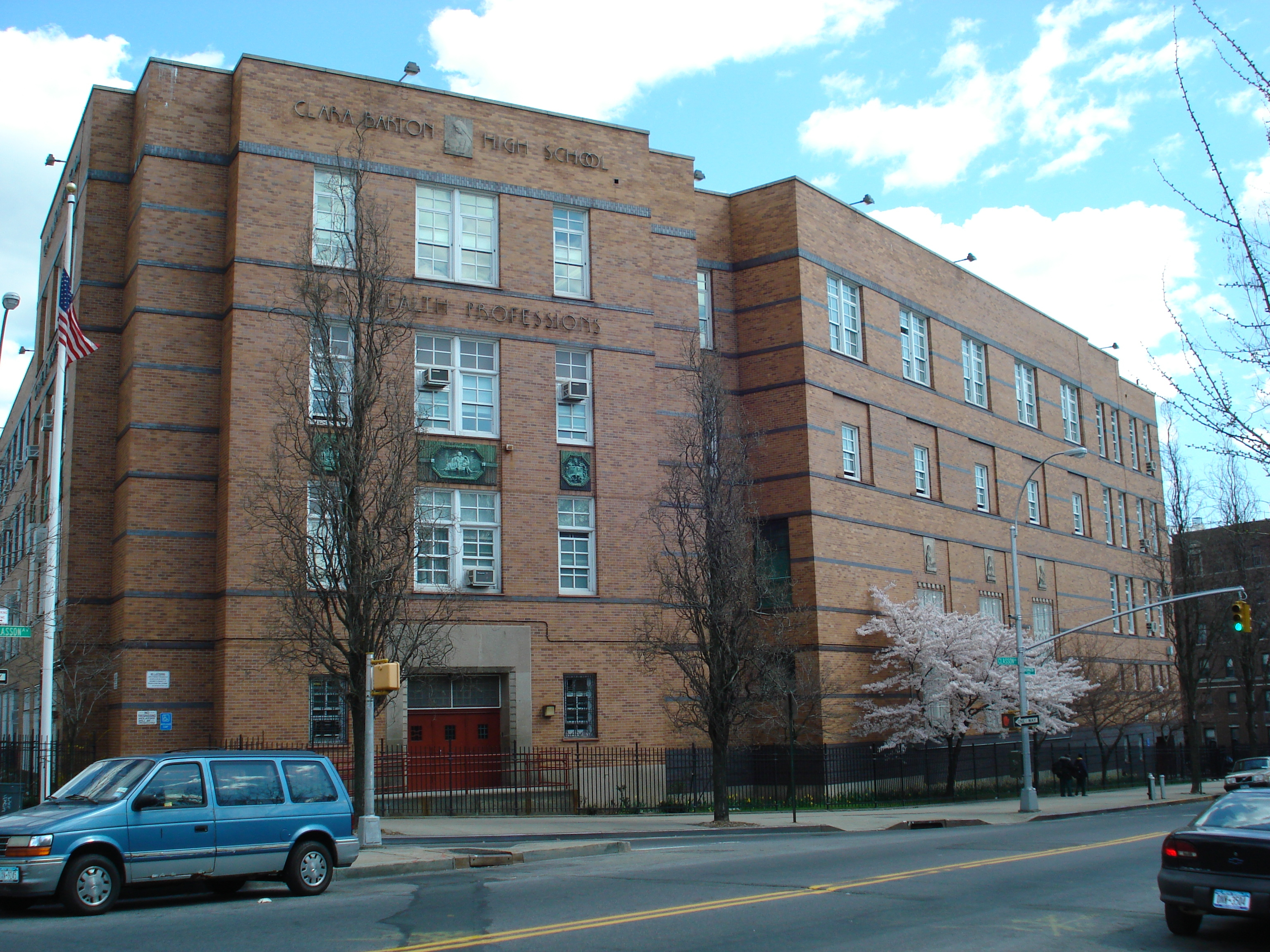
- Clara Barton High School in April 2008.

Location
- 901 Classon Ave, Brooklyn, NY 11225; Brooklyn, New York; United States

Information
- Type: Public
- School board: New York City Department of Education
- School number: K600
- Principal: Richard Forman
- Teaching staff: 94.95 (FTE)
- Grades: 9–12
- Enrollment: 1,178 (2022-2023)
- Student to teacher ratio: 12.41
- Website: http://www.clarabartonhs.org

Clara Barton High School for Health Professions is a public high school in Crown Heights, Brooklyn, New York City, that teaches from 9th - 12th grade. It is located at 901 Classon Avenue, across from the Brooklyn Museum and the Brooklyn Botanic Garden. The school is named for Clara Barton, an American teacher, nurse, and humanitarian. Like all New York City public schools, Clara Barton High School is operated by the New York City Department of Education.

Clara Barton High School for Health Professions has an array of health profession programs including Licensed Practical Nursing, Medical Assisting, Nursing Assisting, Dental Lab, Dental Assisting, Pharmacy Assisting, and EMT.

Up until the 1990s, all students joined a health profession, and are still encouraged to do so. Clara Barton High School for Health Professions has a clinical Program, which allows seniors in certain health careers to work in a hospital for half their day or work a week and go to school for a week. Students can graduate as a licensed practical nurse and get a job in a hospital after graduation. They also can be certified to work in any of the other majors upon graduation.

Many accelerated courses are offered, through the Gateway Honors Program, including advanced placement courses such as AP Biology, A.P. English, and AP United States History. Gateway offers rigorous course instruction to prepare for college.
