= Ohio Federation of Teachers =

Federation of unions in Ohio

- Ohio Federation of Teachers
- Founded: May 26, 1933
- Headquarters: Columbus, Ohio
- Location: United States
- Members: 20,000
- Key people: Melissa Cropper, president
- Parent organization: AFT
- Affiliations: AFT, AFL–CIO
- Website: http://oh.aft.org/

The Ohio Federation of Teachers (OFT) is a statewide federation of unions in Ohio, affiliated with the American Federation of Teachers (AFT), AFL–CIO.

The OFT represents more than 20,000 members in 54 local unions. Its members include public education employees, higher education faculty and support staff, and public employees. Most of its membership is in the larger cities, such as Cincinnati, Cleveland and Toledo.

== Founding ==
In 1933, the officers of the American Federation of Teachers met in Springfield, Ohio. The AFT was debating structural changes to the national organization, and had decided to experiment with state federations as legislative, lobbying, political and organizing umbrella bodies for the union's growing number of local affiliates. Ohio was selected to be the first test case.

On May 26, 1934, the Ohio State Federation of Teachers (as the OFT was originally known) met in convention was in Springfield. Irvin Kuenzli, president of the Springfield Federation of Teachers, was elected the organization's first president. (Kuenzli would become the AFT's secretary-treasurer from 1936 to 1953.) The state federation's office was in Toledo.

Whether the OFT was the first "official" state federation within the AFT is a matter of debate. In 1936, the OFT established a dues system for local affiliates, becoming the first self-funding, staffed state federation in the AFT. However, the OFT was not formally chartered by AFT until February 26, 1938—after charters were issued in Wisconsin, Minnesota and Pennsylvania. But the unofficial establishment date, along with the establishment of a dues structure, has led the OFT to claim to be the first "active" state federation in the AFT.

With Kuenzli's departure in 1936, E. Glenn Baxter of the Elyria Federation of Teachers became OFT president, and the first president elected under the new charter. Michael Eck of the Cleveland Teachers Union was the first executive secretary (he also served as an AFT vice president).

At this time, the OFT had 5,000 members in 13 locals. Since the AFT only had 25,000 members nationally, one in five AFT members belonged to OFT.

The OFT focused on legislative activity (primarily increased funding for public schools) and organizing new locals in its first three decades.

== Growth ==
Between 1936 and 1939, the OFT added 1,000 members in 13 new locals. Six locals were formed to represent educators in federally funded Works Progress Administration (WPA) vocational educational training programs. When Congress ended funding for the WPA in 1943, these locals disbanded.

Beginning in 1939 and lasting throughout the 1940s, the OFT struggled with whether to affiliate with the Ohio Education Association (OEA), the state affiliate of the National Education Association (NEA). At the time, the AFT did not require that its local unions affiliate only with the AFT. Nor did the AFT require that its locals affiliate with the OFT or state and local American Federation of Labor bodies. Several AFT locals in Ohio remained affiliated with both the AFT and NEA, and formed an "AFT caucus" within the OEA. Over time, however, the OEA's conservative stands on tenure, increased funding for public schools, and collective bargaining led AFT affiliates in Ohio to drop their dual affiliation.

In 1965, OFT hired its first organizer and moved its offices to Columbus.

In 1966, OFT hired the first staff to provide services (such as contract negotiations, research, grievance processing, etc.) to local affiliates.

The energy and militancy engendered in the teacher union movement in the United States by the formation of the United Federation of Teachers spread quickly to Ohio. Between 1965 and 1967, the OFT chartered 21 new local unions. But since no state, county, local or school district law or regulation permitted collective bargaining, locals struggled for survival; many disbanded after only a short time.

In 1968, AFT convention delegates passed an amendment to the union's national constitution requiring locals to affiliate with their respective state federations. In 1969, the AFT convention passed an amendment to require local unions to affiliate with their respective state and local AFL–CIO bodies.

== Achievement of collective bargaining ==
In 1978, OFT president Ron Marec was elected one of the vice presidents of the Ohio AFL–CIO. He was the first AFT member chosen to serve on the state AFL–CIO's executive board.

In 1976, the Cincinnati Federation of Teachers won passage of a collective bargaining law for teachers and paraprofessionals in the Cincinnati public schools. The success of this endeavor led the OFT to begin a campaign for collective bargaining for all public employees.

In 1979, the OFT made the office of the president a full-time position.

In the 1980s, as part of a national policy adopted by the AFT, the OFT began raiding established teacher locals to build its membership. The OFT targeted OEA and independent education unions which had achieved collective bargaining (either by reaching a contract or through adoption of local law or ordinance). It forced a new collective bargaining election or created an insurgency which would seize control of the union's governing body and push through an affiliation change.

The results were dramatic. In 1978, only six of the OFT's 41 local affiliates had a collective bargaining agreement. But by 1988—despite the loss of several affiliates to the OEA or through disbanding—30 of the OFT's affiliates had such a relationship (and 12 of those were raided locals).

The increased flow of dues stabilized the OFT financially and organizationally, permitting it to grow. The OFT began organizing school paraprofessionals, higher education faculty and support personnel, and public employees in an effort to achieve greater financial stability.

OFT was instrumental in winning passage of Ohio's Public Employee Collective Bargaining Act in 1984. An explosion of education organizing occurred statewide. Although OEA and OFT often competed in these organizing elections, raiding between the two unions largely ceased (and was prohibited by an AFT-NEA "no-raid" agreement in 1998).

In 2000, Marec retired as OFT president. Tom Mooney, president of the Cincinnati Federation of Teachers, was elected as his replacement.

On December 3, 2006, Mooney died of a heart attack at his home in Columbus. Sue Taylor, president of the Cincinnati Federation of Teachers, was elected president on March 9, 2007, to fill out his term.

OFT has been involved in statewide politics; for example, it endorsed the Citizens Not Politicians campaign for the 2024 Issue 1 ballot initiative against gerrymandering.
