= American Federation of Teachers =

Labor union for education workers

- Abbreviation: AFT
- Predecessor: American Federation of Teachers and Students
- Founded: April 15, 1916
- Headquarters: Washington, D.C., US
- Location: United States
- Members: 1.7 million
- President: Randi Weingarten
- Affiliations: AFL-CIO; Education International; Public Services International
- Website: aft.org

The American Federation of Teachers (AFT) is the second-largest teachers labor union in America (the largest being the National Education Association). The union was founded in Chicago. John Dewey and Margaret Haley were founders.

About 60 percent of AFT's membership works directly in education, with the remainder of the union's members composed of paraprofessionals and school-related personnel; local, state and federal employees; higher education faculty and staff, and nurses and other healthcare professionals. The AFT has, since its founding, affiliated with trade union federations: until 1955 the American Federation of Labor, and now the AFL-CIO.

== History ==
Total membership (US records; ×1000)
View source data.
Finances (US records; ×$1000)
View source data.

AFT was founded in Chicago, Illinois, on April 15, 1916. Charles Stillman was the first president and Margaret Haley was the national organizer. On May 9, 1916, the American Federation of Labor chartered the AFT. By 1919, AFT had 100 local affiliates and a membership of approximately 11,000 teachers, which amounted to 1.5 percent of the nation's teaching force. In its early days, AFT distinguished itself from the National Education Association (NEA) by its exclusion of school administrators from membership. Facing opposition from politicians and boards of education, membership in AFT declined to 7,000 by 1930. During this period, the organization had little impact on local or national education policy.

AFT membership climbed during the Great Depression, reaching 33,000 by 1939. During the 1930s, AFT, whose members had historically been primary school teachers, saw influential college professors join the union. Also during the 1930s, the Communist Party gained influence within the AFT. In 1941, under pressure from the AFL, the union ejected three local unions in New York City and Philadelphia (including its prominent early member, the New York City Teachers Union, AFT Local 5) for being communist-dominated. The charter revocations represented nearly a third of the union's national membership.

The 1940s were marked by a series of teacher strikes, including 57 strikes that occurred from 1946 through 1949. By 1947, AFT had a membership of 42,000. The 1960s and 1970s also saw numerous teacher strikes, including 1,000 strikes involving more than 823,000 teachers between 1960 and 1974.

AFT membership was 59,000 in 1960, 200,000 in 1970, and 550,000 in 1980. In 2017, membership was around 1.6 million, and the union had due income of $35 million.

Since 1977, AFT has published a quarterly magazine for teachers covering various issues about children and education called American Educator. In 1998, the membership of the NEA rejected a proposed merger with AFT. The AFT's membership is half that of the NEA.

== Presidents of the AFT ==
Albert Shanker

In 1974, Albert Shanker was elected president of AFT. He served in this role until his death on February 22, 1997. For 27 years, Shanker wrote a weekly column entitled "Where We Stand" that ran as an advertisement in The New York Times. Shanker was an early advocate of charter schools. He also called for a national competency test for teachers, merit pay for teachers, and more rigorous requirements for high school graduation. During his tenure as AFT president, Shanker was jailed twice for leading illegal strikes.

Sandra Feldman

Sandra Feldman served as AFT's president from 1997 to 2004. Feldman helped craft the No Child Left Behind Act.

Edward J. McElroy

Edward J. McElroy, the AFT's secretary-treasurer since 1992, was elected president of the AFT in 2004, replacing Feldman. On February 12, 2008, McElroy announced he would retire at the union's regularly scheduled biennial convention in July. On July 14, 2008, Randi Weingarten was elected to succeed him.

Randi Weingarten

On July 14, 2008, Randi Weingarten, then the president of the United Federation of Teachers, was elected to succeed McElroy as AFT president. In September 2008, she announced the launch of the AFT Innovation Fund, a union-led, private foundation-supported effort to provide grants to AFT unions to develop and implement innovations in education. In 2014, Weingarten announced that AFT was ending a five-year funding relationship between the Bill & Melinda Gates Foundation and the AFT Innovation Fund.

== Political activities ==
Since 1980, AFT and the NEA have contributed nearly $57.4 million to federal campaigns, an amount that is about 30 percent higher than any single corporation or other union. About 95 percent of political donations from teachers' unions have gone to Democrats.

In 2008, AFT provided a campaign contribution of $1,784,808.59 to Hillary Clinton and $1,997,375.00 to Barack Obama.

In July 2015, AFT endorsed Democrat Hillary Clinton in the 2016 presidential race. Clinton and AFT president Randi Weingarten are longtime friends. AFT's official endorsement of Clinton caused controversy among some AFT members who felt that the endorsement came too soon and did not reflect the wishes of rank-and-file AFT members, some of whom supported Bernie Sanders.

Members' dues underwrite much of AFT's political activities. In 2015, four California teachers sued AFT and its California unit, the California Federation of Teachers, over the use of member dues for political activities. The plaintiffs argued that unions were violating their constitutional right to free speech by forcing them to either support union-favored causes and candidates or lose access to important job benefits such as disability and life insurance.

In 2018, the landmark Supreme Court ruling in Janus v. AFSCME resolved this matter, concluding that public-sector union fees violate the First Amendment, compelling nonmembers to "subsidize private speech on matters of substantial public concern". Unions will, subsequently, need to gain the affirmative consent of individual teachers before enrolling them in the union.

== Activities ==
=== Race relations ===
The AFT was one of the first trade unions to allow African Americans and minorities to become full members of their trade union. In 1918, the AFT called for equal pay for African-American teachers, the election of African Americans to local school boards and compulsory school attendance for African-American children. In 1919, the AFT called for equal educational opportunities for African-American children, and in 1928 called for the social, political, economic, and cultural contributions of African Americans to be taught in the public schools.

In 1951, the union stopped chartering segregated locals. It filed an amicus brief in the 1954 US Supreme Court desegregation case Brown v. Board of Education. In 1957, the AFT expelled all locals that refused to desegregate. This resulted in the loss of over 7,000 members. In 1963, the AFT actively supported the March on Washington for Jobs and Freedom.

=== Collective bargaining ===
By the late 1940s, AFT was slowly moving toward collective bargaining as an official policy. By the end of the 1970s, collective bargaining agreements covered 72 percent of public school teachers.

=== Active shooter drills ===
In 2020, the union along with the National Education Association issued a report expressing opposition to active shooter drills being held in schools, calling on the drills to be revised or eliminated.

=== Share My Lesson ===
In 2012, AFT partnered with Britain's TES Connect to create a curriculum sharing website called Share My Lesson. The AFT and TES invested $10 million to develop the site.

== Criticism ==
In 2010, four American film documentaries, most notably Waiting for Superman, portrayed the AFT as hurting children by opposing charter schools and protecting incompetent teachers.

== Leadership ==
=== Presidents ===
1916: Charles Stillman
1923: Florence Rood
1925: Mary C. Barker
1931: Henry R. Linville
1934: Raymond F. Lowry
1936: Jerome C. Davis
1939: George S. Counts
1942: John M. Fewkes
1943: Joseph F. Landis
1947: John M. Eklund
1952: Carl J. Megel
1964: Charles Cogen
1968: David Selden
1974: Albert Shanker
1997: Sandra Feldman
2004–2008: Edward J. McElroy
2008–present: Randi Weingarten

=== Secretary-Treasurers ===
1916: F. G. Stecker
1926: Florence Curtis Hanson
1935: George Davis
1936: Irvin R. Kuenzli
1953: Post vacant
1963: Robert Porter
1992: Edward J. McElroy
2004: Nat LaCour
2008: Antonia Cortese
2011: Lorretta Johnson
2020: Fedrick C. Ingram

== Notable AFT members ==
- J. Quinn Brisben, Socialist Party USA candidate for President of the United States in the 1992 US presidential election
- Ralph Bunche, former United Nations Under-Secretary-General and Nobel Peace Prize winner
- Tony Danza, film and television actor
- Paul Douglas, US Senator from Illinois
- John Dewey, educator
- Albert Einstein, scientist
- Michael Harrington, political activist
- Hubert Humphrey, US vice-president and US Senator from Minnesota
- Mike Mansfield, former United States Senate Majority Leader and US Ambassador to Japan
- Frank McCourt, Pulitzer Prize-winning author
- Robert Oppenheimer, scientist
- Donna Shalala, former US Representative from Florida and former United States Secretary of Health and Human Services
- Elie Wiesel, Nobel Peace Prize winner
- Kshama Sawant, socialist activist and member of the Seattle City Council

== Notable AFT locals and federations ==
=== Current ===
- Chicago Teachers Union
- Cincinnati Federation of Teachers
- Education Minnesota
- Florida Education Association
- Health Professionals and Allied Employees
- Montana Federation of Public Employees
- New York State United Teachers
- Ohio Federation of Teachers
- Professional Staff Congress (City University of New York)
- Public Employees Federation (New York state)
- Rhode Island Federation of Teachers and Health Professionals
- Temple University Graduate Students Association
- United Federation of Teachers (New York City)
- United Teachers Los Angeles
- United Teachers of New Orleans
- University Health Professionals (Connecticut state)
- Washington State Nurses Association

=== Former ===
- Chicago Teachers Federation

== See also ==
- 1990 West Virginia teachers' strike
- Coalition of Graduate Employee Unions
- Teachers Union
- Teachers Guild

== Archives ==
- American Federation of Teachers Local 200 Photograph Collection. approximately 1964-1975. 69 photographic prints (1 box); various sizes, 12 negatives.
- AFT Antecedents to Historical Reform, a digital library project to host primary resources from the AFT historical collections in the Walter P. Reuther Library that document various education reform initiatives that union and school boards have collaborated on from 1983 to present.
