= Federal Coal Commission =

- Federal Coal Commission in October 1922

Agency overview
- Formed: September 1922
- Jurisdiction: Federal government of the United States
- Headquarters: Washington, DC
- Agency executive: Thomas R. Marshall

The Federal Coal Commission was an agency of the Federal government of the United States of America, enacted by the U.S. Congress in September 1922. It was headed by former U.S. Vice President Thomas R. Marshall.

== History ==
=== Background ===
On April 1, 1922, the United Mine Workers (UMW) began a nationwide coal strike. By mid-May 1922, the United States faced a "serious coal shortage." Only mines without unions remained open; prices rose, as did hoarding.

On June 8, 1922, Warren G. Harding announced that voluntary pricing was relieving the situation. UMW president John L. Lewis complained for miners about cheating by non-union operators; operators and industry (e.g., the National Coal Association, National Retail Coal Merchants Association) complained about prices. On June 21–22 the Herrin massacre occurred in Herrin, Illinois: three union miners were shot and killed on June 21 and twenty strikebreakers and mine guards were killed next day. On July 1, Harding called for labor negotiations to start, led by U.S. Secretary of Labor James J. Davis and U.S. Secretary of Commerce (and future U.S. president) Herbert Hoover. On July 18, the U.S. Geological Survey issued a report stating that non-union mining operations could not maintain sufficient supply of coal nationally. Hoover then formulated a plan to create regional committees, supported by railroad and ICC executives to keep coal supplied to critical users: his plan became the Coal Distribution Committee, with representatives from the departments of Commerce, Interior, and Justice, plus the ICC, and headed by Henry C. Spencer. By August, with no resolution, miners and operators were ready to talk.

In August nearly a fifth of soft coal miners and operators met in Cleveland, Ohio. They agreed to extend their pre-strike contract on soft coal to April 1, 1923. They pressured the anthracite coal industry to extend their contract to August 31, 1923. They also endorsed a presidential commission. On August 22, 1922 President Harding announced his intention to form a Federal coal commission, as well as his opposition to allow miners and mine operators become commission members.

=== Formation ===
- On August 19, Harding asked Congress for a bill to create a coal commission.
- In September 1922, the U.S. Congress passed a bill that created the Federal Coal Commission, as well as a Federal Coal Distributor. A House bill did not provide for members from among miners (labor), as congressional representatives such as Meyer London noted. A Senate bill excluded all people with coal interests, which cleared both houses.
- In October 1922, President Harding appointed the commission's members, as well as F. R. Wadleigh as Distributor. At the same time, he disbanded a similar, private committee he had formed previously, funded by the Cabot Foundation.

=== Activities ===
The commission commenced an industry report in late 1922. The commission engaged Dr. Jerome Davis, then a Dartmouth College professor, to investigate labor situation in West Virginia coal mines; man of their findings appeared in their report.

On February 2, 1923, Chicago-based Federal Judge Samuel Alschuler quit the commission.

On July 5, 1923, the Commission completed its report on anthracite coal. The "verbose and inconclusive" report did not avert an anthracite coal strike by September 8, 1923. On September 17, 1923, Gifford Pinchot, governor of Pennsylvania, brokered a settlement, which embarrassed Secretary Hoover (as they were political rivals).

(Harding died in office on August 2, 1923; Calvin Coolidge succeeded.)

Despite the intervention of the Federal Coal Commission, "in the ensuring years, the position of the coal miner continued to deteriorate, as did the industry."

== Works ==
- "What Lies Before the New Federal Coal Commission" (1922).

== People ==
=== Commission heads ===
- Thomas R. Marshall (1922–1923)

=== Members ===
- Edward Thomas Devine

== See also ==
- U.S. Anthracite Coal Strike Commission of 1902
- U.S. Anthracite Coal Commission of 1920, AKA U.S. Coal Commission of 1920
- Thomas R. Marshall
- John L. Lewis
- 1922 UMW General coal strike
  - Herrin massacre
- United Mine Workers

== External sources ==
- Howard, Walter T. (2005). Forgotten Radicals: Communists in the Pennsylvania Anthracite, 1919-1950. University Press of America. p. 20. ISBN 9780761830900.
- "Create Federal Coal Commission". Brick and Clay Record. 1922: 468–469.
- "Labor Costs". Amalgamated Sheet Metal Workers' Journal. 1922: 36.
