= What is Aleppo? =

2016 remark by Gary Johnson

"What is Aleppo?" is a remark made by Gary Johnson, the Libertarian Party's nominee in the 2016 United States presidential election, on September 8, 2016, during a live television interview on MSNBC's Morning Joe. When panelist Mike Barnicle asked Johnson what he would do about Aleppo – the Syrian city that had become the focal point of the country's civil war and the resulting refugee crisis – Johnson replied, "And what is Aleppo?" The remark is regarded as having significantly damaged or ended Johnson's prospects of reaching the 15 percent polling threshold required to qualify for the presidential debates.

== Background ==
=== 2016 Libertarian presidential campaign ===
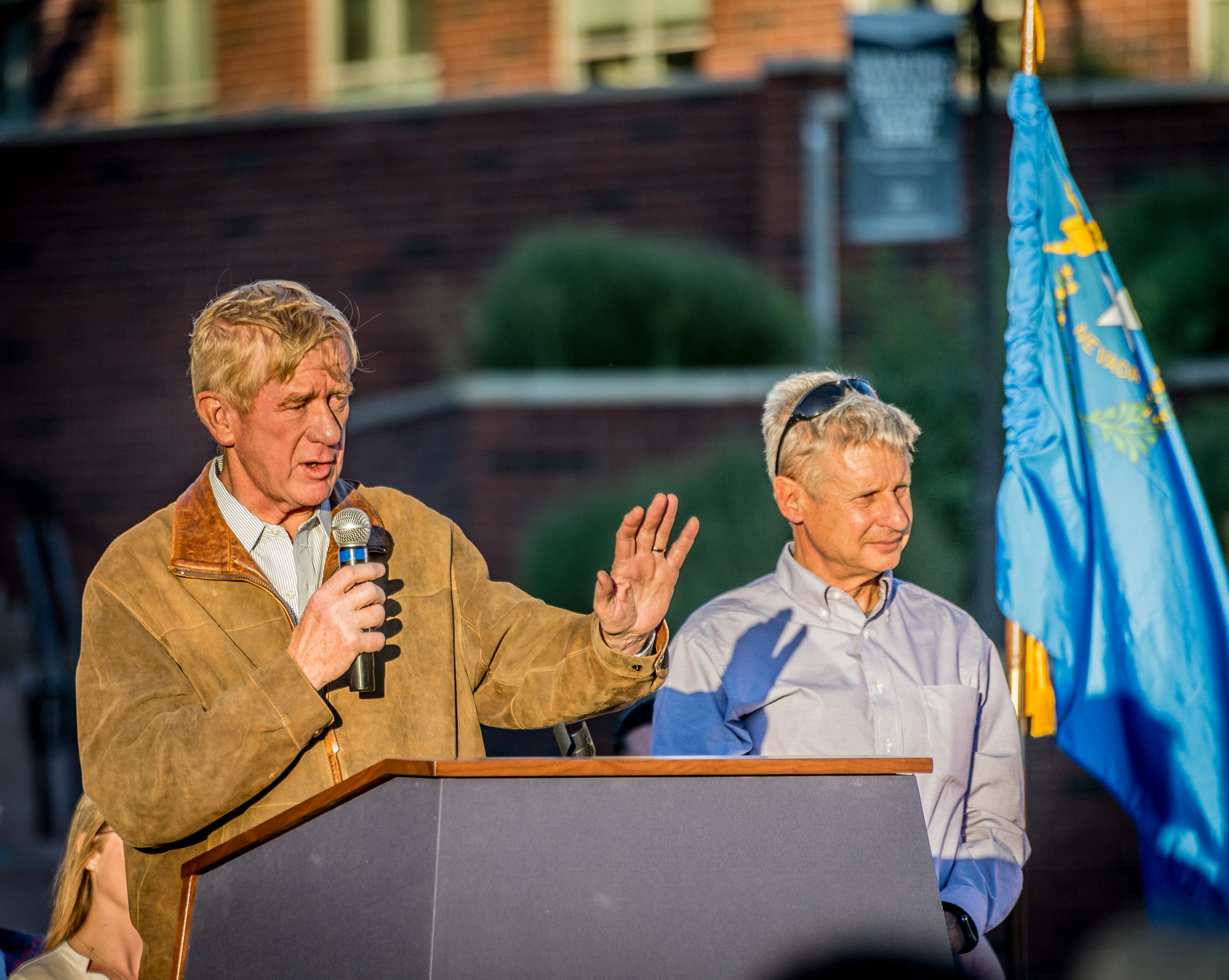
Weld and Johnson at a Nevada rally in August 2016

Gary Johnson, the former two-term governor of New Mexico, ran for president on the Libertarian ticket in both 2012 and 2016. In 2012, he received approximately one percent of the popular vote. In 2016, with former Massachusetts governor Bill Weld as his running mate, Johnson attracted significantly higher polling numbers amid widespread dissatisfaction with both major party nominees, Hillary Clinton and Donald Trump.

By early September 2016, Johnson was averaging approximately ten percent in national polls, lower than the fifteen percent threshold set by the Commission on Presidential Debates, but higher than any third party candidate had polled at a comparable stage of a presidential race in decades. Johnson needed to reach fifteen percent in an average of five national polls to qualify for the presidential debates, the first of which was scheduled for September 26. The interview on Morning Joe on September 8 was part of a media tour Johnson was conducting specifically aimed at raising his polling numbers.

=== Aleppo and the Syrian civil war ===
By September 2016, Aleppo was among the most widely covered international news stories. The city, Syria's largest before the civil war, had been divided since 2012 into government-held and opposition-held sectors, and was under sustained siege by forces loyal to Bashar al-Assad.

== Interview ==
The exchange took place during the September 8, 2016, broadcast of Morning Joe, an MSNBC morning programme. Panelist Mike Barnicle asked Johnson: "What would you do, if you were elected, about Aleppo?" Johnson responded, "and what is Aleppo?" When Barnicle replied "You're kidding... Aleppo is in Syria – it's the epicenter of the refugee crisis," Johnson responded by saying that "the only way that we deal with Syria is to join hands with Russia to diplomatically bring that at an end."

Morning Joe co-host Joe Scarborough concluded the show by saying Johnson had "disqualified himself", with Barnicle adding that Johnson had expressed "an appalling lack of knowledge". Following the segment, Bloomberg's Mark Halperin told Johnson that the interview would be considered a "big flap", with Johnson admitting that he was "incredibly frustrated."

== Response ==
Johnson's "what is Aleppo?" question drew widespread attention, much of it negative, including a trending "#WhatIsAleppo" hashtag on Twitter. CNN's Christiane Amanpour said on air: "That is the kind of thing that gives the rest of the world great pause." The Christian Science Monitor noted that the gaffe, while embarrassing, might not necessarily have a decisive impact on Johnson's campaign, citing political scientists who observed that foreign policy typically plays a limited role in the outcome of American presidential elections. Others were less equivocal; the libertarian magazine Reason described the moment as "a serious blunder" that "gives ammunition to those who think Libertarians are inherently unserious" on foreign policy.

Laurence Tribe, a Harvard Law School constitutional law professor, wrote after the interview that Johnson's remark "end[ed]" his campaign. At a press conference, Hillary Clinton laughed at Johnson's remark, adding that "you can look at a map and find Aleppo".

On September 13, 2016, a group of Aleppo-based doctors and nurses led by Zaher Sahloul published a response to Johnson's remarks in Time magazine. While the group was critical of "Johnson's ignorance of [the] city", they focused condemnation on Barack Obama and other world leaders "who knew about what was going in Aleppo [but] stood idle while ... children [were] bombed, starved and gassed."

=== Johnson's campaign ===
Later that day, Johnson said in a statement that he had "blanked" and that he did "understand the dynamics of the Syrian conflict – I talk about them every day," but that he immediately thought that Barnicle's reference to "Aleppo" was in relation to "an acronym, not the Syrian conflict." Johnson went on to say: "Can I name every city in Syria? No. Should I have identified Aleppo? Yes. Do I understand its significance? Yes."

In a subsequent appearance on ABC's The View, Johnson addressed the incident directly, saying: "For those that believe this is a disqualifier, so be it." A spokesperson for the Johnson campaign told Politico that the remark was "a hiccup". Johnson told Fox News: "If it is kissing my chances goodbye, so be it."

== Aftermath ==
During a CNBC town hall television broadcast on September 28, Johnson was asked by moderator Chris Matthews, "Who's your favorite foreign leader?" Johnson at first stated "the former president of Mexico" but could not identify him by name. Johnson then stated: "I guess I'm having an Aleppo moment" and "I'm having a brain freeze."

The remark is viewed as having harmed or ended Johnson's prospects of reaching the 15 percent polling threshold required to qualify for the presidential debates. A CNN/ORC poll conducted at the time of the presidential debates found that a third of likely voters said they did not know who he was. In the November 2016 general election, Johnson received over 3 percent of the popular vote. The result was the highest vote share for the Libertarian Party in its history to that point, but far short of the threshold that would have granted the party federal matching funds and automatic ballot access in subsequent elections.
