= Zaher Sahloul =

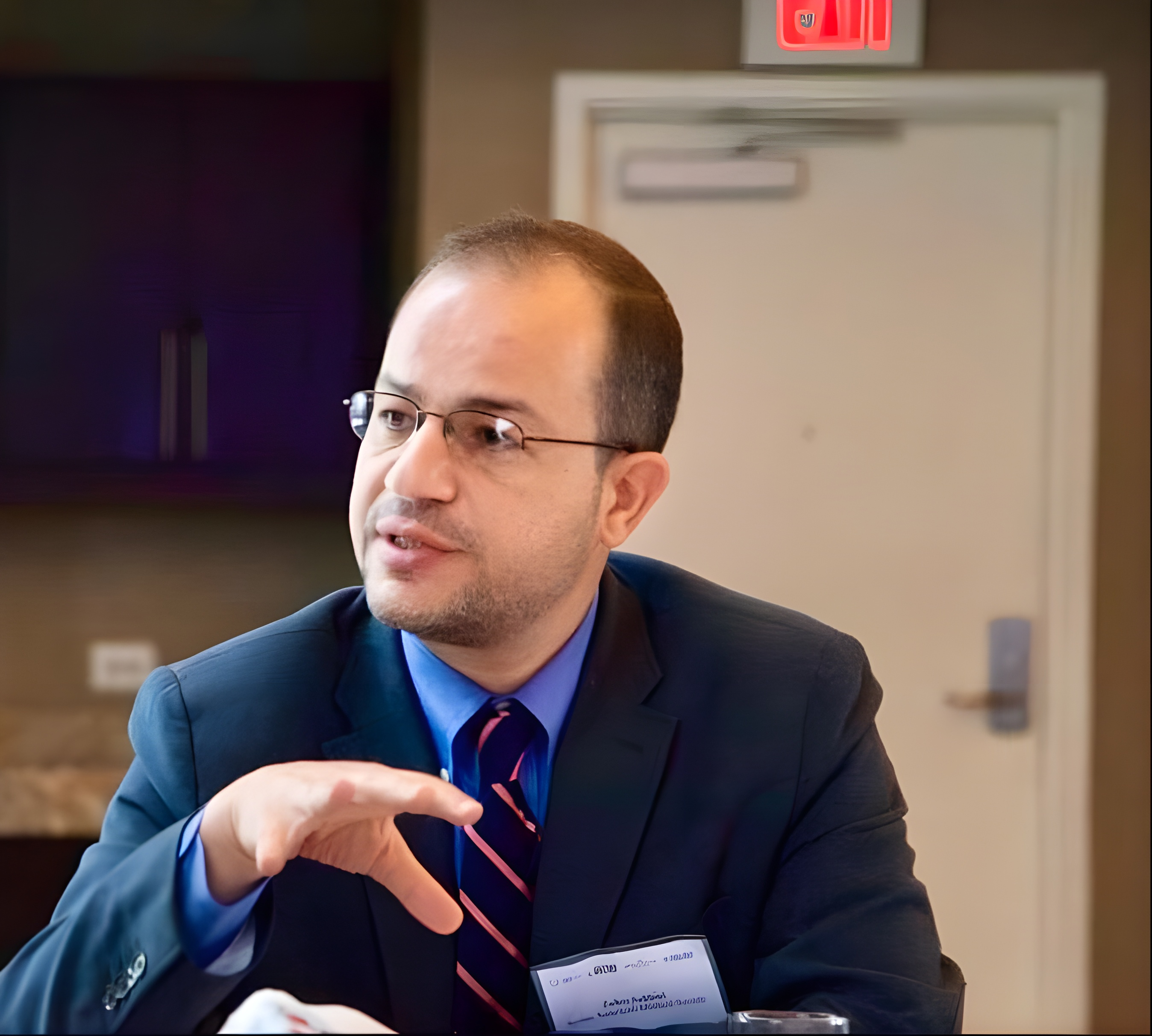
- Born: Syria
- Education: University of Illinois Chicago; Damascus University
- Occupations: Physician; Activist; Humanitarian
- Years active: 2000-Present
- Known for: Humanitarian Activism
- Notable work: Syrian American Medical Society
- Spouse: Suzanne Akhras

Zaher Sahloul is a Syrian-American physician, activist, and humanitarian known for his efforts to improve access to healthcare and protect medical neutrality in conflict zones and low-income communities around the world, particularly in Syria, Ukraine, and Gaza.

Sahloul co-founded and served as the president of MedGlobal in 2017, and the president of the Syrian American Medical Society from 2011-2015.

== Early life and education ==
Sahloul was born in Algeria to Syrian elementary school teachers and spent his early years in Homs, Syria. He graduated summa cum laude and earned his M.D. from Damascus University in 1988. In 1989, he migrated to the United States, where he completed his training in Internal Medicine from 1990 to 1993, and a fellowship in Pulmonary, Critical Care, and sleep medicine at the University of Illinois at Chicago from 1993-1996.

== Career ==
Sahloul began his career as a critical care specialist at Advocate Christ Medical Center and Saint Anthony’s hospital and later served as an Associate Professor in Clinical Medicine at the University of Illinois in Chicago.

In 1998, Sahloul co-founded the Syrian American Medical Society (SAMS) and served as its senior advisor until 2016. He also held the position of president at SAMS from 2011 to 2015.

Sahloul is also the founder and President of Syria Faith Initiative, which is a non-sectarian, apolitical coalition of interfaith leaders working for improvement of Syrian society. He co-founded SAMS Global Response to address the refugee crisis in Europe, as well as the American Relief Coalition for Syria (ARCS), a coalition of 14 humanitarian organizations.

Sahloul has also been a board member of the Illinois Coalition for Immigrant and Refugee Rights, Heartland Alliance, American Business Immigration Coalition, and chaired the Council of Islamic Organization of Greater Chicago from 2008-2012. He was appointed as a member of Illinois board of health by Governor Pat Quinn from 2009 to 2016. He is a member of the advisory boards of the Syrian Community Network (SCN), and the Center for Public Health and Human Rights and Johns Hopkins University Bloomberg School of Public Health. From 2010 to 2014 he was a board member of American Islamic College.

In 2017, Sahloul co-founded MedGlobal, a humanitarian charitable non-governmental organization that provides emergency response and health programs vulnerable communities around the world. In 2020, he co-founded the American Coalition for Ukraine to support the humanitarian response to the Russian war in Ukraine. Sahloul is also an active supporter of human rights and actively talks and writes about such issues on various news platforms.

In April 2024, Sahloul was among a small group of Muslim-American leaders who met with President Joe Biden and Vice President Kamala Harris at the White House to discuss the humanitarian crisis in Gaza.

== Awards and recognition ==
Sahloul was the receiver of 2018 Top Muslim Achiever award from The Council of Islamic Organizations of Greater Chicago (CIOGC). He was awarded the Gandhi Award for Peace for his humanitarian work in 2020. He has also received other awards including Dr. Robert Kirschner’s Award for Global Activism by Heartland Alliance Kovler Center 2017 and annual humanitarian award by UNICEF Chicago 2017.

In June 2024, Sahloul was chosen by US Senator Dick Durbin as the senator’s guest for President Biden’s State of the Union address to Congress, due to his long record of medical aid work and particular focus on alleviating suffering in Gaza.

== Personal life ==
Sahloul is married to Suzanne Akhras and the couple has three children.
