= General Hester =

General Hester may refer to:

- Hugh B. Hester (1895–1983), U.S. Army brigadier general
- John H. Hester (1886–1976), U.S. Army major general
- Paul V. Hester (born 1947), U.S. Air Force four-star general

== See also ==
- Leopold Philip de Heister (1716−1777), Hessian lieutenant general
