= Mercers Saltworks, West Virginia =

- Former settlement
- Location within West Virginia
- Coordinates: 37°28′57″N 80°52′42″W
- Country: United States
- State: West Virginia
- County: Summers
- Elevation: 1,467 ft (447 m)
- GNIS feature ID: 1556937

Mercers Saltworks is a former settlement in Summers County, West Virginia, United States. Mercers Saltworks was located on the New River, east of Lick Creek and appeared on maps as late as 1932.
