= Israel vs Israel =

- Directed by: Terje Carlsson
- Produced by: Terje Carlsson; SVT Lars Säfström
- Starring: Yehuda Shaul; Jonathan Pollack; Ronny Perlmann; Arik Ascherman
- Cinematography: Terje Carlsson
- Edited by: Josef Nyberg
- Distributed by: Java Films
- Release date: September 26, 2010
- Running time: 58 minutes
- Countries: Sweden; Palestine; Israel
- Languages: English; Arabic; Hebrew

Israel vs Israel is a 2010 documentary on the Israeli–Palestinian conflict by Swedish freelance journalist and filmmaker Terje Carlsson about Israeli peace activists.

The film portrays four Israelis struggling against the military occupation of the Palestinian territories: Jonathan Pollak from Anarchists Against the Wall, Yehuda Shaul from Breaking the Silence, Ronny Perlmann from Machsom Watch and Arik Ascherman from Rabbis for Human Rights.

The film won the Best International Documentary award at the 2011 Turkish Radio and Television Corporation documentary film festival as well an award from the Doha Centre for Media Freedom at the 2011 Al Jazeera Film Festival, and has been screened at festivals in Stockholm, Montreal, Tromsø, and Trondheim.
