= Einat Ramon =

- עינת רמון
- Born: Einat Ramon; 1959 (age 66–67); Jerusalem, Israel
- Occupations: Teacher, lecturer
- Known for: First Israeli-born woman rabbi who had left the rabbinate and became Orthodox.

Einat Ramon (Hebrew: עינת רמון; born 1959) was the first Israeli-born woman to be ordained as a rabbi. She was also the first woman and the first sabra to head a Conservative rabbinical school, specifically the Schechter Rabbinical Seminary in Jerusalem, where she was dean from 2005 to 2009. Since 2011 she no longer identifies as a rabbi, heads the Marpeh training program for spiritual caregivers in Jerusalem, and teaches modern Jewish thought and Jewish feminism at the Schechter Institute.

== Biography ==
Ramon was ordained in 1989 at the Jewish Theological Seminary in New York. Following that, she acted as interim rabbi at Berkeley Hillel and earned a doctorate in religious studies from Stanford University. She worked as the “circuit” rabbi for Congregation Har-Shalom in Missoula, Montana before returning to Israel in 1994.

Ramon served as dean of the Schechter Rabbinical Seminary in Jerusalem from 2005 to 2009. During that time she opposed the ordination of homosexual rabbis at Schechter and same sex marriage in the Conservative Movement, which prompted a falling-out with the North American Masorti seminaries that had just begun ordaining homosexual rabbis.

She is the author of the book A New Life: Religion, Motherhood and Supreme Love in the Works of Aharon David Gordon, and has contributed to the book New Jewish Feminism: Probing the Past, Forging the Future. She has also published articles on modern Jewish thought, Jewish feminism and Zionist intellectual history.

In 2011 she left the Conservative Movement and the rabbinate due to ideological disputes. She no longer considers herself a rabbi. Her affiliation is that of a modern Orthodox Jew.

Since 2006, Dr. Ramon has been active in the clinical pastoral care movement in Israel. She has been involved in setting up the first clinical pastoral education unit in Israel, participating in the network and later the association of spiritual caregivers in Israel as the writer the ethical code for Israeli spiritual caregivers and the professional standards for training Israeli chaplains. In 2011 she had set up the only Israeli academic program specializing in Jewish spiritual care at the Schechter Institute.

== Personal ==
Ramon is married to Rabbi Arik Ascherman, an American-born Reform rabbi and human rights activist

== See also ==
- Timeline of women rabbis
