= Jerome Davis (sociologist) =

American activist, labor organizer, and sociologist

- Born: Jerome Dwight Davis; December 2, 1891; Kyoto, Japan
- Died: November 19, 1979 (aged 87); Olney, Maryland, U.S.
- Education: Union Theological Seminary; Columbia University; Oberlin College
- Occupations: international activist for peace and social reform, labor organizer, sociologist
- Years active: 1913–1975
- Employer(s): YMCA, Dartmouth, Yale, AFT, Promoting Enduring Peace
- Known for: Advocacy for global peace, cooperation, labor and prisoner rights
- Notable work: Behind Soviet Power (1946)

Jerome Dwight Davis (December 2, 1891 – October 19, 1979), was an American activist for international peace and social reform, a labor organizer, and a sociologist who founded the organization Promoting Enduring Peace. Early in his life, he campaigned to reduce the workweek and as an advocate of organized labor.

== Background ==
Davis was born in Kyoto, Japan on December 2, 1891, to American missionaries Jerome Dean Davis and Frances Hooper. His father helped found Doshisha University and then taught there. Davis spent his early childhood in Japan.

In 1904, Davis came to the US with his parents to get an American education. He attended Newton High School in Newton, Massachusetts and Oberlin Academy. In 1913, he graduated from Oberlin College, where he had served as president of the local Young Men's Christian Association (YMCA). He spent a year in community service at the Minneapolis Civic and Commerce Association, through which he helped obtain a half holiday for workers in some larger local factories.

== Career ==
In 1914, Davis started a doctorate simultaneously at the Union Theological Seminary and Columbia University. He financed his studies through work. He performed social work, worked as assistant at Broadway Tabernacle, and lectured for the City of New York.

During the summer of 1915, he worked as a private secretary to Sir Wilfred Grenfell in Labrador, Canada, and helped him in a wide array of services. Grenfell arrested felons and also extracted teeth. In the fall of 1915, Davis took leave from his studies to travel to Europe and work with prisoners of war (POWs) during the Great War. Their plight became a lifelong interest.

=== YMCA (Russia) ===
Davis spent 1916–1918 in Russia. He was sent to Russia by the YMCA to work with German POWs. He also set up YMCA centers for Russian soldiers. Upon American entry into World War I in 1917, he was appointed as head of all YMCA work in Russia. For the US Government, he oversaw distribution of more than a million copies of President Wilson's Fourteen Points message to German soldiers.

He opposed US military intervention in Russia during its civil war in favor of working with the new Soviet Union. During the 1920s, Davis returned to Russia several times and continued to advocate for Soviet cooperation. His chart of the construction of the Soviet government was published in Workers' Dreadnought. By 1920, however, he had returned to the States, and finished his studies at the Union Theological Seminary. In 1922 he obtained a doctorate in sociology from Columbia University.

=== Academia ===
From 1921 to 1924, Davis worked as an associate professor of sociology at Dartmouth College. There, he also advocated for organized labor. He investigated and published findings on a strike in Manchester, New Hampshire. The Federal Coal Commission asked him to investigate operations of West Virginia coal mines. He also served as chairman of the Social Service Commission of the Congregational Church.

In 1924, he founded the Jerome Davis Research fund to support students at Oberlin who "worked with labor" to facilitate "mutual understanding and cooperation in the field of industry."

From 1924 to 1936, Davis was appointed a Gilbert L. Stark professor of "practical philanthropy" at the Yale Divinity School. He helped organize labor forums for the New Haven Trades Council. He developed labor ideals adopted by the Congregational and Christian Churches of America. He chaired the Social Service Commission of Protestant churches in Connecticut. From 1924 to 1936, he also chaired the Legislative Commission on Jails of the State of Connecticut for twelve years. He used a $50,000 Federal grant to review Connecticut prisoner records, with findings published in 1932. In 1935, Davis wrote a biographical introduction on William Gayley Simpson for his book Toward The Rising Sun, which is a book that critiques Christianity.

In 1928, Davis was a member of the American Society for Cultural Relations with Russia, part of VOKS (Russian "Vsesoiuznoe Obshchestvo Kul'turnoi Sviazi s zagranitsei" — Всесоюзное общество культурной связи с заграницей, All-Union Society for Cultural Relations with Foreign Countries).

When he did not receive tenure at Yale, the decision was controversial and was widely believed to be a result of his socialism. The National Education Association, the American Federation of Labor, and the American Association of University Professors investigated the case. Yale denied permission to New York Supreme Court Justice Ferdinand Pecora and US Senator Gerald P. Nye to speak on campus for fear of their support for Davis.

=== American Federation of Teachers ===
From 1936 to 1939, Davis served as president of the American Federation of Teachers (AFT). During his second term (1936–1937), Davis joined Lovestoneites and others in trying to lead the AFT out of the AFL and into the Congress of Industrial Organizations (CIO). However, the Communist Party USA, although it supported the CIO as a policy, itself did not want certain AFL unions like the AFT to leave, because the CPUSA might lose influence in the AFL.

In the late 1930s, Davis (along with Denis Nowell Pritt, Upton Sinclair, Bertolt Brecht, Lion Feuchtwanger, and others) defended the Moscow Trials of the Stalin purge era in the Soviet Union from critics. Davis claimed that, as a former Chairman of the Legislative Commission on Jails in the State of Connecticut, he had seen hundreds of criminals confess based on overwhelming evidence against them. He compared that experience to the confessions given by defendants in the Moscow Trials. He did note that "there is a lot of false testimony in a trial of this kind."

For the rest of his life, Davis worked on and off as visiting professor at colleges and universities. During the 1940 presidential elections, Davis served as delegate from Connecticut to the Democratic National Convention.

=== World War II ===
During World War II, he headed YMCA POW efforts in Canada. From 1943 to 1944 Davis worked as a correspondent for the Toronto Star in Moscow. In January 1944, he was part of the delegation of Western correspondents who visited the graves in Katyn forest at the invitation of the Soviets. He believed the Soviet version that the Germans were the perpetrators.

From 1939 to 1945, Davis was involved in a libel lawsuit he filed (see below). In 1949, he led a peace mission to Europe.

=== Promoting Enduring Peace ===
In 1952, Davis founded the organization Promoting Enduring Peace, Inc., in which he remained active through 1974. The group issued reprints of articles in pamphlet form that opposed the militarism of the mid-1940s, and formally formed the organization in 1952. As its first director, Davis organized many trips to the USSR during the Cold War, in an effort to continue communicating with Russian leaders. In 1957, his group met for two hours with Nikita Khrushchev. In 1970, his group met with Alexei Kosygin. In 1973 and 1975, Davis led similar trips for educators to China, which had been controlled by Communists since shortly after World War II.

He proposed creation of the Gandhi Peace Award on March 13, 1959. He presented it to the first recipient, Eleanor Roosevelt, the following year.

== Controversy ==
Davis supported world peace and international cooperation with all nations, which included working with the Communist states of the USSR and China. Most scholars recognize that his support was based on admiration for Communism and its leaders. Scholar Judy Kutulas writes that Davis found Joseph Stalin to be an impressive intellectual and one useful during a revolutionary period, yet she carefully described him as a non-communist who supported the USSR as an "inveterate front supporter."

During the Cold War and anti-Communist fears in the United States, Davis's efforts were considered suspicious and he earned many opponents to his work. In 1961, the Church League of America wrote:

Jerome Davis, who was kicked out of office in the American Federation of Teachers because of his long pro-Soviet, pro-Communist record, has been identified in numerous pages of Government hearings as one of the top Communist Front joiners in the United States. Davis, according to Biddle, had decided that the Fish Committee of 1930 investigating Communism had been "far more dangerous to liberty and freedom than the pitiful handful of Communists in the United States ever has been.

Of all his publications, Behind Soviet Power stirred up the most attention, at least among anti-communists. Ilya Ehrenburg, a "Soviet newspaperman," wrote its foreword. In 1951 the libertarian The Freeman magazine wrote about him:

There is that strong group in the Methodist Church led by Bishop Ward. Many have belonged to every subversive group in the nation. They love Soviet Russia; they apologize for her all the time...
The Methodist Church is the largest of the Protestant denominations. Its Federation for Social Action publishes a Social Questions Bulletin, which goes to every Methodist clergyman.
The Federation has among its members half the bishops of the church. It includes the heads of their largest theological schools, editors of their papers, heads of various important boards, ministers of their largest churches. To date none of them has been heard to object to what their Federation says.
Take Jerome Davis, who apologizes for Russia every day and has backed many organizations which have been named as Communist fronts. His book Behind Soviet Power is one of the most outspoken apologies for Russia yet published. It was sent free of charge to more than 23,000 Methodist clergymen. With it went a letter stating that it was a gift from the Methodist Federation and adding that every clergyman must read it. There are some queer things in that book, as odd as some statements that Davis made when he spoke to the National Convention of the Methodists. Read them and wonder!
Soviet concentration camps, according to Davis, are "simply places to keep criminals." On the jailing of innocent people, the shooting of those who oppose Russia in the slave nations, Davis has this to say: "If Russia sends innocent people to concentration camps and tightens up civil liberties, it's the fault of the American government." Just how is not revealed. He further says: "In the last thirty years the Soviet Union has a record for peace the equal of the United States." Again, "Back of all our fear is the demonstrated success in planned economy, first in the Soviet Union, then Poland and Czechoslovakia." I wonder what Davis has read lately?

== Libel suit against Saturday Evening Post (1939-1945) ==
From 1939 to 1945, Davis pursued a libel case against the Curtis Publishing, owners of Saturday Evening Post, then the most widely circulated magazine in the US, for an article in published in 1939. In "Communist Wreckers in American Labor," from the September 2, 1939 issue of the Saturday Evening Post, reporter Benjamin Stolberg described Davis as a "Communist and Stalinist", and said that the American Federation of Teachers was "the only AFL union controlled by the Communists" (at a time when Davis headed the AFT).

Davis hired ACLU co-founder and nationally known lawyer Arthur Garfield Hays to represent him in the suit. Stolberg hired Louis Waldman, an "Old Guard" Socialist and anti-communist labor lawyer. The case reached the New York Supreme Court, with Justice John F. Carew presiding.

=== Plaintiff ===
On December 4, 1939, Davis brought a $150,000 libel suit in Manhattan against Curtis Publishing and Stolberg. Davis testified that, while in Russia, Stalin admitted to him that the USSR supported the CPUSA. He also testified that AFL president William Green had asked him to take "decisive action against the communistic influences" in AFT's Teachers Union Local 5 of New York. He admitted that in the past he had not done enough to fight communism in American labor unions. Dr. Sherwood Eddy, former YMCA president, testified that Davis was a "loyal American who has always attacked the evils of communism, as I have." As proof of damage done, National Youth Administration (NYA) head Aubrey Williams testified that he had refused to hire Davis as NYA's educational director based on the Saturday Evening Post article. Hays rested the case for Davis by calling two last witnesses, Reverend Dr. Harry Emerson Fosdick of Riverside Church (New York) and Rabbi Stephen Samuel Wise of the American Jewish Congress. Dr. Rev. Fosdick stated, based on a 29-year acquaintance, that "Jerome Davis couldn't be a Communist if he tried." Rabbi Wise said, based on more than 30 years of acquaintance, that Davis had "never, never" been sympathetic to communism.

=== Defense ===
Stolberg testified that the late Dr. Henry R. Linville, who left the AFT to form the Teachers Guild, considered Davis a communist or fellow traveler. The defense introduced evidence from former CPUSA head Earl Browder, AFL president William Green, and others to document how Stolberg developed the allegedly libelous article. Waldman read from a book by Browder that showed that religiosity does not preclude adherence to communism. The AFL letter called on the expulsion of communists from the AFT, implying that Davis had failed to do so. In 1935 there was a split between the AFT and Teachers Guild. The defense argued that Davis had a standing reputation as a communist or sympathizer. Former Saturday Evening Post editor William W. Stout testified to that effect; AFT vice president John D. Connors said that Davis followed the Communist party line. AFL vice president Matthew Woll said that even some communists considered Davis a communist, while Stolberg testified that he still considered Davis a communist. American Mercury editor Eugene Lyons, also a former Moscow correspondent, testified that passages from Davis's book The New Russia (1933) showed a "type of Soviet propaganda" which he called a "whitewash of terror." He also said that in 1939, Davis had the reputation of "a fellow-traveling Communist." Georgetown University president Dr. Edmund A. Walsh testified that Davis "accepts the ultimate objective of communism and belongs psychologically and morally to the group that advocates it," though he falls short of 100% advocacy because he is "not prepared to go the last ten per cent". After hearing Curtis Publishing attorney Bruce Bromley read from several books by Davis, Dr. Walsh upped his estimate to "95 per cent" and then "96 per cent."

=== Rebuttal and verdict ===
Former AFT secretary-treasurer Florence Curtis Hanson stated that Davis was not a communist but instead "motivated by humanitarianism." Rev. Dr. Halford E. Luccock, a professor of Homiletics at Yale Divinity School, testified that Davis had criticized the USSR for "disregard of the human values of free speech and its intolerance of religion." He affirmed that Davis was "against the use of violence and terrorism" and no "Stalinist, Communist or labor wrecker." Davis shared letters of advocacy from the Patriarch of the Russian Orthodox Church for services rendered to the church. With the court's agreement, attorney Hays added $100,000, bringing the total suit for damages to $250,000.

On June 8, 1943, Hays summarized Davis's lawsuit as a "patriotic service." That afternoon, just before deliberation began, Judge Carew advised the jury that, under the laws of New York State, "no man has a legal right to be a Communist." On June 9, 1943, the New York Supreme Court discharged the jury for failing to reach a verdict. Justice Carew ordered the jury not discuss their deliberations. On June 14, 1943, New York Supreme Court Justice Louis A. Valente denied a second motion for immediate retrial and set October 1, 1943, as the date to assign retrial action.

=== Settlement ===
On January 18, 1945, Davis settled with Curtis Publishing and Stolberg in court for $11,000 of his $250,000 libel suit, before New York State Supreme Court Justice Ferdinand Pecora.

== Personal and death ==
At the height of anti-Communist concerns in the 1950s, Davis refused to testify against colleagues and acquaintances, and was blacklisted by the House Un-American Activities Committee.

He had one daughter, Patricia Davis, and one adopted son, Wilfred Grenfell Davis.

He died at home in Olney, Maryland, aged 87, on October 19, 1979.

== Papers ==
There are two major sets of his papers:

- University of Oregon holds the "Jerome Davis Papers, 1915-1963," which include correspondence, speeches, articles, book drafts, and manuscripts
- FDR Library holds "Papers of Jerome Davis: 1912 - 1965," which includes subject files plus speech and writing files

== Works ==
Davis wrote more than 20 books and numerous articles, including:

Books Authored

- The Russian Immigrant (New York: Macmillan, 1922)
- Russians and Ruthenians in America; Bolsheviks or Brothers? (New York: George H. Doran, 1922)
- Christian Fellowship among the Nations; A Discussion Course Which Will Help Groups of Young People and Adults to do Straight Thinking on Our Greatest Problem with Roy B. Chamberlin (Boston and Chicago: Pilgrim Press, 1925)
- Adventuring in World Cooperation (Boston and Chicago: United Society of Christian Endeavor, 1925)
- Business and the Church with introduction by Jerome Davis (New York and London: Century Co., 1926)
- Christianity and Social Adventuring edited and with introduction by Jerome Davis (New York and London: Century Co., 1927)
- Labor Speaks for Itself on Religion; A Symposium of Labor Leaders Throughout the World edited and with an introduction by Jerome Davis (New York: Macmillan, 1929)
- Contemporary Social Movements (New York and London: Century Co., 1930)* Report of the Legislative Commission on Jails with a Special Study on the Jail Population of Connecticut (Hartford, 1934)* Capitalism and its Culture (New York: Farrar & Rinehart, 1935)
- Behind Soviet Power; Stalin and the Russians (New York: Readers' Press, 1946)
- Character Assassination with introduction by Robert Maynard Hutchins (New York: Philosophical Library, 1950)
- Peace, War and You with introduction by Clarence E. Pickett (New York: H. Schuman, 1952)
- Religion in Action with an introduction by E. Stanley Jones (New York: Philosophical Library, 1956)
- Citizens of One World (New York: Citadel Press, 1961)
- World Leaders I Have Known (New York: Citadel Press, 1963)
- Disarmament: A World View (New York: Citadel Press, 1964)
- New Russia Between the First and Second Five Year Plans (Freeport, NY: Books for Libraries Press, 1968)
- Russian Immigrant (New York: Arno Press, 1969)

Books Co-Authored

- Labor Problems in America with Emanuel Stein (New York: Farrar & Rinehart, 1940)
- On the Brink with Hugh B. Hester (New York: L. Stuart, 1959)
- Toward the Rising Sun by William Gayley Simpson (New York: Vanguard Press, 1935), introduction

Books Edited

- Introduction to Sociology, edited by Jerome Davis and Harry Elmer Barnes (Boston: DC Heath & Co., 1931)
- New Russia between the First and Second Five Year Plans, edited by Jerome Davis (New York: John Day, 1933

Articles

- "Should America Recognize Russia?" Annals of the American Academy of Political and Social Science 114 (July 1924)
- "Human Rights and Coal," Journal of Social Forces 3:1 (November 1924)
- "An Educative Program for World Peace," Social Forces 4:1 (September 1925)
- "Finding the Truth on Current Issues," Social Forces 4:4 (June 1926)
- "A History of Russia" (review), Social Forces 5:3 (March 1927)
- "The Church of England and social reform since 1854" (review), American Economic Review 21:2 (June 1931)
- "Social Pathology" (review), American Economic Review 23:2 (June 1933)
- "The Meaning of Right and Wrong," Journal of Criminal Law & Criminology 24:24 (Nov/Dec 1933)
- "The Assimilation of Immigrants and Our Citizenship Process," Social Forces 12:4 (May 1934)
- "Education Under Communism Contrasted With That Under Capitalism," Journal of Educational Sociology 9:3 (November 1935)
- "The Social Action Pattern of the Protestant Religious Leader," American Sociological Review 1:1 (February 1936)
- "Towards a Rehabilitation Quotient for Penal Offenders," Social Forces 14:4 (May 1936)
- "The Minister and the Economic Order," Journal of Educational Sociology 10:5 (January 1937)
- "Conflict and Community: A Study in Social Theory" (review), American Sociological Review 2:4 (August 1937)
- "Sociology, Past and Present, in Japan" (review), American Sociological Review 3:2 (April 1938)
- "The Sociologist and Social Action," American Sociological Review 5:2 (April 1940)
- "Stalin" (review), American Sociological Review 5:4 (August 1940)
- "Adult Education in the United States," Journal of Educational Sociology 14:3 (November 1940)
- "Dilemmas of Leadership in the Democratic Process/An Introduction to Public Opinion/The Plans of Men" (review), American Sociological Review 5:6 (December 1940)
- " The Politics of Democracy: American Parties in Action" (review), American Sociological Review 6:1 (February 1941)
- "Prisoners of War" (review), American Sociological Review 7:5 (October 1942)
- "Natural gas trade in North America and Asia" (review), International Affairs 62:3 (Summer 1986)
- "Thirty years of competition," New York Amsterdam News 87:37 (September 14, 1996)
- "Please, reader beware of wolves in sheep clothing," New York Amsterdam News 88:3 (January 18, 1997)
- A little pride? Go figure!" New York Amsterdam News 89:6 (January 29, 1998)

Articles with others

- "Labor Problems in America" with Gordon S. Watkins and Emanuel Stein, American Economic Review 30:3 (September 1940
- "Complementary Roles of the Pediatrician and Educator in School Planning for Handicapped Children" with Raymond L. Clemmens, Journal of Learning Disabilities 2:10 (October 1969)

== Quotes ==
- "If democracy is to endure, capitalism as we know it must go." (From Capitalism and Its Culture, 1935, p. 519.)

== See also ==
- Promoting Enduring Peace
- Young Men's Christian Association (YMCA)

== External sources ==
- Jerome Davis Case (Chicago: American Federation of Teachers, 1937)
