= Maurice Eisendrath =

American activist (1902–1973)

Maurice Nathan Eisendrath
- Born: July 10, 1902; Chicago, Illinois, U.S.
- Died: November 9, 1973 (aged 71); New York City, U.S.
- Occupations: Rabbi, President of the Union of American Hebrew Congregations, American activist

Maurice Nathan Eisendrath (July 10, 1902 – November 9, 1973) was a leader of American Reform Judaism, the head of the Union of American Hebrew Congregations from 1943 until his death, an author, and an activist, particularly active in the U.S. Civil Rights and Anti-war movements of the 1960s. The Maurice N. Eisendrath Bearer of Light Award, one of the highest honors bestowed by the American Reform Movement, is named in his honor.

== Union of American Hebrew Congregations ==
In 1943, Eisendrath was called to Cincinnati to temporarily serve as the Executive Director of the Union of American Hebrew Congregations (UAHC), the congregational arm of Reform Judaism in North America. Three years later, in 1946, Eisendrath was elected as the first President of the UAHC. In 1951, Eisendrath moved the headquarters of the UAHC from Cincinnati to New York City. During Eisendrath's 30-year tenure as the head of the UAHC, the number of Reform congregations within the UAHC grew considerably. In 1956, the UAHC had 536 congregations. By 1970 the number of congregations had grown to 706. Eisendrath's tenure was also characterized by controversy based on his political views and activism. For instance, in 1967, Temple Emanu-El resigned from the UAHC because of "Eisendrath's bombastic public statements." At the time, Temple Emanu-El was not only the largest Reform Synagogue in the North America, it was also located directly next door to the UAHC headquarters.

== Opposition to the Vietnam War ==
In May 1965, Eisendrath included his opposition to the Vietnam War in his report to the UAHC Board of Trustees. He criticized the American government's effort to "stroll the world like 'a star-studded Texas sheriff' to impose our brand of law and order upon the entire world." On April 24, 1967, Eisendrath, Martin Luther King Jr., and other cultural and religious leaders formed the peace action group, Negotiation Now. On this same day, Eisendrath wrote a letter to Martin Luther King Jr. that is preserved by The King Center. In the letter, Eisendrath states that the Vietnam War, the Civil Rights Movement, and the Anti-Poverty Program are "inseparably interwoven in a seamless web." On February 6, 1968, Eisendrath, Martin Luther King Jr., Rabbi Abraham Heschel, Rev. Ralph Abernathy, and Rabbi Everett Gendler led a protest march into Arlington National Cemetery followed by a prayer vigil at the Tomb of the Unknown Soldier.

== Awards and recognition ==
- Awarded the Gandhi Peace Award in 1961.
- The Maurice N. Eisendrath Bearer of Light Award is named in his memory.

== Bibliography ==
- Eisendrath, Maurice (1937). Where Jew and Christian Part. Holy Blossom Synagogue.
- Eisendrath, Maurice (1939). The Never Failing Stream. Macmillan Canada.
- Eisendrath, Maurice (1941). Reading in War-time. Macmillan.
- Eisendrath, Maurice (1964). Can Faith Survive?:The Thoughts and Afterthoughts of an American Rabbi. McGraw-Hill.
