= Suzanne Akhras =

Humanitarian and Politician

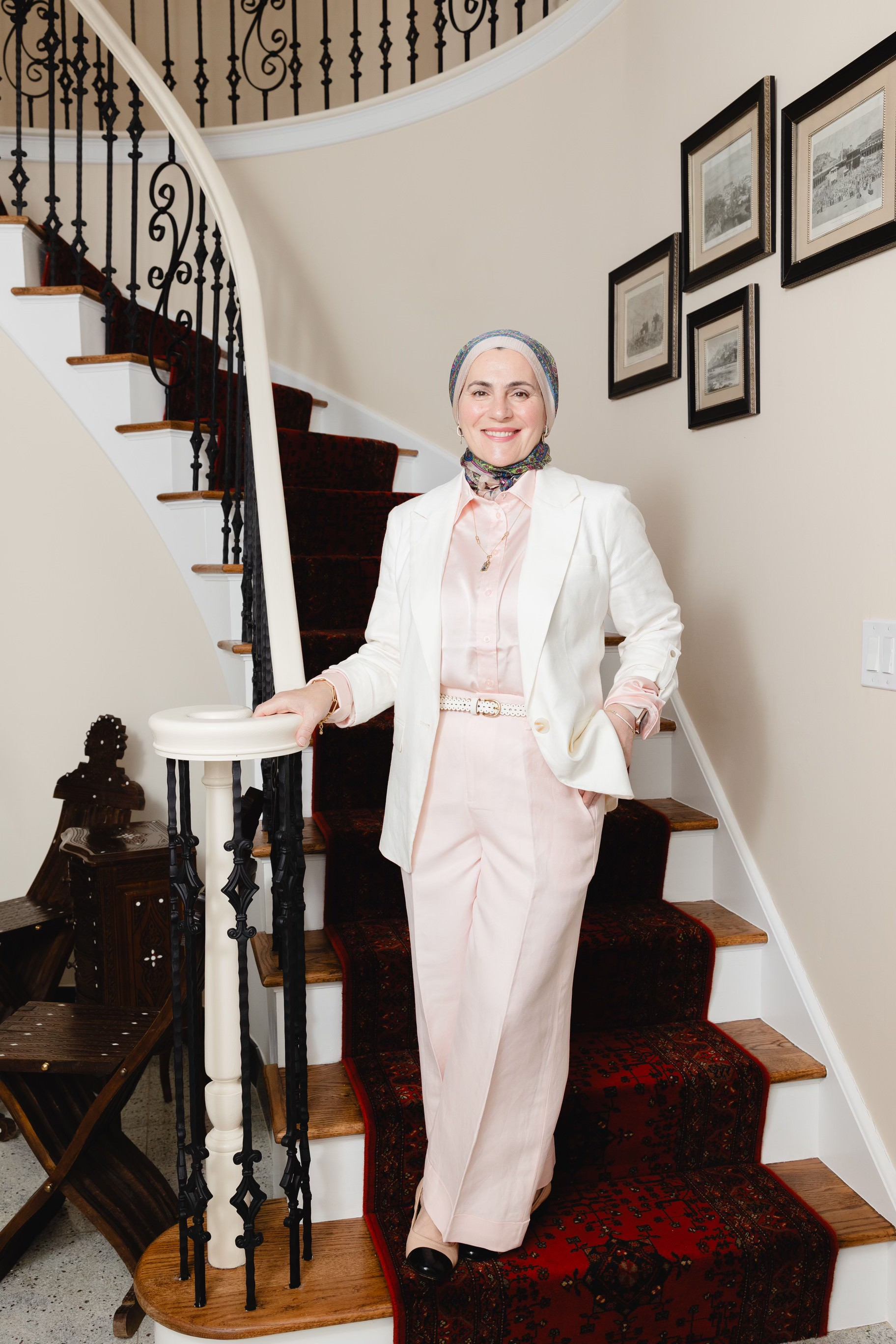
- Born: Syria
- Education: Lewis University
- Occupations: Philanthropist, Community Activist
- Known for: Syrian Refugee Rights Activism
- Notable work: Founder of Syrian Community Network
- Spouse: Zaher Sahloul
- Children: 3
- Website: www.suzanneforil.com

Suzanne Akhras is a Syrian-American humanitarian activist and politician, known for her strong support for Syrian refugees. She is the founder and CEO of the Syrian Community Network (SCN), a non-profit organization based in Chicago, Illinois.

== Early life and education ==
Suzanne Akhras was born in Homs, Syria to a U.S. educated Syrian father and a Canadian mother. Her family migrated to the U.S. when she was 10 years old. After completing her initial education, she earned an Associate of Arts degree from Moraine Valley Community College in 1991. In 1995, she obtained a Bachelor's Degree from the University of Illinois Chicago. Later, in 2012, she earned a Master's Degree in Organizational Leadership from the Lewis University. From 2013 to 2017, she pursued executive education in Nonprofit Management from the Kellogg School of Management, at Northwestern University.

== Career ==
Akhras started her career as a humanitarian activist in 2004 by joining Syrian American Medical Society (SAMS) as a volunteer and helped found the 501(c)(3) charitable arm of the organization and served as the foundation's first president.

In 2015, she founded the Syrian Community Network (SCN) in response to the Syrian refugee crisis, which began in 2011. SCN assists Syrian refugees with their post resettlement needs, providing services such as language assistance, education, and cultural integration programs.

Beyond her role at SCN, Akhras actively serves on multiple boards. She currently serves as the President of the Illinois Community for Displaced Immigrants. Akhras also serves on the Council of Leasers of DuPage Federation on Human Services.

=== Politics ===
In December 2023, it was announced that Akhras will be running as Primary Democratic Candidate for Illinois House of Representatives District 82 in 2024 Elections.

== Recognitions ==
In 2017, she has received humanitarian awards from UNICEF Chicago and the Illinois Coalition for Immigrants and Refugee Rights for her contributions. She was also chosen to serve and continues to serve as a Sisters on the Planet Ambassador through Oxfam America. In 2020, she was inducted into the Moraine Valley Alumni Hall of Fame. In 2022, she received the Nation of Neighbors Award.

== Personal life ==
Akhras has been married to Dr. Zaher Sahloul and the couple have 3 children.
