= UMW General coal strike (1922) =

Strike by coal miners in the US and Canada

UMW General Coal Strike of 1922
- Part of Coal Wars
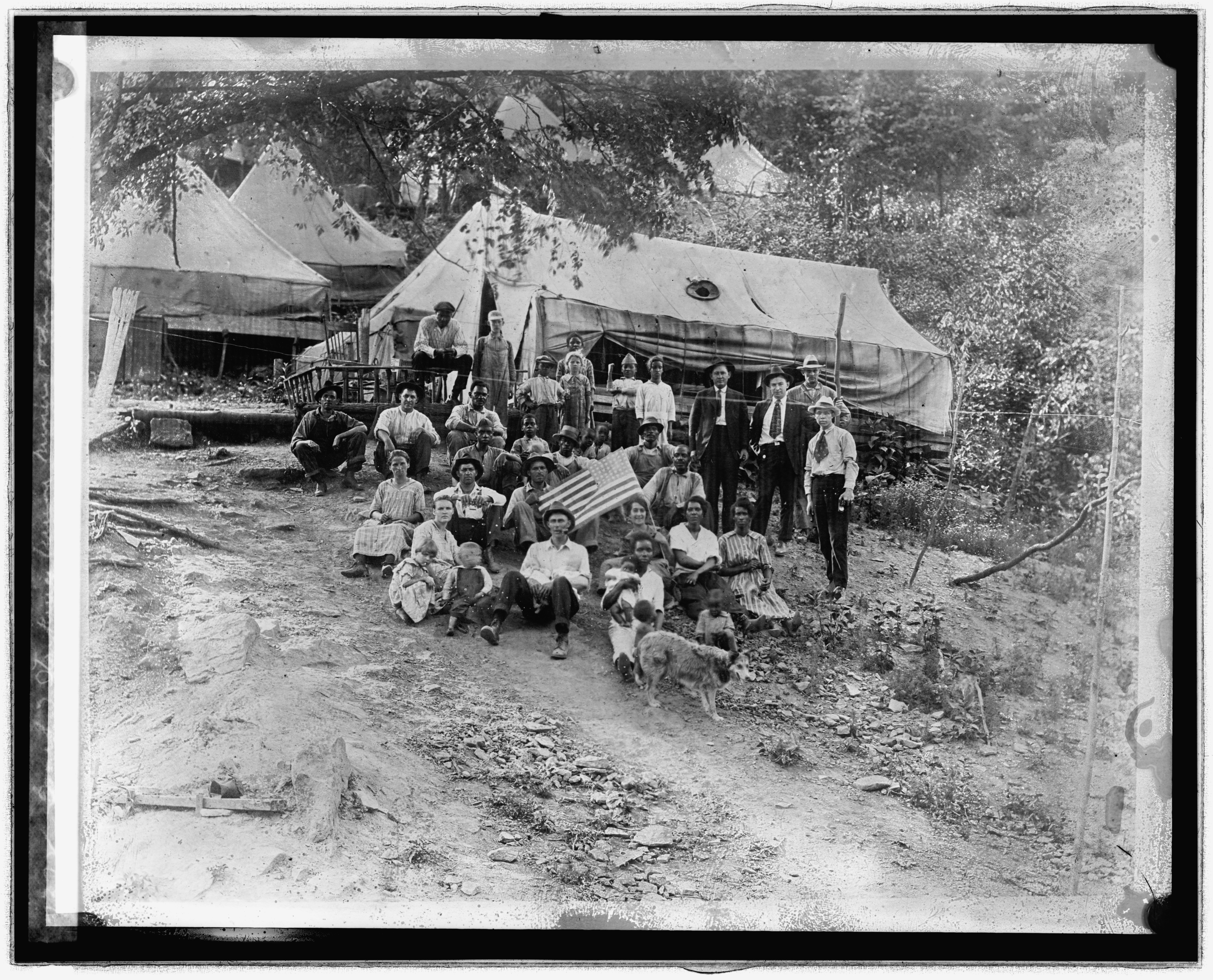
- Group of striking union miners and the families living in tents, Lick Creek, West Virginia. April 12, 1922
- Date: April 1 – September 11, 1922 (5 months)
- Location: North America
- Goals: Renewal of previous contract terms
- Result: Renewal of previous contract terms

Parties
Striking coal miners United Mine Workers	Coal and Mining Industry

Lead figures
John L. Lewis	

Number
~510,000 UMW Miners; ~100,000 Non-Union Miners; 10,000 UMW Pump Operators	

The 1922 UMW Miner strike or The Big Coal Strike was a nationwide general strike of miners in the US and Canada (Note: Excluding Nova Scotia and Newfoundland) after the United Mine Worker's (UMW) trade union contract expired on March 31, 1922. The strike decision was ordered March 22, to start effective April 1. Around 610,000 mine workers struck. About 100,000 of the striking miners were non-union or not associated with the UMW.

== Background ==
Negotiations having failed to produce a contract, on March 22, 1922, union president John L. Lewis ordered the strike to commence on April 1, the day after the expiration of the current contract. More than 600,000 miners went on strike leaving 185,000 miners not on strike; 10,000 of which were union members running the pumps so the mines didn't flood. The Labor World at the time reported the following for many of the states,

"... of the 13,000 Kansas miners, but 1,000 are working ... Colorado, also, has a law which outlaws strikes under certain conditions, but only 4,000 of the 19,000 miners before the strike was called are working.

... Pennsylvania reports that not a man of the 155,000 anthracite miners are working, and but 20,000 of the 175,000 bituminous men are working.

Despite the terroristic policy of West Virginia coal owners, and the aid given them by the state, there are 40,000 of the 90,000 coal miners on strike.

The states that report a 100 per cent strike are: Illinois, 90,000 out; Ohio, 50,000 out; Indiana, 3000 out; Iowa, 15,000 out; Montana, 5,000, out; Michigan, 3,000 out.

Wyoming reports 7,000 on strike while 8,000 were employed before the strike. The same situation is reported by Virginia, Arkansas, New Mexico, Oklahoma and several other states."

In June during the strike, the Herrin mine massacre occurred in Illinois. A month later, on July 1 the Great Railroad Strike of 1922 started. Political comics from the time suggest there was solidarity between the miners and rail workers.

== Aftermath ==
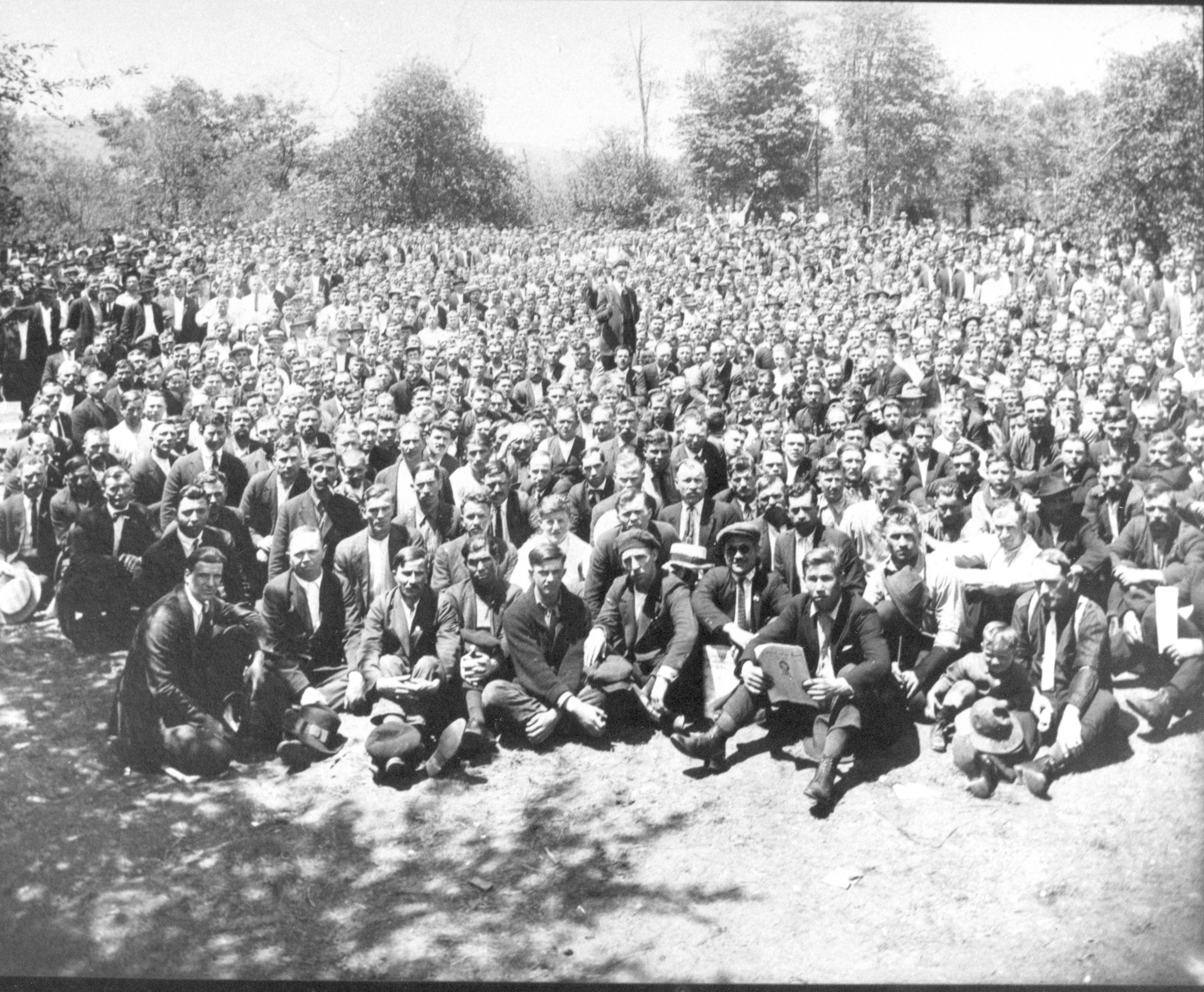
Mass meeting of more than 3,000 striking coal miners held near Windber, PA. in September 1922

A contract was reached on September 2, 1922, it covered members of the UMW extending the agreement terms of the previous contract to August 31, 1923. The Federal Coal Commission was also formed as part of the agreement. After ratification, mining resumed on September 11. The general coal strike lasted 163 days. However non-unionized mining workers were not covered by the UMW contract.

After the UMW ended their strike, around 25,000 Windber, Pennsylvania miners continued striking. Those miners voted to end their strike on August 14, 1923, after failing to gain a contract.

== See also ==
- Great Railroad Strike of 1922
- 1922 New England textile strike
- United Mine Workers coal strike of 1919
- West Virginia coal wars
