= National Arab American Medical Association =

- Formation: 1975
- Type: professional association
- Headquarters: Troy, Michigan
- Location: United States
- Members: 2,274
- Official language: English, Arabic
- President: Rodwan K. Rajjoub, M.D., F.A.C.S
- Key people: President-elect Saad Bitar, M.D., Foundation Chair Subhi Ali, M.D.

The National Arab American Medical Association (NAAMA) is the largest international organization of Arab American physicians and medical students based in the United States. NAAMA was founded as the Arab American Medical Association (AAMA) in 1975 in California by Dr. Kamal Batniji, M.D., as a non-profit, nonpolitical, educational institution seeking to educate and strengthen the ties between people of Arab descent working in various medical fields. In 1980 NAAMA became a national entity, and in 1983 C. Fredrick Milkie, M.D. became the first elected president of the organization. Since that time twenty-seven chapters have been established in the United States and Canada. In 1990 the NAAMA Foundation was created in order to support international medical assistance projects, educational exchanges, scholarships, research grants, and emergency medical aid in areas of conflict.

The organization is affiliated with the American Medical Association(AMA).

== History ==
- 1975: Incorporated in California by Dr. Kamal Batniji, M.D.
- 1978: First International Convention held in Baghdad, Iraq.
- 1979: First National Convention held in Las Vegas, Nevada.
- 1980: Organization switches names from the Arab American Medical Association (AAMA) to the National Arab American Medical Association (NAAMA).
- 1983: First elected president, C. Fredrick Milkie, M.D.
- 1990: The NAAMA Foundation is chartered.
- 1997: First International Symposium held in Damascus, Syria.

== The NAAMA Foundation ==
Tha NAAMA Foundation was formed in 1990 as a vehicle to assist with medical assistance projects, educational exchanges, scholarships, research grants, and emergency medical aid in conflict zones. The foundation has an independent board of directors (liaisons) that run the organization as a separate entity apart from NAAMA.

Internationally, the foundation sponsors projects, focusing on the Arab world. The Foundation provides assistance to Palestinians in Jordan, Lebanon, and Syria, as well as the Occupied Territories; it has also sponsored humanitarian projects in Iraq in the wake of the Iraq War.

In the United States the foundation supports professional and educational activities aimed at Arab American health education and disease prevention in cooperation with the community-based organizations. The foundation has also supported social and human service organizations such as the Community Health Center built by the Arab Community Center for Economic and Social Services (ACCESS) in Dearborn, Michigan; members have also donated their time and money to help the relief efforts following Hurricanes Katrina and Rita.

== Membership ==
As of November 2009 there are 2,274 members in NAAMA.

Membership is divided into seven categories and is open to all persons of Arab descent that are medical students, medical scholars, physicians, retired medical personnel, and family members of any of the aforementioned groups. Annual dues are collected from each member and vary by membership category and chapter affiliation.

== See also ==
- Syrian American Medical Society
