= Rabbis for Human Rights =

Israeli human rights organization

- Founded: 1988
- Purpose: Human rights activism
- Location: Jerusalem
- Region served: Israel, Palestine
- Executive Director: Rabbi Avi Dabush
- Board of directors: Rabbi Ruti Bidatz (Chair)
- Website: www.rhr.org.il/en

Rabbis for Human Rights (RHR) is an Israeli human rights organization that describes itself as "the rabbinic voice of conscience in Israel, giving voice to the Jewish tradition of human rights".

Their membership includes Reform, Orthodox, Conservative, and Reconstructionist rabbis and students. According to their website, the organization brings together over 170 ordained rabbis, rabbinical students, and rabbinic leaders.

The organization received the Niwano Peace Prize in 2006.

== Organization ==
The organization was founded in 1988 by Rabbi David Forman. Its membership consists of Israeli rabbis and rabbinical students across all denominations. RHR is governed by a board of directors, which has been chaired by Rabbi Ruti Bidatz since 2022. The organization's current Executive Director is Rabbi Avi Dabush.

Historically, Rabbi Arik Ascherman served as co-director of Rabbis For Human Rights, becoming executive director in 1998. Ayala Levi took over as executive director in 2010. In the past, the organization received funds from foreign governments and international bodies, including the European Union, the United Kingdom, and Spain.

RHR's operations are divided into four primary departments:

- Territories Department: Provides a protective presence for Palestinian farmers, assists with access to land, and documents human rights violations.
- Social Justice Department: Focuses on promoting social and economic rights within Israel, combating poverty and discrimination, and advancing equal opportunities.
- Education Department: Designs and delivers educational programs focused on human rights, religious pluralism, and tolerance.
- Interfaith Department: Promotes dialogue, mutual understanding, and joint initiatives through interfaith cooperation.

== Activities ==
RHR is best known for dispatching volunteers to act as a protective presence to protect the Palestinian olive harvest from vandalism and assault by settlers living on nearby land; every year, clashes are reported between settlers and Palestinian farmers. In 2008, the volunteer effort encompassed 40 villages. The effort was launched in 2002 when a Palestinian peace activist solicited RHR's help to protect olive pickers against attacks by settlers living near the village of Yanun.

RHR opposes the construction of the Israeli West Bank barrier in any place where it entails the expropriation of Arab-owned land, the division of villages, or cutting farmers off from their fields. RHR achieved a major victory in 2006 when it won a lawsuit to prevent the division by the fence of the village of Sheikh Sa'ad.

In December 2004, former RHR executive director Rabbi Arik Ascherman was among three defendants on trial in Jerusalem for standing in front of bulldozers in an effort to block the demolition of Palestinian homes in East Jerusalem. He was charged with "interfering with police performance of duties on two occasions in 2003, and the intention to commit acts to prevent police from performing their duties." In March 2005, a magistrate court ruled Ascherman guilty, but said that he wouldn't have a criminal record.

In a 2013 video produced for RHR titled Fiddler with No Roof, actor Theodore Bikel appealed to the public to "help prevent a terrible moral tragedy." Bikel drew a direct parallel between the Prawer Plan—which slated 40,000 Bedouins in the Negev desert for eviction from their homes—and the forced expulsion of Jews by Russian authorities depicted in Fiddler on the Roof. Emphasizing the arbitrary nature of the evictions, he likened the situation to the scene where villagers are ordered to leave simply because the authorities have "a piece of paper" commanding it, warning of the severe consequences of refusing such orders.

== Durban UN Anti-Racism conferences ==
David Bedein from Independent Media Review Analysis has criticized RHR, accusing it of joining "forces with the PLO to support the idea that Israel, was indeed, an apartheid, racist regime" at the 2001 UN Anti-Racism conference in Durban, South Africa. Rabbi Ascherman strongly denies this account, saying: "I want to clarify that RHR’s representative at Durban, Rabbi Jeremy Milgrom, actively voiced our criticism of the inflammatory rhetoric and Israel-bashing".

Rabbi Ascherman and RHR also expressed concern about the second Durban conference, saying "that Israel has committed human rights violations [is an issue that] can appropriately be discussed at a conference like this. But if you allow the conference to be hijacked as if Israel is the only place in the world where there are issues of racism and human rights, then it makes a farce of the whole thing. We're not trying to protect Israel from being criticized, but as people who are really concerned with human rights and racism, and think it is important that there be a body among the community of nations dealing with these things, we don't want to see another hijacking."

== Awards ==
- 1993: The organization won the Speaker of the Knesset Quality of Life Prize for its contribution to promoting the rule of law, democratic values, protecting human rights, and encouraging tolerance, mutual respect, and good neighborliness.
- 2006: The organization was awarded the Niwano Peace Prize.
- 2009: The organization received the Yeshayahu Leibowitz Award.
- 2011: The organization, specifically through the leadership of Rabbis Arik Ascherman and Ehud Bandel, was awarded the Gandhi Peace Award by Promoting Enduring Peace.
