= Edwin T. Dahlberg =

American Baptist church leader (1892-1986)

Edwin T. Dahlberg (27 December 1892 – September 1986) was an American Baptist church leader. He was known for his strong efforts to promote social justice and peacemaking.

== Biography ==
The Reverend Edwin T. Dahlberg was President of American Baptist Churches USA, (1946–1947) and President of the National Council of Churches USA (1957–1960). He helped found the Fellowship of Reconciliation and the Baptist Peace Fellowship. He advocated pacifism during World War II, the Korean War and the Vietnam War, ultimately receiving the Gandhi Peace Award. A graduate of Colgate Rochester Divinity School, he later served as trustee of his alma mater.

American Baptist Churches USA named the Dahlberg Peace Award after pastor Dahlberg. In 1964 Martin Luther King Jr. was the first recipient.

== Selected works ==
- Youth and the Homes of Tomorrow (1942)
- The Book of Revival (1951)
- In the Unity of the Faith (1960)
- This is the rim of East Asia (1962)
- Herald of Evangel;: 60 years of American Christianity (1965)

== Quote ==
For where the need of the world and your talents meet, that is where you are called of God to go.

— Rev. Edwin T. Dahlberg,

== Other sources ==
Dahlberg, Keith Edwin T. Dahlberg, Pastor, Peacemaker, Prophet (Valley Forge, Pennsylvania: Judson Press 1998)ISBN 978-0817012779
