= Lick Creek, West Virginia =

- Unincorporated community
- Location within West Virginia Location within the United States
- Coordinates: 37°29′04″N 80°54′41″W
- Country: United States
- State: West Virginia
- County: Summers
- Elevation: 1,611 ft (491 m)
- Time zone: UTC-5 (Eastern (EST))
  - Summer (DST): UTC-4 (EDT)
- Area codes: 304 & 681
- GNIS feature ID: 1549783

Lick Creek is an unincorporated community in Summers County, West Virginia, United States. Lick Creek is located near the west bank of the New River, 21 miles (34 km) south of Hinton.

The community takes its name from nearby Lick Creek.

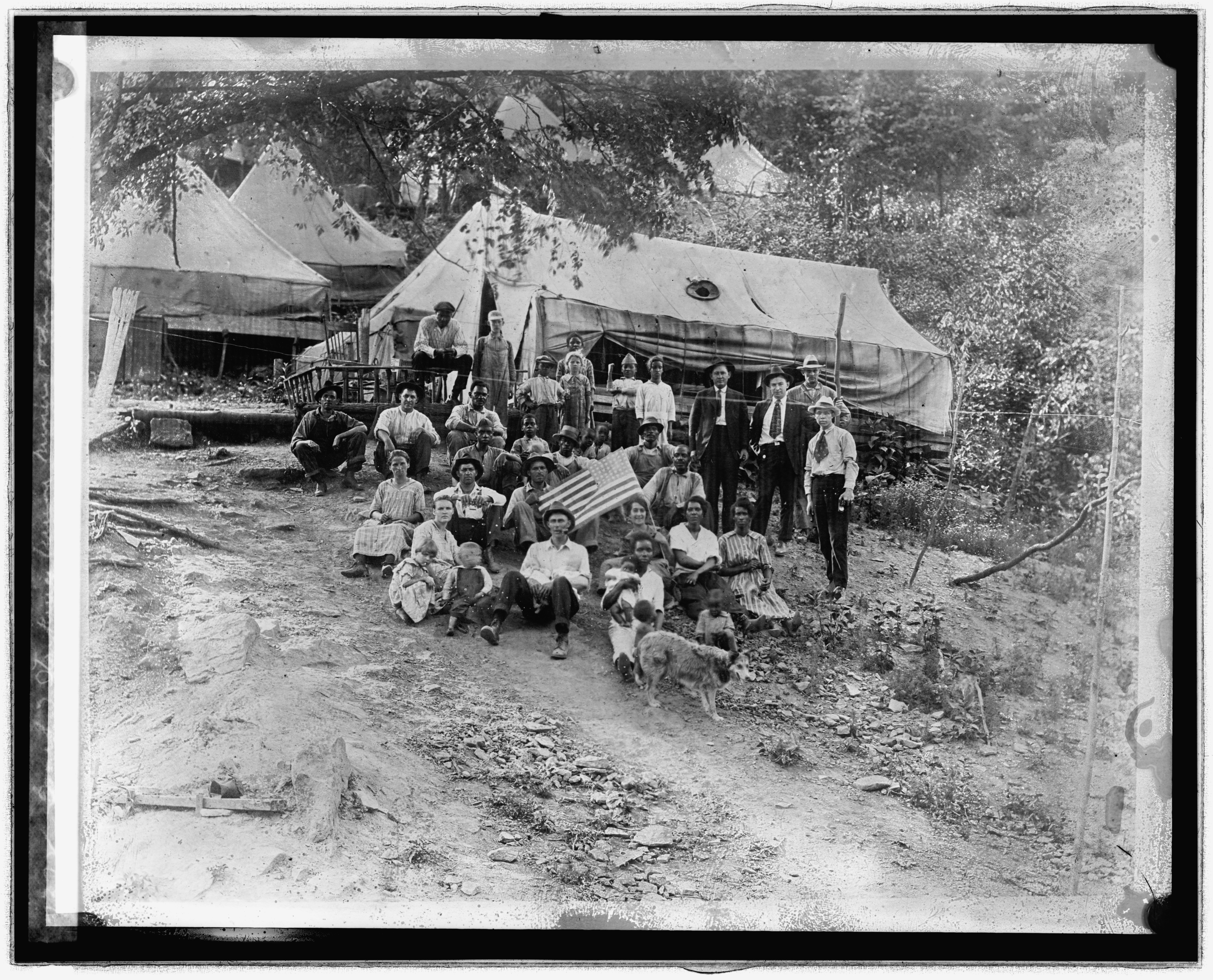
Group of striking union miners & the families living in tents. Lick Creek, West Virginia during UMW General coal strike.
-April 12, 1922
