= Arik Ascherman =

American rabbi

Arik Ascherman אריק אשרמן
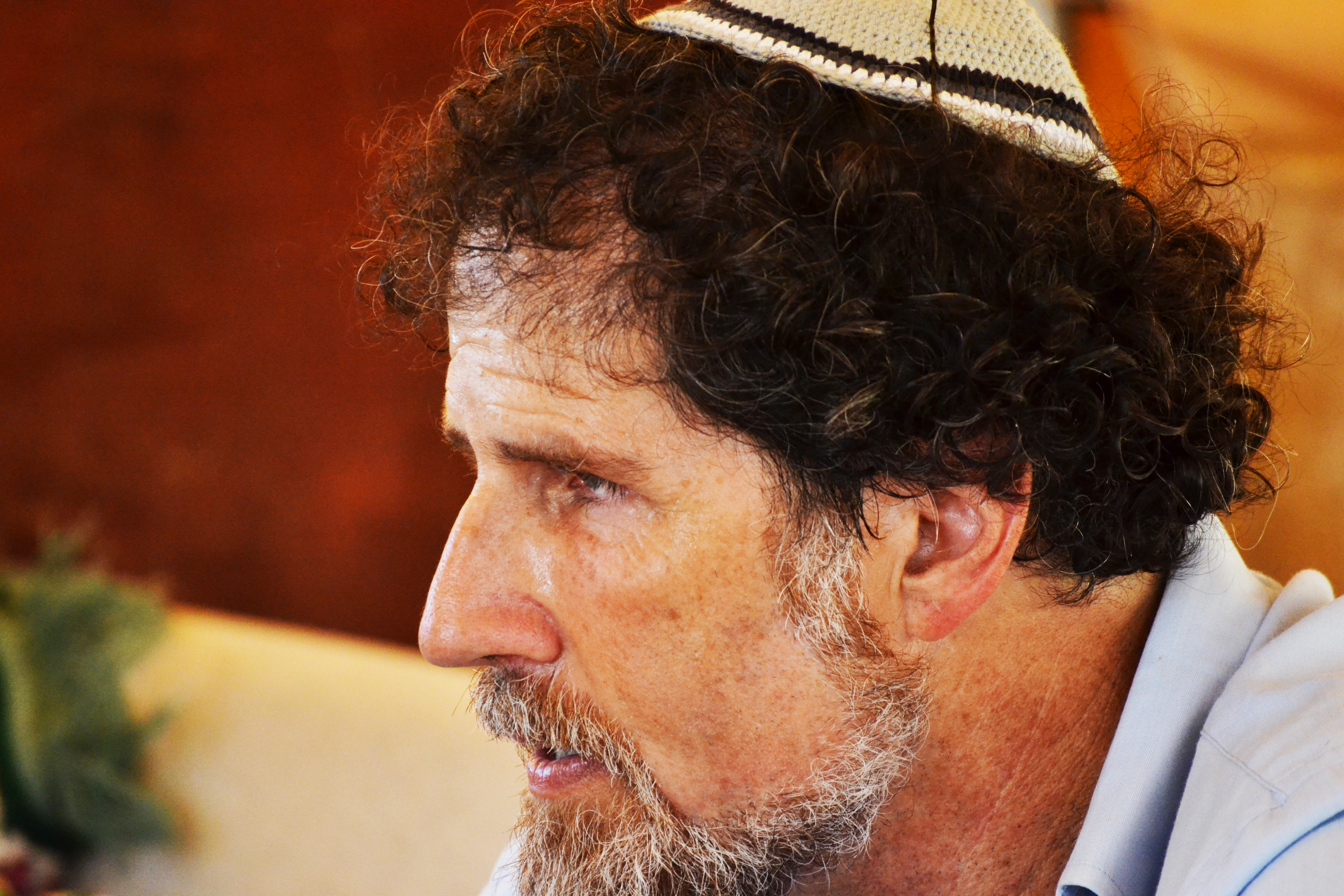
- Rabbi Arik Ascherman in 2012
- Born: Arik Ascherman; 1959 (age 66–67); Erie, Pennsylvania, U.S.
- Known for: Long time executive director of Rabbis for Human Rights

Arik Ascherman (Hebrew: אריק אשרמן; born 1959) is an American-born Israeli rabbi, and executive director of the Israeli human rights organization Torat Tzedek-Torah of Justice. For 21 years, starting in 1995, he served as co-director (1995–1998), executive director (1998–2010), director of special projects (2010–2012) and president and senior rabbi (2012–2017) for Rabbis for Human Rights, an Israeli organization.

As a human rights activist and a follower of Reform Judaism, he has spearheaded activities to defend Palestinians against Israeli settler violence, worked for socioeconomic justice for Israelis, and advocated on behalf of Israel's Bedouin citizens. He has been frequently attacked and subject to beatings by settlers, and has stood trial several times for acts of civil disobedience. He appears in the 2010 documentary Israel vs Israel. He is fluent in both Hebrew and Arabic.

Rabbi Eric Asherman confronts a hilltop youth who trespassed with a herd into a private Palestinian field and tries to steal water. Kafr Malik April 2024

== Biography ==
Ascherman grew up in Erie, Pennsylvania, and attended Harvard University. Though he planned to attend rabbinical seminary immediately after graduation, he was not accepted, and encouraged to reapply after gaining some real-life experience. He joined Interns for Peace, a coexistence project which sent him to the Israeli Arab city of Tamra and the Israeli Jewish city of Kiryat Ata to work from 1981 to 1983. After that, he returned to the United States to complete his rabbinical training. He immigrated to Israel in 1994. He attributes his interest in activism on behalf of universal human rights to the rabbinic concept of tikkun olam (lit. "repairing the world"), referring to universal human rights and social justice. He draws his inspiration specifically from a remark in the Mishnaic ethical tract Pirkei Avot: "In a place where there are no men (decent people) strive to be a man."

Ascherman actively protects Palestinian citizens and farmers against Israeli police and settlers. In 2002, he intervened in the questioning of two Muslim women representatives of the International Women's Peace Service in the Palestinian village of Haris. He accompanied them to an Israeli police station. Here they were accused of obstructing police activities and incitement to riot after they questioned Israeli soldiers who had fired live ammunition into the village. Ascherman translated documents for them and drove them back to Jerusalem after their release eight hours later.

Ascherman and Rabbis for Human Rights were known for dispatching volunteers to act as human shields to protect the Palestinian olive harvest from vandalism and assault by settlers living on nearby land; every year, clashes are reported between settlers and Palestinian farmers. In 2008, the volunteer effort encompassed 40 villages. The effort was launched in 2002 when a Palestinian peace activist solicited RHR's help to protect olive pickers against attacks by settlers living near the village of Yasuf.

According to Nicholas Kristof, writing in The New York Times, Ascherman's car has been stoned by Palestinian youths and he has been arrested and beaten up by Israeli security forces and settlers. In 2004 to 2005, he was tried for civil disobedience after obstructing a bulldozer as it was demolishing houses in East Jerusalem. In March 2005, he was convicted, he agreed to 120 hours of community service, and the conviction was expunged. He was arrested again in March 2008 after witnessing an attack on Palestinians in Silwan. When he went to give testimony, he found himself accused of "inciting Palestinians to oppose the police" near the ongoing archaeological dig in the City of David.

In 2006, Rabbis for Human Rights, the Association for Civil Rights in Israel and five Palestinian local councils won a landmark Israeli High Court case requiring Israeli security forces to allow and protect the access of Palestinian farmers to all of their agricultural lands. As a result, many Palestinian farmers today work lands that settlers or the army had prevented them from working for many years.

Rabbi Ascherman casts his position as a moral and religious one rather than a political one, as he stated at his 2005 trial:

That moral inheritance tells us that the policy of home demolition is immoral. It may be technically legal according to Israeli law narrowly interpreted. However, not everything that is legal is just. The policy is certainly illegal according to international law and tramples on the Torah, which I as a rabbi am sworn to uphold. The Torah commands us to love those different to us, not to have double standards and to have one law for all.

During his tenure at Rabbis for Human Rights, the organization expanded into the field of socioeconomic justice for all Israelis. RHR led efforts that ended of the "Israeli Wisconsin Plan" in 2010, was active in the social protest movement of 2011, and was instrumental in creating the "Public Housing Forum." RHR also began to teach in pre-army academies and created "human rights yeshivas" at Israeli universities and colleges. RHR also began to advocate for African asylum seekers in Israel.

Hilltop youth throw stones at rabbi Arik Ascherman, Mukhmas December 2025

In August 2016, Rabbi Ascherman and two additional RHR senior staff people left Rabbis for Human Rights to found an interfaith human rights organization, "Haqel (The Field) – Jews and Arabs in Defense of Human Rights. In 2017, Rabbi Ascherman left Haqel, and founded "Torat Tzedek-Torah of Justice." Torat Tzedek is seeking to stop the chipping away at the 2006 High Court decision, accompany and protect Palestinian shepherds, advocate on behalf of the "unrecognized" Israeli Bedouin villages in the Negev, and for public housing for Israelis. Rabbi Ascherman continues to be active in "HaMaabarah", a public housing advocacy collective he helped found in 2011.

== Awards ==
- 2002: Torch Lighter in the Yesh Gvul Alternative Israeli Independence Day Ceremony
- 2005: Abraham Joshua Heschel Award of the "Jewish Peace Fellowship"
- 2006: Humanitarian Achievement Prize by the "Wholistic Peace Institute"
- 2009: Keter Shem Tov Prize awarded by the Reconstructionist Rabbinical College
- In 2009, he was co-recipient (with Alice Shalvi) of the Leibowitz Prize, presented by the Yesh Gvul.
- In 2011, he was co-recipient (with Rabbi Ehud Bandel, a co-founder of Rabbis for Human Rights) of the Gandhi Peace Award, "for their nonviolent methods of resolving human rights abuses in Israel and the Occupied Territories".
- 2014: Honorary Doctor of Divinity from HUC-JIR
- 2015: Honorary Doctor of Divinity from Chicago Theological Seminary
- 2016: Tikkun Magazine Award
- In 2019 The Rabbi David J. Forman Memorial Fund awarded Rabbi Ascherman and Torat Tzedek the Fund's Human Rights Prize for the Jewish year 5779.
- Under Rabbi Ascherman's leadership, Rabbis For Human Rights won the Niwano Peace Prize in 2006.

== Publications ==
- "Born with a Knife in Their Hearts: Children and Political Conflict" in Nurturing Child and Adolescent Spirituality: Perspectives from the World's Religious Traditions edited by Yust, Sasso, Johnson and Roehikepartain, 2005
- "On the Human Rights of the 'Other" in Judaism: The Israeli Context" (Hebrew) in Human Rights and Social Exclusion in Israel edited by Ya'ir Ronen, Israel Doron, Vered Slonim-Nevo, 2008
- "Does Judaism Teach Universal Human Rights" in Abraham's Children edited by Kelly Clark, 2012
- "The Little Acts That Tip The Scales" in Defending Hope – Dispatches from the front lines in Palestine and Israel edited by Eoin Murray and James Mehigan, 2018

== Personal life ==
Ascherman is married to Dr. Einat Ramon, the first Israeli-born woman ordained as a Conservative rabbi. They and their two children reside in Jerusalem.

== See also ==
- List of peace activists
