= Promoting Enduring Peace =

US nonprofit organization

- Formation: January 1, 1952
- Founder: Dr. Jerome Davis
- Type: Educational
- Legal status: 501(c)(3) Organization
- Location: 39 Goodrich Street on the New Haven-Hamden line in Connecticut
- Website: http://pepeace.org, http://peacenews.org

Promoting Enduring Peace (PEP or PEPeace) is an American peace advocacy organization based in Connecticut. It is sometimes referred to as PeaceNews.org, the name of its website.

PEP was founded in 1952 by Dr. Jerome Davis. Its original purpose was resisting the ideology of ceaseless aggression and nuclear terror that characterized the Cold War. It was incorporated as a tax-exempt educational organization in 1958 and reincorporated as a 501(c)(3) charitable-educational organization in 2008.

Its principal programs have been peace education, citizen diplomacy, and the awarding of the Gandhi Peace Award to recipients such as Eleanor Roosevelt, Cesar Chavez, and Daniel Ellsberg. More recent awardees have included Amy Goodman (2012), Bill McKibben (2013), and Medea Benjamin (2014).

== Organization ==
PEP is a membership organization, with "activist" (voting) and "supporting" (non-voting) members. Its offices are based near the New Haven-Hamden line in Connecticut. According to a Guidestar review of its allocation of funds, because it has accumulated assets from decades of member donations that are sufficient to cover its modest administrative costs, contemporary donations to PEP from individuals can be allocated entirely to programming.

== Mission ==
PEP's mission, reformulated in 2007 to respond to the post-Cold War circumstances of the early 21st century, is to contribute to transforming the primary social paradigm from one of competition to cooperation, from a culture of violence and war, to a global commonwealth devoted to the wellbeing of all. The updated mission statement recognizes that issues previously considered as separate and discrete, in fact are intertwined and increase risk to peace and sustainability in the world, paralleling the convergence of systems that characterizes globalization. PEP believes that a rapid and peaceful transition is required from an unsustainable civilization steeped in institutionalized violence, exploitation, and profligate consumption by some peoples, to a commonwealth based on universal harmony, mutual respect, and a love of the Earth and all its beings. PEP is devoted to putting significant effort and resources to achieving a fusion of peace, environmental, and social movements, in the belief that these causes are interdependent and no society can succeed unless all succeed.

== Gandhi Peace Award ==
The Gandhi Peace Award is given in person to t awardee during a ceremony held for that purpose in Connecticut or New York City, usually once each year. Since 2011 the Award has been accompanied by a cash prize. Nominations are accepted from PEP members. Nominees are distinguished by having made, over a period of years, a significant contribution to the promotion of an enduring international peace founded on social justice, self-determination, diversity, compassion, and environmental harmony, achieved through cooperative and nonviolent means in the spirit of Gandhi. On March 13, 1959, PEP founder Jerome Davis formally proposed that a yearly award be given "for contributions made in the promotion of international peace and good will." Brief bios of every Award recipient are found at PEPeace.org/gandhi-peace-award.

== Other peace education activities ==
PEP's peace education activities include publishing daily and weekly peace news updates. These emphasize the connection between peace and environmental harmony, and PEP also co-sponsors a daily environmental news update. Additionally, it makes available articles and other peace resources online.

Prior to the Internet, PEP distributed materials by mail to all who requested them; during the Vietnam War period alone, PEP mailed more than 10 million articles encouraging peace to educators and organizers in numerous countries.

In 1975 PEP presented Uncloaking the CIA at Yale University, the first national conference to expose the dangers of unregulated CIA activities in 1976. A book of the same name was developed from the conference proceedings and published in 1978 (edited by Howard Frazier). A principal conference organizer was Martin Cherniack, then a student at the Yale School of Medicine. After completing his medical degree, he later served as president of the organization for 18 years. A conference is planned on the integration of the peace and environmental movements to achieve a sustainable, peaceful civilization.

== Citizen diplomacy activities ==
By organizing groups of Americans to visit the USSR, Cuba, Costa Rica, China, and Mongolia during and after the Cold War, PEP has given ordinary citizens a chance to get to know "the Other." Most participants report having positive, lifelong memories of these visits, and forming new friendships and renewed hope for a peaceful world. As an example, in 2002 a PEP citizen diplomacy delegation journeyed to Vietnam to contribute to healing the deep scars left by the 1960–1974 U.S. warfare there. In 1978 it conducted reciprocal tours of the Volga River in Russia and the Mississippi River in 1978 by citizen delegations from the Soviet Union, the United States, and other nations.

== Fusion of progressive movements ==
PEP co-sponsors numerous events conducted by other peace, environmental, and social justice organizations, such as the conference on human rights held at Quinnipiac University in 2008. The stated strategy is to take the "long view" rather than respond to each new crisis as it occurs. In 2003 PEP coordinated with other Connecticut peace groups to provide trains conveying thousands of people to demonstrations in New York City opposing the George W. Bush Administration plan to invade Iraq. PEP is developing a long-term "think tank" activity intended to create cogent source documents encouraging the productive interaction and mutual support of the peace, environmental, and social justice movements.

== Links to Christian Left ==
Though it is a secular organization, its roots are in the Christian Left. PEP leaders and members continue to cooperate with members of the progressive religious community. In its early years PEP was led by Davis and Dr. Roland Bainton, both Yale professors (Religion and Divinity School, respectively), and its executive directors were retired Christian ministers. Howard T. Frazier, the first president of the Consumer Federation of America, served nearly two decades as PEP's Executive Director, the longest tenure to date. He developed and conducted the programs and activities from 1978 until his death in 1997. He was assisted by his wife Alice Zeigler Frazier, who was later appointed as co-director.

== Existential challenge ==
PEP's activities were interrupted from 2005 to 2008. It was involved in litigation after a few members affiliated with other groups attempted to have it dissolved so that its assets could be distributed to those groups. This attempt was blocked by the Office of the Attorney General of Connecticut and a court order providing for the continuance of PEP and the establishment of the Peace and Social Justice Fund at the Community Foundation for Greater New Haven. It was endowed with a portion of PEP's assets and authorized to award grants for projects substantially similar to PEP's traditional activities (peace education, citizen diplomacy, and work toward a sustainable world peace). Groups seeking funds from PEP are referred to that Fund to apply for grants.
