= Hugh B. Hester =

United States Army general

Hugh Bryan Hester
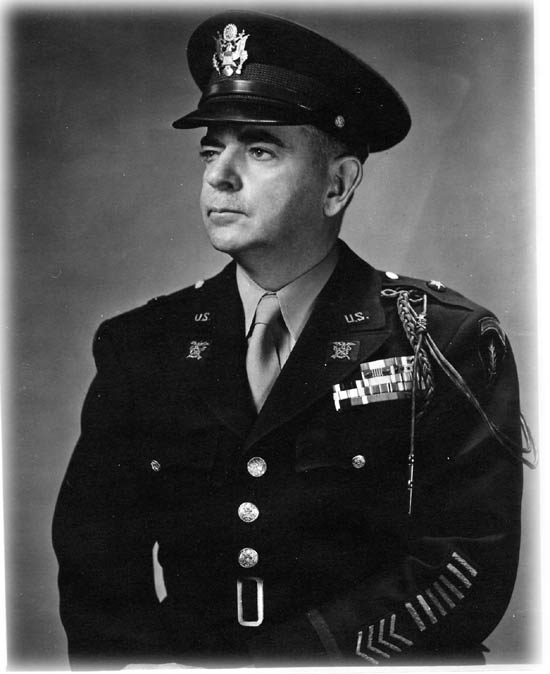
- Hugh Bryan Hester
- Born: August 5, 1895; Hester, North Carolina
- Died: November 25, 1983 (aged 88) Asheville, North Carolina
- Allegiance: United States of America
- Branch: United States Army
- Service years: 1917 - 1951
- Rank: Brigadier General
- Conflicts: World War I: Battle of Belleau Wood; Château-Thierry campaign; Meuse-Argonne offensive; World War II: New Guinea Campaign; Philippines Campaign (1944–45); Occupation of Japan
- Awards: Silver Star; Croix de Guerre; Legion of Honor
- Spouse: Pauline Hester Green

Hugh Bryan Hester (August 5, 1895 – November 25, 1983) was U.S. Army Brigadier General. He was a decorated officer in both World Wars. Later in life, he was a noted critic of U.S. foreign policy.

== Education and career ==
Hugh Hester was born in Hester, North Carolina, and attended the University of North Carolina, graduating in 1917. Hester enlisted in the Army during World War I and became a second lieutenant in the 12th Field Artillery of the 2nd Infantry Division. In 1918, he was promoted to captain and participated in the occupation of Germany in 1919. He was wounded in action and was awarded the Silver Star and the Croix de Guerre.

After the war, Hester worked as an ROTC instructor (1924–1928) at the University of Missouri. In the 1930s, he joined the Quartermaster's Corps, working in New Mexico, and gaining the rank of colonel. A career officer in the army, he served under General MacArthur in the Pacific Theater, in supply and procurement (1942–1945). After the war, he became chief of the U.S. Food and Agriculture Program in Germany. This led to the award of the French Legion of Honor. In 1947–48, Hester was appointed the military attache to Australia. He worked as commanding General of the Philadelphia Quartermaster Depot until his retirement as a brigadier general in 1951.

== Later years ==
After retirement from the Army, Hester studied at University of North Carolina at Chapel Hill, University of Pennsylvania, and George Washington University, in the areas of law and international relations, but did not earn a degree. Hester was an outspoken opponent of U.S. foreign policy for the remainder of his life. In the summer of 1957, he took a 12,000 mile trip through the Soviet Union. He met with Nikita Kruschev and advocated for peace in letters to the New York Times multiple time. In 1959, he published a book, "On the Brink", with sociologist Jerome Davis. It expressed concerns about the Cold War and suggested that new U.S. policies were needed. Hester was a common speaker at peace rallies in the 1960s and authored many opinion and editorial pieces. He was a special correspondent for The Nation, The Churchman, and U.S. Farm News, as well as a speaker on the lecture circuit. General Hester was designated the honorary commander of a Vietnam Veterans Against the War protest march in 1970. He became involved in the Fair Play for Cuba Committee.

Hester opposed the Vietnam War and supported the Vietnam Veterans Against the War organization. In 1971, he published "Twenty-Six Disastrous Years" which criticized U.S. foreign policy. Hester argued for disarmament, weapons control, and world government.

He was one of the signatories of the agreement to convene a convention for drafting a world constitution. As a result, for the first time in human history, a World Constituent Assembly convened to draft and adopt the Constitution for the Federation of Earth.

== Personal life ==
Hester was born in Hester, North Carolina, on August 5, 1895, to William Alexander Hester and Marietta Bullock (Hester). He married Pauline Hester Green in 1935. She died in 1980. Hugh Hester died of cancer at Oteen Veterans Administration Hospital in Asheville, North Carolina, on November 25, 1983.

In 1987, his estate endowed the Hester Center of Peace and Justice at Mars Hill University.
