= Syrian American Medical Society =

Organization

- Abbreviation: SAMS
- Formation: 1998; 28 years ago
- Type: non-profit non-political professional organization
- Locations: Florida; California; Indiana; Ohio; Oklahoma; Michigan; Texas; Wisconsin; West Virginia; Pittsburgh; Philadelphia; Washington D.C.; Tri-State Area; New England; Midwest; Northwest

The Syrian American Medical Society (or SAMS) is a non-profit, non-political, professional organization representing thousands of Syrian-American medical professionals in the United States that provides humanitarian assistance to Syrians in need. Since the Syrian Conflict began, SAMS has supported field hospitals, clinics, and surgical centers in Syria while assisting Syrian doctors, nurses, and health workers by paying salaries and providing training.

SAMS has sent Syrian-American medical personnel into Syria, Jordan, and Turkey on medical missions, and has shipped medical equipment and other humanitarian aid into Syria. SAMS also supports Syrian refugees in neighboring countries with psychosocial support and medical and social services. In 2014, SAMS reported supporting over 1.4 million Syrians in need.

== History ==
SAMS was founded in 1998 as a professional society for American physicians of Syrian descent. The society provides networking, educational, cultural, and professional services to its members and helps them stay connected to Syria through medical missions, conferences and charitable work. In 1999 SAMS hosted its first annual conference and began medical missions to Syria in 2002. In 2010, SAMS began a telemedicine program and founded the Avicenna Journal of Medicine.

In 2011, when the Syrian Civil War began, SAMS expanded its outreach to meet the growing healthcare needs in Syria. In 2011, they sent their first medical mission to Turkey to provide care to Syrian refugees. SAMS began sponsoring field hospitals and ambulances, training and paying the salaries of Syrian medical personnel, and sending medical equipment and other humanitarian aid to Syria. They also support programs in the surrounding countries providing medical and psychosocial support for Syrians fleeing the conflict. The organization expanded, adding offices in Lebanon, Jordan, and Washington DC, to help meet the healthcare demand in Syria According to its Annual Report SAMS currently operates 94 medical facilities within Syria and has treated 1.4 million patients.

As of November, 2015, SAMS has 19 chapters across the US in Florida, California, Indiana, Ohio, Oklahoma, Michigan, Texas, Wisconsin, West Virginia, Pittsburgh, Philadelphia, Washington DC, the Tri-State Area, New England the Midwest, and Northwest.

== Syria programs ==
Since the outbreak of the conflict in 2011, SAMS has helped provide healthcare for Syrians inside Syria and those fleeing the country. SAMS works in conjunction with the United Nations helps deliver medical supplies, medicine, equipment, and financial support within Syria. In 2014, they sent 67 medical containers across the Syrian border. They supply medicine including antibiotics, anesthesia, and pain medication, and medical supplies such as blood bags, surgical sets, X-ray machines, gloves, and basic lab kits to areas in need. SAMS also supports ambulances at its medical facilities with fuel, driver incentives, and a budget for supplies. SAMS supports dialysis centers, dental clinics, ICUs, mobile clinics and OBGYN's within Syria.

SAMS runs a telemedicine program for doctors in Syria that allows local medical personnel received consultations and support from SAMS members in the US.

Field hospitals supported by SAMS have been the target of Russian airstrikes.

Field hospitals supported by SAMS were among those to have reported treating victims of chemical weapons attacks.

SAMS has helped vaccinate over 1.4 million Syrian children against polio as part of the Polio Control Task Force.

== Jordan programs ==
SAMS operates the largest medical facility in the Al-Zaatari refugee camp in Jordan and organizes home visits from social workers and psychologists for refugees in the capital of Amman. SAMS organizes medical missions to this clinic several times annually.

== Lebanon programs ==
SAMS runs 2 dental clinics in Tripoli and Bekaa Valley. In February, 2015, SAMS shipped its first medical container to Lebanon from the US to supply 8 medical facilities.

In 2014, 28 SAMS volunteers participated in 4 medical missions to Lebanon including a specific dental mission. SAMS operates 2 multi-specialty clinics which offer free treatment for a variety of illnesses. The Bekaa Valley clinic Bekaa Valley, where offers internal medicine, OB/GYN, pediatrics, general surgery, physiotherapy, dental care, orthopedics, x-rays, ultrasounds, psychiatry, ophthalmology, urology, and basic lab work. This clinic treats an average of 4,000 patients a month. The Tripoli Clinic offers primary care, pediatrics, dental care, OB/GYN, orthopedics, hematology, x-rays, basic lab work, and dialysis treatment and treats 6,500 each month.

SAMS sponsors a psychosocial program in Bekaa Valley which provides psychological care for Syrian refugees. The SAMS-supported Tripoli surgical center performed 2,233 surgeries.

== Turkey Program ==
SAMS operates dental clinics in and around Turkish refugee camps. In the wake of the 2015 Chapel Hill Shooting, which claimed the life of dental students Deah Barakat and Yusor Abu-Salha, an influx of donations in their honor allowed SAMS to help open additional dental clinics in Turkey one of which was named in their honor.

In 2012, SAMS began training Syrian medical personnel in Turkey. The program focuses on advanced critical care skills such as trauma care, gender-based violence recognition, specialty care, primary care, and nurse training.

In August 2014, SAMS began cross-border operations in conjunction with WHO, UNICEF, and UNFPA. SAMS helped deliver supplies to IDP camps and medical facilities in Syria.

== Advocacy ==
SAMS advocates for protection of civilians and medical neutrality during the Syrian conflict. It joined with 130 NGOs for the #WithSyria campaign to show international support for increased humanitarian aid to Syria and greater civilian protection. SAMS has testified before the United Nations Security Council the United States House Committee on Foreign Affairs about the chlorine gas attacks in March, 2015. In October, 2015, SAMS staged a 'Die-in' with Physicians for Human Rights in New York to show solidarity with Syrian health care workers.

== See also ==
- National Arab American Medical Association
