= Lovestoneites =

Communist Party of the USA (Opposition)
- Leader: Jay Lovestone
- Founded: November 1929
- Dissolved: January 1941
- Split from: Communist Party USA
- Ideology: Communism; Marxism; Bukharinism
- International affiliation: International Communist Opposition; International Revolutionary Marxist Centre (1939–1940)

The Lovestoneites were a small faction of communists in the United States during the 1930s which were led by Jay Lovestone, the former General Secretary of the Communist Party USA (CPUSA).

The organization emerged from a power struggle and ideological disagreements within the CPUSA in 1929, particularly Lovestone’s more moderate stance in contrast to hardline Stalinism. Lovestone’s group unsuccessfully sought to reintegrate with the larger CPUSA organization for several years. Membership fluctuated and was small, estimated by various sources between about 350 and 1,500.

Over the course of its existence the Lovestoneite organization made use of four names:

- Communist Party (Majority Group) (November 1929–September 1932)
- Communist Party of the USA (Opposition) (September 1932–May 1937)
- Independent Communist Labor League (May 1937–July 1938)
- Independent Labor League of America (July 1938–January 1941)

The members often referred to their organization as the Communist Party (Opposition) or "CPO."

Activists in the Communist Party (Opposition) played a role in a number of trade union organizations of the 1930s, particularly in the automobile and garment industries. A growing disaffection with the Soviet Union in the years after the Great Purge of 1937–38 ultimately led the group to drop the word "Communist" from its name before its dissolution in early 1941.

== Organizational history ==
=== Origins ===
Party leader Jay Lovestone sharing a platform with ILGWU leader David Dubinsky at a political rally in the 1930s.

The Communist Party (Opposition), known commonly as "The Lovestoneites", was one of two primary opposition organizations which split away from the Communist Party USA in the late 1920s and early 1930s, paralleling factional differences within the Soviet leadership. A so-called Left Opposition centered around James P. Cannon, Max Shachtman and others, supported Leon Trotsky and were expelled in 1928 to form the Communist League of America. Soon thereafter, another cleavage emerged, this time between the supporters of Nikolai Bukharin and Joseph Stalin. When Bukharin was purged from the Soviet leadership, his supporters in various countries, known as the Right Opposition, were also expelled or left the various national parties. In the United States this tendency was led by Jay Lovestone, former General Secretary of the Communist Party.

The group began as the Communist Party, USA (Majority Group) in the fall of 1929, following the expulsion of Lovestone and his factional cohorts from the CPUSA.

The new organization made its presence known with the first number of a new newspaper, The Revolutionary Age, subtitled "An Organ of Marxism-Leninism in the United States." The first issue was dated November 1, 1929, and featured "An Appeal to All Party Members and Revolutionary Workers" above the fold, in which the new "Communist Party USA (Majority Group)" declared itself the continuer of the "glorious traditions" in fulfilling the "tremendous tasks" set by a previous publication of the same name in establishing the American Communist movement in 1919. The organization declared that:

Under the pretext of 'fighting the Rights,' the present leadership of the Communist International has been revising the fundamental principles of Leninism and distorting and destroying the Leninist line of the Comintern. As a result the sections of the Comintern have been thrown into isolation, chaos, and confusion, and the best and most experienced revolutionists driven out and expelled to be replaced by incapable politically bankrupt 'new leaderships.' * * * Against the revision of Leninism, against the destruction of our parties and of their mass influence it becomes the duty of all Communists, of all revolutionary workers to fight.

The officers of the organization named in 1929 included an 11-member Central Committee headed by expelled General Secretary Lovestone and including such former CPUSA stalwarts as Ellen Dawson, Benjamin Gitlow, William Kruse, Bertram D. Wolfe, and Charles S. Zimmerman. The new group also included its own "Young Communist League", headed by an 8-member National Executive Committee, to parallel the official Young Communist League of the CPUSA.

The new "Communist Party (Majority Group)" demanded that the official CPUSA turn away from the "opportunist sectarian" perspective of the Third Period and its use of "ultra-left phrases in the leading campaigns of the party", cease with its mass expulsions of dissidents and immediately reinstate those recently expelled, and "examine and take a stand" against the decisions of the 10th Plenum of the Executive Committee of the Communist International which represented a revision of the decisions of the 6th World Congress of the Comintern. The remaining members of the regular CPUSA met these demands of its expelled dissidents with indifference or hostility.

During its first years, the CP(MG) considered itself a "loyal opposition" to the official Communist Party, a fact reflected by the group's decision to endorse the Congressional and State candidates of the CPUSA in the 1930 elections. An editorial in the party's official organ declared:

...When we call upon the workers to support the Communist Party ticket in the elections we do not do so on the basis of agreement with the Party tactics or the Party's present election platform; we do so because of our agreement with the fundamentals and aims of the Communist Party and the Communist International. We call upon the workers to support the Communist Party ticket as an expression of their agreement with the fundamental aims of Communism but to remember that the dangerous tactics of the official leaders of the Communist Party, which are doing such harm to the cause of Communism, are not the traditional tactics of the world Communist movement.

The Lovestoneites remained loyal to the memory of C. E. Ruthenberg, the former leader of the faction who had died suddenly of acute appendicitis on March 3, 1927, holding public "Ruthenberg Memorial Meetings" in his memory each year and eulogizing him in the party press.

Among those boosted in the pages of The Revolutionary Age and its successor, The Workers Age were the German oppositional communist August Thalheimer, the Mexican artist Diego Rivera, and the Indian revolutionary M. N. Roy. On April 3, 1932, Rivera lectured under the auspices of the Communist Party (Opposition) on "Trends in Modern Art", with his friend Bert Wolfe handling the task of translation.

=== Confrontation with the official Communist Party ===
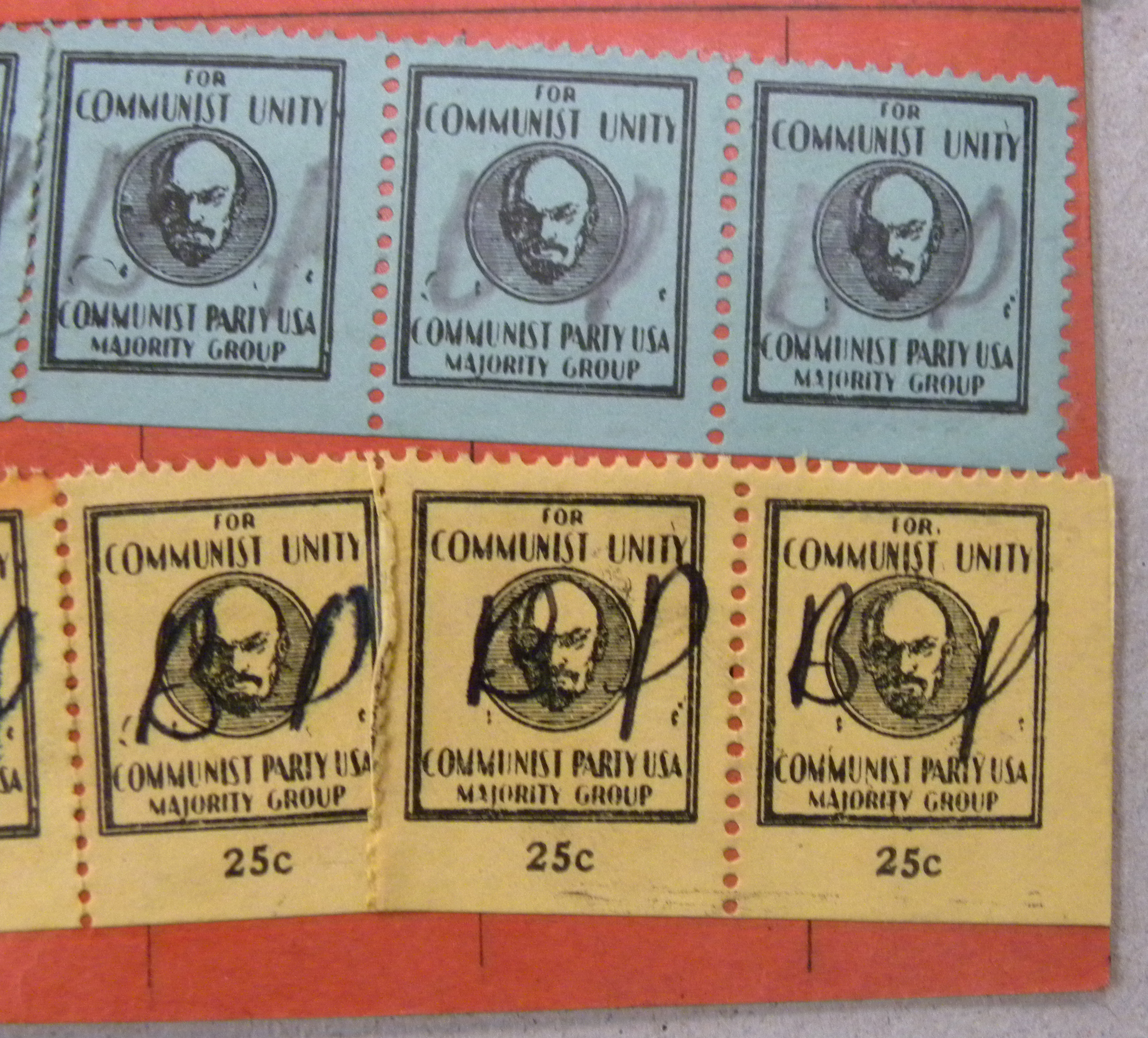
While the weekly dues stamps of the CPMG included the slogan "For Communist Unity", the reality faced by the group's members was sometimes quite different.

In the summer of 1932 the Communist Party (Majority Group) made a strong protest about the use of violence by the official Communist Party against its soapbox speakers on the street corners of New York City. The Lovestoneites charged that

Street meetings of the Communist Party (Majority Group), of the Trotsky group [the Communist League of America], of the IWW, and of the Socialist Party have been smashed by the wild rowdyism and gangsterism of the Communist Party bureaucrats. It seems that the Party leadership intends that every meeting in the coming election campaign which is not an official Communist meeting must not be permitted to take place: either it must be 'turned' into an official Communist meeting or else it must be smashed!

Particular grievous was a street corner meeting held July 8 in Brownsville, New York at the corner of Hopkinson and Pitkin Avenues, which had been attacked by "official 'Communist' hooligans who brandished knives, iron knuckles, and other weapons."

Despite being subjected to such violence, the Lovestoneites nevertheless once again endorsed the electoral ticket of the official Communist Party in the election of 1932, declaring the Republicans and Democrats "stand for this cursed system", while the Socialists "frequently support the conservative union leaders who are doing their best to paralyze the struggles of the workers and to hand them over to the tender mercies of the bosses."

==== Apartment break-in ====
On July 17, 1938, Lovestone's Manhattan apartment at London Terrace, 410 West 24th Street was broken into. Extensive collections of his correspondence, his passport and a gold watch were stolen. At the time Lovestone claimed this was a GPU operation, though the FBI came to the conclusion that it was a hoax perpetuated by Lovestone to obtain a new passport. Hoax or not, the expelled board members lawyer, Maurice Sugar reproduced some of the very documents Lovestone claimed had been stolen at the trial. A special Bulletin, published by the expelled members sympathizers also published some of the documents to prove that Lovestone was behind Martin's attempt to purge them.

Years later the FBI found out further information about the incident while conducting another investigation. The employees at the building apparently belonged to a small Communist dominated union and one of the maids was commissioned to keep tabs on Lovestone's mail. Communist Party agents then rented an apartment above Lovestone's and burglarized it when he was out, taking the bags of correspondence to the other apartment so no one would see them.

Finally, in a letter in the Comintern archive in Moscow, dated Oct 19, 1938 Comintern representative Pat Toohey reported that Lovestone's "entire archive" had come into possession of the Party.

=== International affiliation ===
After initially lending critical support to the Communist International, in the fall of 1930 preparations began to be made for a new "International Conference of the Communist Opposition." Representatives of the CP(MG) collaborated with their comparable others in Germany, Sweden, and Czechoslovakia in a preliminary gathering held in Berlin in March 1930 to organize the event. The call for the founding conference was published over the signature of Heinrich Brandler of the National Council of the "Communist Party of Germany (Opposition)."

The conference was held on December 16 and 17, 1930 in Berlin.

=== Policies mid-1930s ===
CPO members marching in the 1936 New York City May Day parade

The Lovestone group reacted with shock and a sense of urgency to the rise of Adolf Hitler and the Nazis in Germany. The organization urged international unity among labor and radical groups against the Nazis' "express-train speed" efforts to "consolidate their grip on the country and wipe out the labor movement without leaving a trace." The organization clearly continued to hold out hope that it would be invited into the official Communist Party once again, declared that "the turn in tactics must be accompanied by a movement for the unification of the Communist movement, now split up and divided."

For all its aspirations of united action and reintegration into the regular CPUSA, the Lovestone oppositionists began to have ever more serious misgivings about the nature of the regime in the Soviet Union as the "Cult of Personality" began to take root in the 1930s. A May 1933 article by Bert Wolfe in Workers Age mocked the ritualistic torrents of adulation being bestowed upon Stalin as part of an organized campaign in the USSR:

Throughout the Soviet Union today and throughout the Communist International there is an organized campaign for the development of a new 'ism' — 'Stalinism.' Stalin's fiftieth birthday [1929] was celebrated with incense and flattery. His picture is the favorite cover illustration of every periodical from Kino, the movie review, to Krokodil, the humorous magazine. His photograph appears as often and as universally on the Russian magazine covers as the 'Gibson Girl' or Greta Garbo on the covers of American magazines. Towns and factories and clubs and streets are named after him. His speech on the Five-Year Plan was set to music! * * * [A]pparently Stalin insists upon being embalmed and worshipped while still alive!

=== Factional splits ===
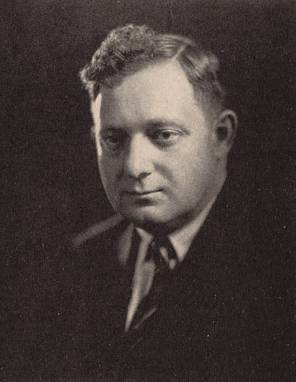
Ben Gitlow, Secretary of the Communist Party Opposition from 1930 to 1932, led a split early in 1933 over the group's unwillingness to criticize forced 'collectivizatio and its consequences in the USSR.

The movement suffered three splits during its existence, only one of which produced a new organization. The first was led by Bert Miller who wanted the sect to unite with the Conference for Progressive Labor Action. When he was unable to convince the leadership of the group to do so, he took a small following into the CPLA himself.

Early in February 1933 former National Secretary Ben Gitlow submitted his resignation from the Lovestone organization, having come to see the general Party line of "mass 'collectivization" and frenetic industrialization in the USSR as "basically wrong" with the matter a "decisive question of fundamental principle." Gitlow presented his views to the 2nd National Conference of the CPUSA(O), which "decisively rejected" them "by a large margin." Soon thereafter, Gitlow submitted his resignation from the organization. He was joined by Lazar Becker in his defection and the pair formed a tiny new grouplet calling itself the Workers Communist League. Gitlow and Becker's new organization soon merged with a group led by B.J. Field to form the League for a Revolutionary Workers Party.

Herbert Zam split with together a small group of supporters in 1934. They had argued that it was useless to continue as an "opposition" intending to reform the Communist Party, and advocated the group declare itself an independent party. When this perspective was not endorsed by the leadership Zam and his supporters joined the left wing of the Socialist Party of America.

== Membership size ==
At no point in its history did the Independent Labor League of America or its predecessors publish membership figures. The size of the group no doubt fluctuated over time and the organization lacked the rigid discipline and regimentation of the official Communist Party USA, to the point that one historian of the Lovestone movement has speculated that "perhaps the Communist Opposition leadership itself did not know the exact number of members at any given time."

Benjamin Gitlow, an early Secretary of the organization who later broke with communism, declared in his 1940 memoir that "the Lovestonites did not attain a membership in excess of three hundred and fifty throughout my connection with the group." Another estimate of the group's numerical strength is provided by Will Herberg, a top leader of the organization throughout its history, who pegged the membership of the Lovestone organization at between 1,000 and 1,500. In the view of the leading scholar of the ILLA and its predecessors, the historian Robert J. Alexander, "Will Herberg's estimate of Lovestoneite membership would seem nearer the facts than that of Gitlow."

The Lovestoneites had as many as nine functioning branches in New York City over the course of the organization, as well as other branches in Austin, Texas, Philadelphia, Wilkes Barre, Fredericktown-Millsboro, Pennsylvania, Pittsburgh, Fort Wayne and Kokomo, Indiana, Chicago, Cleveland, Detroit, Lansing, Muskegon, Pontiac, St. Louis, Boston, New Bedford, Hartford, San Antonio, Los Angeles, Troy, New York, Baltimore, Passaic, New Jersey, Fall River, Massachusetts, and Buffalo. By no means did all of these local units exist simultaneously, but the sheer number and geographic spread of organized branches seems indicative of an organization with more than a few hundred adherents.

== New Workers School ==
The Lovestoneites placed extremely high emphasis upon educational activities. The Lovestone organization was quick to establish its own party school akin to the training institutes of the rival official Communist Party's Workers School and the Rand School of Social Science of the Socialist Party.

Advertised in mid-November 1929 for a December 2 opening and described in an article in mid-December 1929, the Communist Party (Majority Group)'s institute was initially called the "Marx-Lenin School", with Bert Wolfe as director and D. Benjamin (real name, Ben Davidson) as assistant director. Instructors included Jay Lovestone, Ben Gitlow, Charles "Sasha" Zimmerman, Will Herberg, Bert Miller, Herbert Zam, and others in addition to Wolfe and Benjamin. The Marx-Lenin School held a public lecture on Sunday afternoons and conducted its courses during the evening hours, Monday through Thursday. The school was intended "to teach and defend the principles of Leninism within the Communist Party and the working class and to train workers for the class struggle", according to the party at the time of its launch.

The Marx-Lenin School taught courses in beginning and advanced Marxism, American history, the history of the trade union movement, and the history of the revolutionary youth movement in America as well as classes in intermediate and advanced English. Over 400 people were claimed to have registered for the first classes offered by the school, which began in January 1930. The facility was initially located at 37 East 28th Street, 8th Floor, in New York City. In the fall of 1930 it was moved to 63 Madison Avenue, 1st Floor, near 27th Street. By the "Special Summer Term" of 1932 the school had found new quarters once again, this time at 228 Second Avenue, on the corner of 14th Street.

The name of the party's institute was later changed in the fall of 1930 to "The New Workers School" as part of an effort to contrast itself to the Workers School, the successful training program run by the regular Communist Party. At the time of the name change, the Communist Party (Majority Group) noted that "every one of its teachers was formerly a leading teacher of the old Workers School", an institution which "thanks to the wrong line at present prevailing in the Party, is revising and falsifying Leninism and hence no longer serving the purposes for which it is founded."

The second year of classes were headlined by a series of Sunday night lectures by Jay Lovestone on "The Class War Today." Other course titles included, "Fundamentals of Communism", "Program of the Communist International", "Marxian Philosophy", "Social Forces in American History", and "English for Foreign-Born Workers." Very similar courses were taught at the New Workers School in subsequent years, with Modern Monthly editor V. F. Calverton being added to the roster to teach a course on "The Liberation of American Literature" in the fall of 1932.

Courses cost $2.50 per class, with tickets to the headlining presentations by Jay Lovestone available on a single admission basis for 25 cents.

In 1934, the New Workers School was immortalized in American art history by the Mexican muralist Diego Rivera. In 1932, Rivera had been commissioned to paint a fresco measuring more than 1,000 square feet (93 m^{2}) in the RCA Building at Rockefeller Center in New York City. Preliminary sketches for the work were approved in November 1932 and a contract signed calling for the payment of $21,000. In March 1932, Rivera and his helpers moved to New York and began their work. Work progressed rapidly on the complicated work, which featured a central motif highlighting scientific discovery, with flaming red socialist themes in the left background and scenes of militarism and police repression in the background right.

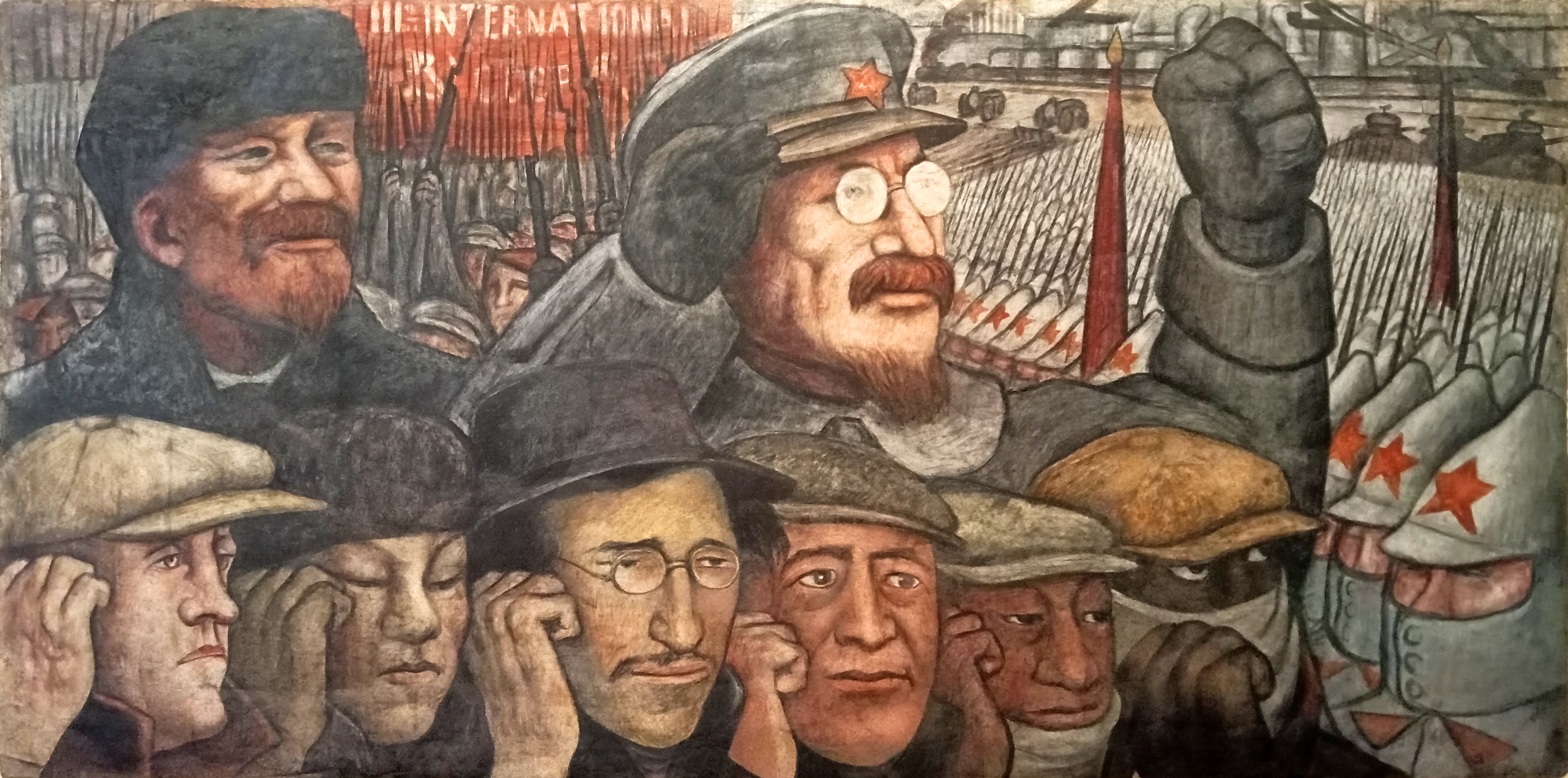
Russian revolution, one of the panels painted for the New Workers School by Diego Rivera.

Unsurprisingly, enormous controversy began to flare up, with the New York World-Telegram opining with an April 24, 1933 banner: "RIVERA PAINTS SCENES OF COMMUNIST ACTIVITY AND JOHN D. JR. FOOTS BILL.". Nelson A. Rockefeller was quick to quash the controversy by pulling the plug on the almost-completed work, paying off Rivera and immediately covering the massive mural before destroying it early in 1934.

After paying for his supplies, the wages of his assistants, and a commission for obtaining the work, Rivera found himself with $7,000 of "Rockefeller money" remaining. He determined to leave New York with a particularly provocative example of his work. He chose the location of the Lovestoneites' New Workers School on West 14th Street, putting up movable walls in the rented building and creating the mural with his assistants at his own expense. The work, entitled "Portrait of America", included 21 panels in all, occupying 700 square feet (65 m^{2}) of wall space.

== Publications ==
Workers Age (formerly The Revolutionary Age) was the official organ of the Communist Party Opposition.

The group issued a periodical during its existence, known as The Revolutionary Age in its first incarnation, a tip of the hat to a periodical of the same name which served as the first official organ of the Left Wing Section of the Socialist Party which emerged as the forerunner of the American Communist Party in 1919. The first editor of the publication was Ben Gitlow, assisted by Bert Wolfe as associate editor. At the time of the 1st National Conference in 1930, Editor Gitlow and Secretary Lovestone traded hats.

In addition to its main periodical, the Lovestoneites launched a short-lived Yiddish periodical, Jewish Monthly Bulletin, in December 1929. At that same time was announced the forthcoming launch of a paper called Revolutionary Youth for its "Young Communist League (Majority Group)" youth section.

The party's Harlem branch, in which Edward Welsh played a key role, additionally published a mimeographed sheet, Negro Voice from 1935 to 1936.

== Canada ==
The Lovestoneites also represented the Right Opposition in Canada. As in the US, an opposition-inclined group had been elected at the Communist Party's latest convention, in June 1929, but the factional differences were still salient. The tendency led by Chairmen Jack MacDonald, William Moriarty and Michael Bushay accepted the new Moscow line, but only grudgingly. Within a few months the Montreal party leadership complained to the Central Committee that Israel Breslow, editor of the party's Yiddish organ, had refused to resign from the Amalgamated Clothing Workers to join the new dual union, and that he was receiving an English language newsletter from the German Oppositionists. The Central committee refused to act, Moriarty even expressing sympathy for the KPO. In March 1930, the ECCI purged Moriarty, MacDonald, Bushay and Breslow.

The Lovestoneites' presence in Canada was largely limited to Montreal, Quebec and Toronto, Ontario. In Montreal, the group was led by Breslow and Bushay. Kalmen Kaplansky took over the leadership when Breslow moved to New York in 1935. The Montreal group set up a Workers Educational League, an adult education center modeled on the New Workers School, participated in ILGWU and railroad strikes and later became active within the Quebec Labor Party, in which Kapansky served on the executive committee.

The Toronto area group was led by Moriarty. This group was active in organizing the unemployed in nearby Hamilton and East York. They were also active within the Co-operative Commonwealth Federation. In fact Moriarty led the fight to have "violent change" and "confiscation of property" included in that groups Regina Manifesto. Both sections of the Canadian Opposition had fizzled out by the end of 1939.

== National conferences ==
Decision-making conclaves of the ILLA and its predecessors were known by a variety of names. All gatherings were held in New York City except for "Midwest Conferences", which were held in Chicago.

Year	Dates	Name of gathering	Delegates	Comments
1929	October	Enlarged Session of National Committee		Establishes Communist Party (Majority Group) and elects a 49-member National Council.
1930	February 22–23	2nd Plenum of the National Council	60	
1930	July 4–6	1st National Conference	"Over 60"	Elects Gitlow Secretary, names Lovestone Editor.
1932	September 3–5	2nd National Conference		Changes name to Communist Party of the USA (Opposition).
1933/4	December 30 – January 1	4th National Conference	53	Lovestone & Zam offer dueling Reports, with Lovestone winning over Zam's call for a new party and International, 45–7.
1934	June 30 – July 1	National Plenum of the CPO	"About 50"	Adopts long statement "The Present Situation and the Tasks of the Communists."
1935	August 31 – September 2	5th Convention	80	
1936	September 5–7	National Conference		
1937	March 27–28	2nd Midwest Conference		
1937	May 29–31	6th National Convention	101	Changes name of group to Independent Communist Labor League
1938	July 2–4	7th National Convention	29	Changes name of group to Independent Labor League of America
1939	September 2–4	8th National Convention		Adopts anti-war resolution
1940	December 28–29	9th National Convention	25	Votes to dissolve organization

== Activities within organized labor ==
=== Auto workers ===
The Lovestoneites' most controversial foray into the union movement was their attempt to help United Auto Workers president Homer Martin end the influence of the official Communists within his union. In the early 1930s there was no national union for automobile workers, but there were several directly affiliated AFL locals in Michigan. The Lovestoneites did have some members within them, organized into the Detroit Progressive Group for One Union. The AFL merged these locals together in 1935 and the UAW held its first convention and elected its first officers at its April 1936 convention. Homer Martin was elected president, Wyndham Mortimer first vice-president, Ed Hall second vice-president, Walter Wells third vice-president and George Addes general-secretary treasurer. From the beginning the top leadership was divided between Martin loyalists and Communist Party members like Mortimer, Hall and Addes. Additionally, there was a faction allied with the Socialist party led by the Reuther brothers that did not have representation at the top but had a following among many locals, which at the moment allied with the official Communists.

In 1937 Mortimer and Bob Travis led a series of successful sit-down strikes, first at General Motors and then at Chrysler, Hudson, Packard and Studebaker. Martin became concerned about the rising power of the Communists within his union and turned to David Dubinsky for advice. Dubinsky and Martin developed a plan, in which they would commission Jay Lovestone to help remove the communist influence in the union. Dubinsky gave Lovestone $100,000 to effect the operation. In April 1937 30 Lovestoneites arrived in Detroit to begin their work. They were led by Alex Bail, under his party name George F. Miles, who was in daily contact with Lovestone in New York. William Munger replaced the Communist leaning Henry Kraus as editor of the UAWs periodical the Auto Worker, he also became Martins speech writer; Eve Stone, Alex Bails wife, took over the UAW's Women's Auxiliary; Irving Brown took over operations in UAW locals in Chicago and Baltimore. Perhaps most significant was Francis Henson, who became Homer Martin new executive secretary.

The Lovestone group was successful at first, purging Communists from the Flint Local, firing 17 communist organizers, but unable to remove the Reuther led Socialists. In the months leading up to the August 1937 convention the UAW became bitterly divided between the Martin-Lovestone "Progressive caucus" and the Communist-Socialist "Unity Group". At the August Convention the Martin-Lovestone group tried to make its move and oust Mortimer, Hall and Addes from the leadership. However, on the fifth day the convention got a surprise visit from CIO president John L. Lewis who endorsed the incumbent leadership. Mortimer, Hall and Addes were re-elected, but two supposedly pro-Martin vice-presidents were added, Richard Frankensteen and R. J. Thomas.

On June 18, 1938 Martin suspended five members of the executive board. They were to be "tried" by the union on charges of conspiracy to destroy the union. The five suspended members were Mortimer, Hall, Welles, Addes and Frankensteen, who had been weaned away from the pro-Martin faction. Six non-suspended board members, led by Victor Reuther walked out in protest at the squabbling.

The trial began on July 25 and lasted until August 6, ending in Frankensteen, Mortimer and Halls expulsion and Wells suspension. Victor Reuther appealed to John L. Lewis to intervene in the fiasco. In the first week of September Lewis sent a CIO commission consisting of Philip Murray and Sidney Hillman to offer Martin an ultimatum: either re-instate the ousted board or be expelled from the Congress of Industrial Organizations. Martin protested this interference in the unions affairs, but eventually caved. The new board had an anti-Martin majority and proceeded to fire the Lovestoneites whom he had put in office.

In 1939 the UAW would split into two groups, Martin leading his group into the AFL. Irving Brown was still with this group trying to organize support among the Baltimore locals, but to little effect. The Martin UAW folded in 1940.

=== Doll and toy workers ===
The Lovestoneites were also a presence in the Doll and Toy Workers Union. "Progressives" Alexander Ravitch and Emanuel Diana were elected secretary-treasurer and president respectively in August 1934, though there were still CP sympathizers on the board. The progressives swept the elections a year later, electing Anthony H. Esposito manager. DTWU would later amalgamate with several other toy and novelty workers unions under CIO auspices. Ravitch became national secretary treasurer of the new organization and Esposito president. In 1952 Esposito would leave the union, now called the Playthings, Jewelry and Novelty Workers' International Union, over a "raiding" dispute. His successor was another Lovestoneite, Alex Bail.

In January 1936, Julius Herskowitz, a Lovestoneite unionist trying to organize a plant that made Mickey Mouse dolls was beaten by an unknown assailant and his skull was fractured. He had received threats from the owner of his factory.

=== Furriers ===
The Lovestoneites were also active in the International Fur & Leather Workers Union. During most of their history in that union they were the major opposition element, first against the Old Guard socialist leadership under Samuel Schorr, and then the Communists under Ben Gold. During all their early campaigning within the American labor movements, the Lovestoneites had pushed for the abolition of the TUUL dual unions, such as the Needle Trades Workers Industrial Union, and for those members to join the already established AFL groups. In 1935 the NTWIU was disbanded and the Lovestoneite group within the IFWU – the Furriers Progressive League—pushed for a resolution urging for the NTWIU members to be allowed into the union and new elections to take place. The Communists won control of the union in that election and Ben Gold, formerly head of the NTWIU, became president.

The Communists acted in a very dictatorial way in running the administration. The Lovestoneites formed a coalition with the socialists, the Furriers Progressive Unity League, to oppose the communists, however Communist control only tightened. Benjamin Baraz, leader of the Lovestoneite caucus lost election as Union business manager. In 1938, yet another united front was set up, the United Progressive Furriers, which included "left and right wing socialists, anarchists, Lovestoneites, left and right Zionists" as well as independent progressives. The coalition appealed to John L. Lewis, head of the CIO, to help them in their struggle against the Ben Gold clique, but to no avail.

In late 1938 Gold began to take measures against the opposition. In December it informed Baraz that he had been found guilty of "malicious slander" against the leadership and had been suspended. In Union elections held in 1939 the opposition were denied poll watchers and several of their candidates were forbidden from running. The Opposition decided to boycott the elections. Finally, in March 1940 the six remaining opposition leaders were ousted from the union. Again, a coalition of socialists, Zionists, Lovestoneites and others tried to rally public opinion for the ousted leaders, but to no effect.

=== Garment workers ===
The Lovestonites had a large following among the largely Yiddish speaking membership of International Ladies' Garment Workers' Union Local 22, with Communist Party (Opposition) member "Sasha" Zimmerman playing a leading role. The organization staunchly supported the ILGWU in its various organizing and strike efforts. In April 1932 Zimmerman ran for manager of Dressmakers Local 22 as part of an organized "Progressive League" ticket.

The Lovestoneites briefly won control of ILGWU Local 155, the Knitgoods Workers Local, in April 1934 under Louis Nelson. While in power they established an educational department, sick and relief fund, and union hiring hall. But it was their policy during the mid-1930s to try to bring the official communists into the mainstream union movement, giving them a place on their ticket.

=== Hotel and restaurant workers ===
The Lovestoneites were active in two New York area locals of the AFL Hotel and Restaurant Workers International. Within Waiters Local 16, they organized the Progressive Culinary League, to oppose Communist and Mafia domination of the union. In 1940 the Progressives won control of the local, but the ILLA dissolved later that year. They also organized the United Progressive Group as an opposition to the Communist administration of Cafeteria Workers Local 302 but were never able to win its leadership.

=== Mine workers ===
During the early part of its history the Lovestoneites had a following among United Mine Workers members in the anthracite region of eastern Pennsylvania. Frank Vrataric was the leader of this "progressive" faction that led the fight against John L. Lewis' purge of Communists at the January 1932 convention. In May of that year Vrataric and other opposition leaders were expelled from the UMW. In September the dissident elements, not all Lovestoneites, met in convention and constituted themselves the Progressive Group within the UMW and resolved to try to get reinstated in the official organization. The opposition coalition did not last however, as the other leaders called for the creation of a new union in August 1933 and other disaffected members gravitated towards the Progressive Miners of America. The Lovestoneites strongly opposed these moves, on the grounds that they constituted dual unionism.

=== Office workers ===
The Lovestoneites organized among New York area white collar workers. In Local 12644, a directly affiliated AFL local in New York, the Lovestoneites led the Progressive faction, which competed for control with the official Communists and the "conservatives". The Progressive ticket won control of the groups executive board in a landslide in 1935. However, when the local affiliated with the CIO United Office and Professional Workers of America, the UOPWA leadership became dominated by official Communists. In October 1938 Anne Gould, editor of the Progressive Office Worker was suspended by the leadership. She took 500 members of UOPWA Local 16 out and joined the AFLs Bookkeepers, Stenographers and Accountants Union. The office workers involved were principally employees of ILGWU, the Workmen's Circle, the League for Industrial Democracy, Union Health Center, Labor Committee for Palestine, the Non-Sectarian Anti-Nazi League, and the Workmens Sick and Death Benefit Fund.

=== Painters ===
The Lovestoneite "progressive" slate won control of District Council 18, Brooklyn, of the Brotherhood of Painters and Decorators in February 1936. In this instance the Communist-led Rank & File group withdrew their candidate so that Sam Freedman would stand against the supposedly Mafia-backed Bob Kellman. That March the Lovestoneites, the official Communists and the Socialist Militants backed Louis Weinstock in his successful bid to win the leadership of District 9, Manhattan, against a candidate backed by the Old Guard, The Forward and the Philip Zausner leadership.

=== Shoe workers ===
In 1934 several unions in the shoe workers field merged to form the United Shoe and Leather Workers Union. In March 1935 Lovestoneite Israel Zimmerman, the brother of Charles Zimmerman, was elected as head of the union and another "progressive" was elected treasurer. While in control of the union they faced considerable opposition from the Communist ex-TUUL faction, who tried to have the entire executive board recalled at the group's October 1934 convention. By March 1937, however, Zimmerman lost control of the organization and it voted to merge with Shoe Workers Protective Union and the Brotherhood of Shoe and Allied Craftsmen to form the United Shoe Workers of America under CIO auspices.

=== Teachers ===
The Lovestoneites had a small following within the New York City Teachers Union (TU), Local 5 of the American Federation of Teachers. The union was still dominated by its two founders, Henry Linville and Abraham Lefkowitz and by its leadership was aligned with the Old Guard Socialists. The Lovestoneites organized their own faction within the Teachers Union, called the "Progressive Group," and working in coalition with the Communist-led "Rank and File" faction succeeded in ousting the union leadership in 1935. The ousted union leaders subsequently bolted to establish a new union called the Teachers Guild. The Communists soon solidified their control over the TU, while Lovestoneites found themselves in another opposition coalition called the "Independents." Shortly before the dissolution of the ILLA, the Progressive group left the Teachers Union and obtained a separate charter from the American Federation of Teachers. The TU itself would have its charter revoked the following year.

=== Textile workers ===
The Lovestoneites had limited influence within the American Federation of Silk Workers, an autonomous affiliate of the United Textile Workers of America. Lovestoneite Eli Keller was manager of the AFSW local in Paterson, New Jersey until 1935 when he resigned because of "irresponsible" behavior on the part of the executive committee. The Communists allied with conservative elements to prevent Keller from running to retake control of the union in the next election. Despite a "conservative" victory in the union election of 1935, the Communists ex-TUUL members effectively gained control of the union and led a disastrous strike in late 1935. Shortly thereafter the UTW leadership revoked the Paterson locals charter and reorganized the local. The Lovestoneites decided not to enter the new group.

Later, when the CIO Textile Workers Organizing Committee was formed, two Lovestoneites, Meyer Laks and Meyer Chanatzky were on the executive board of the new Paterson local. Again, the Lovestoneites ran into trouble with the official Communists who suspend Laks and Chanatzky in late 1938. Rank and file pressure was able to re-instate them.

== Prominent members ==
- Alex Bail ("George F. Miles")
- J. O. Bentall
- Irving Brown
- Louis Corey
- Harry Goldberg ("Jim Cork")
- Ben Davidson ("D. Benjamin")
- Will Herberg
- Benjamin Gitlow
- Kalmen Kaplansky
- William Kruse
- Benjamin Lifshitz
- Jay Lovestone
- Jack MacDonald
- Tom Myerscough
- Benjamin Mandel ("Bert Miller")
- William Moriarty
- Louis Nelson
- Jack Rubenstein
- Maida Springer
- Edward Welsh
- Harry Winitsky
- Bertram D. Wolfe
- Ella Wolfe ("Janet Cork")
- Herbert Zam
- Charles S. Zimmerman
- Israel Zimmerman

== Pamphlets ==
- Appeal to the Comintern. [New York]: [CPUSA Delegates to the American Commission], July 1929. —Four page broadsheet newspaper, later sold for 5 cents as a party document.
- The Crisis in the Communist Party, USA: Statement of Principles of the Communist Party (Majority Group). New York: The Revolutionary Age, Feb. 1930.
- Will Herberg: The Heritage of the Civil War. New York: Workers Age Publishing Association, n.d. [1932].
- Benjamin Gitlow: Some Plain Words on Communist Unity. New York: Workers Age Publishing Association, n.d. [June 1932].
- Jay Lovestone: The American Labor Movement: Its Past, Its Present, Its Future. New York: Workers Age Publishing Association, n.d. [June 1932].
- M.N. Roy: "I Accuse!" : From the Suppressed Statement of Manabendra Nath Roy on Trial for Treason before Sessions Court, Cawnpore, India New York: Roy Defense Committee of India, 1932.
- A United Labor Front against Fascism!: Manifesto of the Communist Opposition. New York: Workers Age Publishing Association, March 1933.
- Bertram D. Wolfe: What is the Communist Opposition? New York: Workers Age Publishing Association, [January] 1933.
- Leo: German Fascism and the Workers. New York: Workers Age Publishing Association, [May] 1933.
- Will Herberg: The NRA and American Labor. New York: Workers Age Publishing Association, September 1933.
- Where We Stand: Volume 1: Platform and Programmatic Documents of the International Communist Opposition New York: Communist Party (Opposition), 1934.
- For Unity of the World Communist Movement: A Letter to the Independent Labour Party of Great Britain from the Communist Party USA (Opposition). New York: Communist Party (Opposition), n.d. [c. 1934].
- Furriers Faction of the CP(O), "Fur Workers: Condemn a Shameful Provocation!" New York: Furriers Faction of the Communist Party (Opposition), n.d. [March 1934]. —English/Yiddish leaflet.
- Jay Lovestone: What Next for American Labor? New York: Communist Party of the USA (Opposition), May 1934.
- Bertram D. Wolfe: Things We Want to Know. New York: Workers Age Publishing Association, June 1934.
- Why a Labor Party? New York: Communist Party (Opposition), December 1934.
- Where We Stand: Volume 4: Programmatic Documents of the Communist Party (Opposition). New York: Communist Party (Opposition), n.d. [c. January 1935].
- Jay Lovestone:Soviet Foreign Policy and the World Revolution. New York: Workers Age Publishing Association, August 1935.
- The 1936 Election Campaign and the position of the Communist Party USA (Opposition): A Statement. New York: Workers Age Publishing Association, 1936.
- Will Herberg: The CIO: Labor's New Challenge. New York: Workers Age Publishing Association, February 1937.
- Jay Lovestone: People's Front Illusion — From "Social Fascism" to "People's Front." New York: Workers Age Publishers, n.d. [1937].
- Lambda: The Truth About the Barcelona Events. New York: Workers Age Publishers, n.d. [1937].
- Which Road Shall the ASU Take? New York: Student Section of the Independent Communist Labor League, November 1937.
- Bertram D. Wolfe: Civil War in Spain. Introduction by Will Herberg. New York: Workers Age Publishers, December 1937.
- Safeguard Your Unions Against Disruption!: An Appeal to All Trade Unionists. New York City: Independent Communist Labor League, n.d. [c. 1938].
- American CP Writes Its Own Epitaph: Earl Browder's New Constitution. New York City: Independent Communist Labor League, [1938]
- Where We Stand, Labor's Road Forward: The Program and Policies of the ILLA. Second Printing. New York: Workers Age Publishers, July 1938.
- Keep America Out of War: Unite for Peace, Freedom, and Socialism. New York: Workers Age Publishers, September 1939.
- Rosa Luxemburg: The Russian Revolution. Introduction and translation by Bertram D. Wolfe. New York: Workers Age Publishers, April 1940.
- Jay Lovestone:New Frontiers for Labor. New York: Workers Age Publishers, n.d. [c. 1940].

=== New Workers School ===
- Bertram D. Wolfe, Economics of Present Day Capitalism. New York: New Workers School, n.d. [1930s].
- Bertram D. Wolfe, The Nature of Capitalist Crisis. New York: New Workers School, n.d. [1930s].
- Will Herberg, Marxism and Political Thought. New York: New Workers School, n.d. [1930s].
- Will Herberg, Which Program for Revolutionists? New York: New Workers School, n.d. [1930s].
- Will Herberg, American Revolutionary Traditions. New York: New Workers School, n.d. [1932].
- Herbert Zam, History of Russian Revolution. New York: New Workers School, n.d. [1932].
- Will Herberg, Dialectical Materialism. New York: New Workers School, n.d. [1933].
- Will Herberg, Historical Materialism. New York: New Workers School, n.d. [1933].
- August Thalheimer, On Dialectics. New York: New Workers School, [January 1934]. —mimeographed
- Will Herberg, Theoretical System of Leninism. New York: New Workers School, n.d. [1934].
- A Short Explanation of the Murals of Diego Rivera: "Portrait of America" (A series of 21 murals). New York: New Workers School, n.d. [1934].
- Jay Lovestone, Marxian Classics in the Light of Current History. New York City, New Workers School, 1934.
- Bertram D. Wolfe, Marxian Economics: An Outline of Twelve Lectures. New York: New Workers School, 1934
- Will Herberg, Outline for the Study of Dialectical Materialism and the Life of Man. New York: New Workers School, n.d. [1935].
- Will Herberg, Foundations of Marxism: Study Outline. New York: New Workers School, n.d. [1936].
- Will Herberg, Marxism and Modern Political Thought. New York: New Workers School, n.d. [1936].
- Outline on Marxism and American Historical Traditions. [New York?] : Summer Labor Institute of the New Workers School, n.d. [1936].
- A. R., Outline on Trade Unionism: Theory and Practice. New York: New Workers School, n.d. [1937].

=== Party documents ===
- Constitution of the Independent Labor League of America, Adopted by the 7th National Convention, July 1938.

== See also ==
- Rand School of Social Science (1906)
- Work People's College (1907)
- Brookwood Labor College (1921)
- New York Workers School (1923):
  - New Workers School (1929)
  - Jefferson School of Social Science (1944)
- Highlander Research and Education Center (formerly Highlander Folk School) (1932)
  - Commonwealth College (Arkansas) (1923–1940)
  - Southern Appalachian Labor School (since 1977)
- San Francisco Workers' School (1934)
  - California Labor School (formerly Tom Mooney Labor School) (1942)
- Continuing education
