= Gitlowites =

The Workers Communist League or Gitlowites were a Right Opposition Communist group that split from the main group of the American Right Opposition, the Communist Party of the USA (Opposition) in 1933. It was the only split from that organization that created a new group.

== Origins ==
The origin of the group goes back to a resolution Benjamin Gitlow submitted to the Second National Conference of the Lovestone group, held September 2–3, 1932. He wished that the group would adopt a new resolution on the general line of the Communist Party of the Soviet Union. While endorsing the first five-year plan, and defending the Soviet Union as a whole, the resolution criticized "factional" use of the plan for the benefit of the Stalin leadership in the USSR and the Comintern, as well as the mistakes with regard to the collectivization of agriculture and the creation of light industry. While the conference re-adopted its previous spring 1931 resolution on the issue, it opened up the pages of its organ, Workers Age, to debate on the issue and asked its members to contribute their opinions beginning with the November 15 issue.

Editorials supporting the old resolution were submitted by Jay Lovestone, Will Herberg, Herbert Zam and others, while an article against the current resolution by Lazar Becker was broken up and published over three issues. Portions of Gitlow's own contribution, "The Russian Question critically considered" were published in two issues, but not the conclusion. The majority argued that the general line of the CPSU was correct, and the opposition was offering "constructive criticism" of the Stalin leadership's "mistakes" in its application domestically within the Soviet Union and with regards to the relationship between the CPSU and the other parties in the Comintern. Furthermore, the "Russian question" was not a defining issue for the group. Gitlow and Becker argued that a correct understanding of the "Russian question" was of decisive importance to the group and the position taken on it determined whether the group had a justification for being. Gitlow argued that though the CPSU's official line as determined by the 15th congress was correct, the Stalin leadership had veered so far away from it that the Party's general line was no longer correct and was going in the direction of Trotskyism.

After the National Bureau of the group upheld its support for the current position on the Russian question at a New York mass meeting on February 2, 1933 Gitlow resigned. At the next plenum of the Communist Party (Opposition)'s National Committee, February 11–13, Becker presented an appeal with the signatures of 13 members which criticized the Lovestone leadership on the "Russian question" and on a number of other issues related to the groups work within the labor movement and relationship to the official Communist Party. The appeal was rejected unanimously by the National Committee.

== Activism ==
After leaving the Lovestoneites, Gitlow tried to form a "bloc" of the opposition Communist movements against Stalinism. To that end he addressed a letter on April 4 to the Lovestonites, the Trotskyist Communist League of America and Albert Weisbord's Communist League of Struggle outlining his plans for a conference to unite the Communist Opposition groups with the ultimate aim of reconstituting the Communist Party USA on a non-Stalinist basis. He was rebuffed by Weisbord's group, who would only unite with him on the basis of the program of the Left Opposition, but got a more sympathetic hearing from the Trotskyists. In September he attended a conference sponsored by the League for Independent Political Action that was attempting to build a movement for a Farmer–Labor Party, but nothing came of it.

Gitlow had more luck with the Trotskyist Communist League of America. Unity negotiations with them began in October 1933. While formal unity stalled over questions related to the Fourth International, "socialism in one country" and the labor party, the two organizations worked together within the Amalgamated Hotel and Restaurant Workers Union, a division of the Amalgamated Food Workers where each had a small following. Negotiations eventually stopped in November as both groups concentrated on building the AFW, preparing for a general strike. After a strike was canceled shortly before New Year's Eve, a new strike was called in late January after a union member was dismissed from the Waldorf-Astoria Hotel. The Amalgamated, under joint CLA-Gitlowite leadership, led a general strike of at least 4,000 workers in some of New York's most famous hotels, including the Astor, Biltmore and Commodore. On February 15 the case went to the NRA Regional Labor Board and the union was able to get an agreement with the owners that the strikebreakers would be dismissed, the workers could return to their jobs under joint union-management auspices and that the RLB would hold hearings on the conditions in the hotels. While these conditions were violated by the hotel management, the secretary of the union, CLA member B.J. Field considered it a victory and put emphasis on negotiating with the hotels rather than continued pickets. For this, and for alleged clique rule and attempts to curry favor with "bourgeoisie public opinion" Field and his associate in the union leadership, Aristodimos Kaldis, were expelled from the Communist League of America on February 18.

Field and his coterie fused with the Workers Communist League to form a new group in April 1934, Organization Committee for a Revolutionary Workers Party, despite having had differences with each other while working within the AFW.

== Within the Socialist Party ==
On June 1 the tumultuous 18th national convention of the Socialist Party opened in Detroit. Gitlow and some others from the organization committee came as observers. Here he came in contact with leaders of the Militants and the Revolutionary Policy Committee. While dismissing the RPC as too factional, he was impressed by the Militants. On August 23 the Gitlow group within the Organization Committee for a Revolutionary Party announced their intention to join the Socialists. This was not approved by B.J. Field and his adherents, which kept control of the group's paper, Labor Front. The Gitlowites apparently carried on for a few months under the name of the Organization Committee while attempting to enter the Socialists, and issued leaflets under that name.

On October 29 Gitlow held a conference with "several founders and former leaders of the Communist party" including delegates from Indiana, Illinois, Ohio, Pennsylvania, New York and New Jersey. The group adopted a platform noting that lack of unity between socialists and communists had helped Hitler come to power and endorsing the 1934 Statement of Principles that the Socialist Party had adopted at its convention in June as a step toward "revolutionary development". The group made an application to join the Socialist Party but they were rebuffed by the Socialist Party of New York. The leadership of the SPNY was a stronghold of the moderate Old Guard faction and disapproved of the revolutionaries. State chairman Louis Waldman saw it as an attempt by the Militants to weaken the Old Guard in the state, especially after Norman Thomas endorsed letting them into the party. After the state executive committee passed a resolution strictly prohibiting any local from allowing a communist or quasi-communist from joining, Gitlow joined the New Jersey state organization.

One inside the Socialist Party, however, Gitlow started to have doubts about the Militants. The general pro-communist tone of the Militants upset him, especially after they started co-operating with the Communists organizationally during the popular front period. He was dismayed by the merger of the Student League for Industrial Democracy into the American Student Union, and the entry of the CP-affiliated Unemployed Councils into the Workers Alliance of America for fear the new organizations would be controlled by the Communist Party. Instead of leading another split he decided to drop out altogether. Lazar Becker would stay with the party until at least its 1940 convention, when he led the opposition to Norman Thomas' pacifist stance on World War II.

== Publications ==
The organization published a newspaper Voice of Labor from Vol. I #1 June 1933 to Vol. II #4 April 1934.

- Is the Stalin general line correct? The appeal to the Plenum of the Communist Party of the USA (Opposition) New York, N.Y : Workers Communist League, 1933
