= Ben Davidson (politician) =

American politician (1901–1991)

- Born: 1901; Pittsburgh, Pennsylvania, U.S.
- Died: December 1991 (aged 89–90); Los Angeles, California, U.S.
- Other name: David Benjamin (CPUSA)
- Education: Columbia University
- Occupations: politician, educator
- Years active: 1925–1977
- Employer: Liberal Party of New York (1944–1977)
- Political party: Liberal Party of New York, Communist Party (Opposition)
- Spouse: Eve Chambers Davidson
- Children: 2

Ben Davidson (1901–1991) was an American politician who co-founded the Liberal Party of New York State with fellow teacher unionist George Counts, David Dubinsky of the International Ladies Garment Workers Union, Alex Rose of the Cloth Hat, Cap and Millinery Workers, and theologian Reinhold Niebuhr.

== Biography ==
=== Background ===
Ben Davidson was born in Pittsburgh in 1901. He began his undergraduate studies at the University of Pittsburgh and finished them at Columbia University.

=== Teaching and Anti-Stalinist Communism ===
"After college he taught social studies in schools in Manhattan," wrote The New York Times in his obituary. Whittaker Chambers recalled further details in his memoir. Among the first people he met when he joined the Communist front Workers Party of America in 1925 were Davidson and his wife. He wrote:

Eve Chambers and her husband have long been out of the Communist Party. They were expelled as "incurable right-wing deviationists and Lovestoneites" when the Stalinists took over the party in 1929. Today, David Benjamin is better known by his real name, Ben Davidson, and as an active lieutenant of the chief of the Liberal Party in New York—Adolf A. Berle, with whom, fourteen years later, when Berle was security officer of the State Department, I was to have a momentous conversation about Communist espionage. This group of Communists was called the English-speaking branch.

Davidson, he recalled, advised him against using his real name in the Party.

By 1923, he was a member of the New York City Teachers Union, Local Union 5 AFT. There, Benjamin Mandel created a "Special Research Group," affiliated with the Educational Workers International, itself recently created by the Red International of Labor Unions, which in turn was affiliated with the Soviet-dominated Comintern. Pressure from Communist members led to a majority of Local 5 to reject this chain of affiliation. Communist members of Local 5 included Mandel, Davidson, Bertram Wolfe, Jacob Lind, Rae Ragozin, Jack Hardy, Sarah Golden, Clara Reibert, Abraham Zitron, and Isadore Begun.

In 1929, Wolfe and Davidson formed the "Progressive Group" among teachers. In 1934, when Davidson and others filed a minority board report that criticized a pro-Communist "Classroom Teachers Group" (CTG), the board ruled them out of order. He then helped form a "United Committee to Save the Union" in opposition to CTG control. They also formed a similar "Program Committee."

Also in 1929, Mandel and Davidson formed the Communist Party (Opposition).

In 1935, Davidson left the Teachers Union and became a founding organizer of the Teachers' Guild. He appeared before the Rapp-Coudert Committee on November 28, 1940.

=== Liberal Party of New York ===
In 1944, Davidson formed the Liberal Party of New York State with George Counts, David Dubinsky of the International Ladies' Garment Workers' Union, Alex Rose of the United Hatters, Cap and Millinery Workers International Union, and theologian Reinhold Niebuhr. Many had done so to break away from the American Labor Party. From its start, the Liberal Party was anti-communist. It was Davidson who motioned for the party's creation and name. Other leaders have included: John L. Childs, Adolf A. Berle, Jr., Dr. Timothy W. Costello, Dr. Donald Szantho Harrington, and James S. Notaro.

In 1946, he partook in a newspaper debate, "Does American Need A Third Party?" in which he said:

America needs a third party. Both the Democratic and Republican parties have repeatedly demonstrated their incapacity to solve the major problems of American life. Both have held political power; yet, under both, large sections of our population have lacked the food, clothing, housing, medical care, and economic security people need and this country can provide. The fundamental cleavages within the two old major parties prevent their effectuating positive programs for achieving full employment, high production levels, and improved living standards. In the Democratic Party, Senators Wagner and Bilbo are diametrically opposed in outlook and action, and similarly with Morse and Bricker in the Republican Party. The spread of totalitarianism, the danger of a third and atomic war, the virus of religion and racial bigotry and persecution require a political instrument that will enable the people to meet these challenges… These times demand that liberals in all walks of life unite in a new, nation-wide third party that will challenge the unholy alliance of Reactionary Republicans and Southern Tory Democrats now dominating the Congress.

Davidson was a frequent Liberal spokesperson. Typical issues included speeding laws and foreign policy. Special social issues included housing, welfare, racial equality and civil liberties. For example, in 1947, when the Metropolitan Life Insurance Company for barring United Nations personnel from Peter Copper Village due to their race and color. Davidson called upon Governor Dewey and the New York legislature to oppose such actions as running counter to public policy. "The Liberal Party will do everything within its power, through education and legislation, to make feasible for persons, no mater of what color, race, religion, or creed, to be eligible to live in any housing project with benefits from tax exemption."

He remained prominent as the Liberal Party's executive director, as cited in newspapers in 1955 and 1957, when he was quoted as saying "Our own program thinks well" of the Wagner administration.

The Liberal Party was important in New York from the 1940s through the 1960s, thanks to electoral fusion in the State of New York. The last and most successful power play of the Liberal Party occurred in 1969 when incumbent Republican mayor John V. Lindsay, who lost the Republican primary, joined the Liberal Party and achieved reelection as a Liberal candidate. Davidson served as full-time director of the party throughout this period, retiring in 1977 after 33 years of service. James S. Notaro was a subsequent executive director.

=== Death ===
At the time of his death, Davidson lived in Beverly Hills, California. He died of complications from myasthenia gravis, aged 90, at the Guardian Rehabilitation Hospital in Los Angeles.

== Personal life ==
Davidson married Eve Chambers (Communist Party name "Eve Dorf") in the 1920s. They had two children, Karla Davidson Feitelberg and John Davidson.

Eve Chambers Davidson died in Los Angeles on May 8, 2009, aged 108.

== See also ==
- American Federation of Teachers
- Benjamin Mandel
- Bertram Wolfe
- Whittaker Chambers
- Jack Hardy
- Lovestoneites
- Communist Party (Opposition)
- CPUSA
- Teachers Guild
- Liberal Party of New York
- George Counts
- David Dubinsky
- Alex Rose
- Reinhold Niebuhr

== External sources ==
- "Liberal Party of New York State, Records" (PDF). New York Public Library.
- Civil Rights Digital Library: Letter, 1955 Nov. 29, (New York, N.Y.), George S. Counts, Ben Davidson, to Joseph A. DeLaine, Sr. (New York, N.Y.)
- University of South Carolina: Letter, 1955 Nov. 29, (New York, N.Y.), George S. Counts, Ben Davidson, to Joseph A. De Laine, Sr. (New York, N.Y.)
- Columbia University: Letter to Davidson from U.S. Senator Richard L. Neuberger dated May 10, 1956 (PDF)
