= Ben Davidson (disambiguation) =

Ben Davidson (1940–2012) was an American football player.

Ben Davidson may also refer to:

- Ben Davidson (rugby league) (1902–1961), New Zealand rugby league player
- Ben Davidson (politician) (1901–1991), American politician
- Ben Davidson (One Life to Live), a fictional character on the American soap opera One Life to Live

== See also ==
- Ben Davison (born 1996), American rower
