= Bill Sullivan (artist) =

American painter (1942–2010)

William R. Sullivan (September 10, 1942 – October 22, 2010) was an American painter, printmaker and publisher.

Bill Sullivan by Robert Gordon, 1968

== Background ==
Sullivan was born in New Haven, Connecticut, and died in Hudson, New York. He attended Silvermine College and earned an M.F.A. from The University of Pennsylvania, where he studied with Fairfield Porter, Neil Welliver, Jane Freilicher, John Button and Rudy Burckhardt. He also studied privately with Josef and Annie Albers.

== Life ==
In 1957, when he was 15 years old, Sullivan was spending a summer washing dishes in Lenox, Massachusetts, and met Claes Oldenburg, who was there working at a resort and running a small gallery in a barn. Oldenburg's early paintings became an inspiration for Sullivan. That fall he followed Oldenburg and his wife back to New York City, where he slept on Oldenburg's couch and camped out in Central Park. He worked as a night dishwasher at Café Figaro which, along with the San Remo Bar across the street, was a place where writers and artists congregated. Oldenburg included Sullivan's work in group shows at Judson Gallery, which he was running. Besides Oldenburg the show included Jim Dine and Red Grooms, who were unknown artists at the time.

Bill Sullivan, New York, New York, 48 x 48 inches, Oil on Canvas, 1992

In the late 1960s, Sullivan joined Bowery Gallery, an artist-run gallery in a storefront on Bowery that was dedicated mostly to figurative art, where he was one of the first artists to show. Later, when the Alliance of Figurative Artists was starting, Sullivan organized weekly panels and discussions at The Educational Alliance. He organized these panels on a regular basis for several years.

Sullivan's first solo show at Bowery Gallery in 1970 included paintings depicting people, New York cityscapes and still lifes. After this show, Sullivan developed an interest in landscape painting. The city of New York became one of his favorite subjects. New York City, the Hudson River and Manhattan's West Side highway became his main subjects. He had several shows of these paintings at Bowery Gallery and continued to paint the Hudson till the end of his life. At one of these shows he met art collector G. W. Einstein, who became his friend and represented him for many years. Sullivan had his first solo show at G. W. Einstein Company in 1978.

In 1977, Sullivan met the Colombian writer Jaime Manrique at Julius—a historic gay bar in Greenwich Village—and shortly after began a romantic relationship that lasted until the artist's death in 2010. They travelled to Colombia, where Bill wanted to paint the places that Frederick Edwin Church and Martin Johnson Heade had painted in the 1850s. In Colombia he had a solo show in the Bogotá Museum of Modern Art in 1978. Two years later, Sullivan returned to New York. In 1983 Sullivan travelled to Ecuador to paint the volcanoes that Frederick Church had painted. The years following his return from Ecuador were the period when Sullivan's work was most in display in New York City. Reviewing "World is Round," a group show at the Hudson River Museum, Vivien Raynor wrote in the New York Times: " Although he believes that panorama in Western art came out of a 'need to paint battles,' Bill Sullivan himself offers a view of the Palisades at sunset, which is no less engaging for being a plain old école de Hudson school landscape."

In the 1990s Sullivan devoted himself to painting the landscape of New York City, in particular the skyscrapers of Midtown Manhattan, and iconic interior spaces such as Grand Central Station. In the exhibit "Paints, Props and Process" organized by Margaret Mathews-Berenson at the college of New Rochelle, which included paintings depicting Broadway theaters Sullivan showed "Moon Over St. James." Reviewing the exhibit in the New York Times, William Zimmer wrote: "Appealing in a cozy level is the painting 'Moon Over St. James' by Bill Sullivan in which a full moon and a row of theaters with their marquees lighted have a kind of equal divinity."

Sullivan remained in New York City until 2001 where he had several solo shows. In 2002, he settled in Hudson, New York, where his two nineteenth-century heroes, Frederick Church and Sanford Robinson Gifford, had lived. He painted many of the sites Church and Gifford rendered on canvas. In 2006, The Albany Institute of History and Art had a major retrospective of Sullivan's work.

== Reception ==
About his work, John Ashbery said:

"With only a tinge of irony, Bill Sullivan makes new the vast spaces and swooning optimism of nineteenth-century Luminist painting. Reaffirming the contemplation of nature as its own reward, he also sets new tasks for painting and undertakes them with compelling eagerness. While there has been a tendency among some contemporary artists to present a revisionist view of the 'great outdoors' of nineteenth-century landscape painters, Sullivan has no satirical agenda. After spending several years in South America amid the landscapes that attracted Frederic Edwin Church and Martin Heade, among others, he refined and strengthened this awesome imagery after returning to New York. A certain surreality floats through these vaporous visions of Colombia, though this may just be the result of Sullivan's careful documentation of scenes that looked unreal to begin with."

The Cuban writer Reinaldo Arenas wrote:

"Bill Sullivan's paintings are the work of an artist expressing himself at the peak of his power. He paints with a masterly craft and has a talent for deciphering the meaning of nature. His landscapes of known and unknown worlds reveal realities new to us. His work is an exaltation, a desolate yet fully realized splendor, which he renders with the serenity and wisdom of someone for whom light and color are familiar instruments used to create mystery. His roots and concerns take him from a dreamy, organic, and telluric world toward limitless horizons where the real and the magical (intelligence and imagination) merge in perfect balance. We salute Sullivan, an excellent painter whose fervor deserves our gratitude."

Reviewing "Bill Sullivan at Uptown" for Art in America in December 1996, Eileen Myles wrote:

"Sullivan is a cloud man, and his use of what singer Tom Verlaine called ‘my floating friends’ makes these paintings move…The artificiality of the moment is thrilling. It seems that the more intangible, elusive and ambiguous the spectacle, the more this painter likes it. It's a rave."

Reviewing Bill Sullivan retrospective at The Albany Institute of History and Art, Alfred Corn wrote in Art in America in 2007:

"Comparing these paintings with each other (or with the actual scenes), you see that Sullivan is willing to alter scale and detail so as to make a more coherent picture; realism has to make concessions to design and expression. But that has always been the way of artists of the first rank."

Reviewing the 2012 show "Highlights from the Albany Institute of History and Art" at The Florence Griswold Museum, Martha Schwendener wrote in The New York Times (Connecticut edition):

"Bill Sullivan's "Twilight at Olana" (1990), refers to the Persian-inspired mansion on the Hudson built by Church, who grew rich from his paintings. In Mr. Sullivan's canvases, however, Church's 19th-century sunsets and sunrises become acidic and psychedelic (or, perhaps more befitting our era, chemical)."

About his own work, Bill Sullivan said:

"My ambition as an artist has been to take the painting of the New York School Realists of the generation before me to places it has never gone before. In the Hudson River School, I found an ambition and love of nature that I was able to translate into a vision that is my own."

== Awards ==
- 2005 Furthermore, Foundation (J. M. Kaplan Fund)
- 1989 National Endowment for the Arts Fellowship
- 1981 Ingram Merrill Fellowship, New York

== Exhibitions ==
- 2019 "Great Estates" Paintings of Bill Sullivan and Joseph E. Richards. Carrie Haddad Gallery, Hudson, NY
- 2018 Retrospective of Small Works, The Starr Library, Rhinebeck, NY
- 2011 Bill Sullivan: A Landscape Artist Remembered, Albany Institute of History & Art, Albany, NY
- 2010 Paintbox Leaves: Autumnal Inspiration from Cole to Wyeth, Hudson River Museum, Yonkers, NY
- 2009 Carrie Haddad Gallery, Hudson, NY
- 2008 BCB Gallery, Hudson, NY
- 2007 BCB Gallery, Hudson, NY
- 2006 "The Autobiography of Bill Sullivan: A Landscape Retrospective", The Albany Institute of History and Art, Albany, NY
- 2005 Roxbury Art Group, Roxbury, NY
- 2003 "Paintings of South America" Curated by John Ashbery, The Gallery at The St. Charles, Hudson, NY
- 2001 HHA Gallery, Riverdale, New York
- 1999 Silas-Kenyon Gallery, Provincetown, MA
- 1996 Uptown Gallery, New York City
- 1990 Susan Schreiber Gallery, New York City
- 1990 Tatistcheff Gallery, Santa Monica, California
- 1989 G.W. Einstein Company, Inc., New York City
- 1986 Schreiber/Cutler, Inc., New York City
- 1986 G.W. Einstein Company, Inc., New York City
- 1984 David Findlay Jr., New York City
- 1981 Ruth Siegel Ltd., New York City
- 1980 G.W. Einstein Company, Inc., New York City
- 1979 Galeria Condor, Barranquilla, Colombia
- 1979 Galeria Finale, Medellin, Colombia
- 1978 G.W. Einstein Company, New York City
- 1978 Museo de Arte Moderno, Bogota, Colombia
- 1978 Capricorn Gallery, Washington, D.C.
- 1976 Bowery Gallery, New York City
- 1975 Webber Gallery, Portland, ME
- 1974 Bowery Gallery, New York City
- 1972 Bowery Gallery, New York City
- 1970 Bowery Gallery, New York City
- 1967 East End Gallery, Provincetown, MA
- 1965 John Slade Eli House, New Haven, CT
- 1964 The New Haven Library, CT

== Painted Leaf Press ==
In 1995, Sullivan started a literary press devoted mainly to publishing New York School poets. Some of his books were reviewed in major publications and received awards like The Lambda Literary Award for poetry. Due to illness he stopped publishing in 2001. Among the books published by Painted Leaf Press:

- Sor Juana's Love Poems (1997); by Sor Juana Inés de la Cruz; Translations by Joan Larkin and Jaime Manrique.
- Cold River (1997); by Joan Larkin (Lambda Book Award winner)
- In Thrall (1982); by Jane Delynn
- My night with Federico García Lorca (1997); by Jaime Manrique (Lambda Book Award finalist)
- A Flame for the Touch That Matters (1998); by Michael Lassell (Lambda Book Award finalist)
- Blood & Tears (1999); poems about Mathew Shepherd edited by Scott Gibson. Among the contributors are John Ashbery, Emanuel Xavier, Mark Bibbins, Rafael Campo, Marilyn Hacker, Rachel Hadas, Gerrit Henry, Anselm Hollo, Patricia Spears Jones, Bernadette Mayer, W.S. Merwin, Eileen Myles, Eugene Richie, Paul Schmidt, David Trinidad, Jean Valentine, Anne Waldman and Rosanne Wasserman.
- October for Idas (1997); by Star Black
- Christ Like (1999); by Emanuel Xavier (Lambda Literary Award finalist)
- The Villagers (2000); by Edward Field
- The Traveling Woman (2000); by Roberta Allen

== Collections ==
Sullivan's work is part of numerous public collections, including The Albany Institute of History and Art, the Cleveland Museum of Art, the Hudson River Museum, the Metropolitan Museum of Art, the Museum of the City of New York, the New York Public Library, the Museum of Antioquia, the Bogotá Museum of Modern Art, and Museo de Artes Gráficas de Maracaibo.
