= Fieldites =

American communist sect

The Fieldites were a small leftist sect that split from the Communist League of America in 1934 and known officially as the Organization Committee for a Revolutionary Workers Party and then the League for a Revolutionary Workers Party. The name comes from the name of its leader B. J. Field.

== History ==
Born Max Gould in 1903, B. J. Field had been a successful Columbia educated petroleum analyst on Wall Street before the crash of 1929. Afterwards he became a Trotskyist and led informal discussion groups at his home with the other members.

Field was expelled following the New York Hotel strike of January 1934 for not accepting CLA discipline and not getting adequate safeguards for former strikers against discrimination. Field was later removed from leadership of the Amalgamated Food Workers union because a rival union, the Communist-led Food Workers Industrial Union, had gained shop floor leadership during the course of the unsuccessful strike. By the end of 1934, the Amalgamated Food Workers had merged into the Food Workers Industrial Union. In his book on the history of American Trotskyism, James P. Cannon – at the time a major leader of the CLA – provides a detailed account of Field's antecedents and his part in the hotel strike.

As noted by Cannon, in the late 1920s some CLA members happened to be involved in the Amalgamated Food Workers union which had been reduced in power and influence after the Communist Party split the union in 1930. In 1932, the CLA regarded the sudden upsurge in unionism among the hard-pressed hotel workers as its big chance, throwing much of its resources and membership into this struggle – among them B.J. Field. A statistician, economist and linguist, Field had no previous trade union experience, but his fluent knowledge of French was of crucial importance in establishing contact with the hotels' French chefs, many of whom did not speak English. Because of the chefs' prestige and their being "the most strategically important sector in the hotel situation", their adherence to the strike was a major coup, for which Field got credit. For their part, the chefs insisted that Field be placed at the head of the new union. In this position he got much into the public eye and had his photo in the New York papers. His fame and prestige soared especially after a series of mass meetings, the biggest of which – at the annex of the Madison Square Garden – drew a crowd of no less than 10,000 people.

Thereafter, as Cannon put it, success went to Field's head and he became increasingly distant from the CLA, which he came to regard as "a marginal group of people at a small office on Sixteenth Street" while he was himself "the leader of a upsurging mass movement". The CLA criticized Field for neglecting the grassroots base of the strike, and placing excessive trust in the mediators sent by the National Labor Board and by New York Mayor La Guardia. However, Field refused altogether to meet with fellow activists or the CLA bodies and to discuss his way of conducting the hotel strike. Thereupon, the CLA decided to take the drastic step of expelling Field and his group of adherents, in the middle of the strike – rather than be held responsible for his policies without having a possibility of influencing them.

One of Field's most important collaborators in this strike was a young Greek-American, Aristodimos Kaldis, who would later have a career as a landscape artist. During the strike the CLA elements worked closely with a group of dissident Lovestoneites led by Benjamin Gitlow called the Workers Communist League. After being expelled the group around Field and Kaldis joined Gitlow's group, which now became the Organization Committee for a Revolutionary Workers Party. Though the membership of the group was small in the United States, it was more successful in Canada, taking the whole Montreal section and some of the Toronto branch members from the CLA in April of that year. Under the leadership of William Krehm they overshadowed the official Trotskyist movement in Canada by 1937.

The Gitlow group didn't stay long and by October 1934 had decided to enter the Socialist Party of America This left the Fieldites with few experienced Communist or labor leaders. The group then began negotiations for unity with a variety of other groups, including the Communist League of Struggle, the Revolutionary Workers League and a small group of Italian-American Bordigists. None of these was successful. In May 1936 the majority of the New York branch voted to rejoin the Trotskyists, but a minority stayed with Field in a reduced organization. According to one report, from a hostile source, when two members of the New York local F. L Demby and S. Stanley submitted a statement favoring dissociation from the LRWP during a meeting of the New York local Field had the door locked and he and his supporters physically attacked them. In any event a reported eight out of the groups twelve members left.

Among the associates of the league was a group of Columbia university students which included future philosopher Morton White, who was drawn to the group because it was harsher on the Soviet Union than Trotskyists. They had come to the conclusion that capitalism had already been restored in Stalinist Russia, and was no longer a degenerated workers state.

The LRWP was affiliated to the International Revolutionary Marxist Centre (often referred to as the London Bureau) with Field and Krehm attending the international association's Congress Against War, Fascism and Imperialism held in Brussels in 1936.

After being expelled from his own organization, Field dropped out of politics and joined former supporter Nat Mendelsohn's prosperous real estate firm in California. He died in 1977.

The exact date of the group's dissolution is uncertain, though a number of members rejoined the Trotskyist movement in the late 1930s. In April 1940 the remaining Fieldites published a special bulletin addressed to the convention of the Socialist Workers Party (United States), urging it to adopt its perspective on the USSR, which the Fieldites regarded as totalitarian rather than state capitalist. They believed "Russian question" was the most important issue facing the working class movement. They seem to have finally disbanded sometime later in 1940.

== Periodicals ==
The Fieldites published The Workers' Voice in Canada, Labor Front in the United States, a theoretical journal called Maitland – New International Bulletin, Workers Anti-War Bulletin and Revolutionary Youth, by the party's youth section. Bibliographer Walter Goldwater lists Labor Front as #128 in his index and gives its duration as Vol. I #1 June 1934 to Vol. VI #1 February 1939. The group also published an irregular "international" publication New International Bulletin: Documents of the New International which lasted from Vol. I #1 October 1935 – Vol. II #1 March 1937. Apparently this ceased publication when the majority of the New York group rejoined the Trotskyists.

== Prominent members & associates ==
- Paul Jacobs, founder of Mother Jones magazine
- Aristodimos Kaldis
- Morton White
- Albert Wohlstetter
- William Krehm, founder of the Committee on Monetary and Economic Reform (COMER) in Canada.

== Pamphlets ==
- Trotsky, Leon The only road New York, Pioneer Publishers 1933 (translated by Field and Max Shachtman, before the split)
- Field, B. J. Prospects of American Capitalism: Problems of the American Revolution, No. 1 New York City : Organization Pub. Co., 1935
- Davis, Edward Big Industry in Canada: A Marxian Survey [Toronto?] : League for a Revolutionary Workers' Party (Canadian section), 1937
- Krehm, William. Spain: revolution and counter-revolution [Toronto?] : League for a Revolutionary Workers' Party (Canadian section), 1930s
