= Jaime Manrique =

Colombian novelist, poet and educator (born 1949)

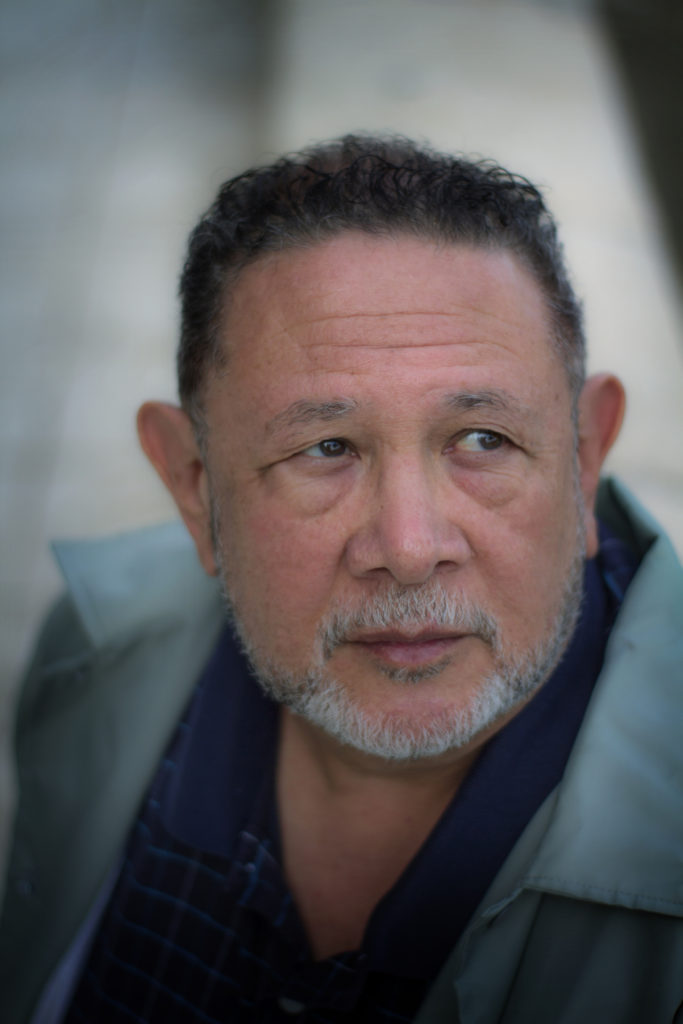
- Born: 16 June 1949 (age 77); Barranquilla, Colombia
- Education: University of South Florida (BA)
- Occupations: Novelist; poet; essayist; educator; translator

Jaime Manrique (born 16 June 1949) is a bilingual Colombian American novelist, poet, essayist, educator, and translator. His work is a representation of his cultural upbringing and heritage mixed with the flavors of his education in English. A primary distinction of his work comes from his bilingualism, and his choice to write in both English and Spanish. Many of his novels are published in English whereas his poetry is often printed and shared in Spanish. Manrique's writing covers a variety of themes and topics with some of his more notable works ranging from talking about his father's corpse and the adventures of a young gay Colombian immigrant. Therefore, Manrique's personal life and experiences can clearly be visualized in his writing and appreciated in his bilingual works.

== Background ==
Manrique was born in Barranquilla, Colombia. He lived his childhood between the city of his birth and Bogotá. In 1966, he emigrated with his mother to Lakeland, Florida. He received a B.A. in English literature at the University of South Florida in 1972.

In 1974, Manrique met Pauline Kael, The New Yorker's film critic, with whom he began a friendship that lasted until her death in 2001. His book Notas de Cine: Confesiones de un Crítico Amateur (1979), is dedicated to Kael.

In 1977, Manrique received permission from the Argentine novelist Manuel Puig to join a workshop that Puig taught at Columbia University. Manrique was working on El cadáver de papá (1980). Puig encouraged him to continue writing fiction when he said that he liked his writing because "it came from under the epidermis." They became friends after that. Manrique described their friendship in The Writer As Diva, an essay included in Eminent Maricones.

Also in 1977, Manrique met the American painter Bill Sullivan. The couple lived between Colombia and Venezuela until the end of 1979. Until Sullivan's death in 2010, they remained partners.

Jaime Manrique began his career as university professor in the US in 1987 at the Eugene Lang College of The New School for Social Research (The New School). His career as educator continues to this day.

== Writing career ==
His first poetry volume Los Adoradores de la Luna, won Colombia's National Poetry Award in 1975. His first novel published in English was Colombian Gold in 1983. In 1992 he published Latin Moon in Manhattan. About this novel James Dao wrote in The New York Times: "A picaresque tale about a gay Colombian immigrant's adventures among hookers, self-made millionaires, narcotics traffickers and elderly book mavens..." and also stated that "the novel is hardly intended to portray the "typical" immigrant experience."

In 1995, he published My Night with Federico García Lorca (Lambda Book Award Finalist), about which John Ashbery said, "Memories of an ecstatic childhood—walks by the sea, 'a happy mambo,' eating deceptive tropical fruits—merge with those of recent loves in these luscious, incantatory poems." The novel Twilight at the Equator appeared in 1997, of which Ilan Stavans said in The Washington Post: "He is, after all, the most accomplished gay Latino writer of his generation, a picaro prone to shock his readers by testing the moral standards of his time."

In 1999, he published Maricones Eminentes (Arenas, Lorca, Puig and Me) for which he received a Guggenheim Fellowship. About Maricones Eminentes Ilan Stavans said in The Washington Post that the book is "his sterling examination, through short narrative lives, of the gender wars in the Hispanic world. ...Posterity is a puzzle, of course. Whether this volume will last I cannot say, but that it should I have no doubt." And Susan Sontag said "A splendid memoir of Manuel Puig. It evokes him—how he really was—better than anything I've read." In 1999 he also The Foundation for Contemporary Arts Grants to Artist award. In 2006 he published Our lives are the Rivers about which the San Francisco Chronicle wrote "A compelling story that melds history and biography into the context of a passionate love affair, Our Lives Are the Rivers is a masterful piece of historical fiction." The novel received The International Latino Book Award (Best historical novel 2007).

In 2012 Manrique published Cervantes Street (Akashic Books, 2012). About the novel The Wall Street Journal said "Cervantes Street is exciting to read...Under Mr. Manrique's pen, the world of renaissance Spain and the Mediterranean is made vivid, its surface cracking with sudden violence and cruelty...This novel can be read as a generous salute across the centuries from one writer to another, as a sympathetic homage and recommendation... Cervantes Street brings to life the real world behind the fantastic exploits of the knight of La Mancha. The comic mishaps are funnier for being based in fact. The romantic adventures are more affecting. Cervantes Street has sent me back to Don Quixote." Junot Díaz said about the novel "A sprawling vivacious big-hearted novel. Manrique is fantastically talented". And Sandra Cisneros said "Cervantes Street, Jaime Manrique's magnificent novel, is a fabulous tale of the life of Miguel de Cervantes, an extraordinary portrait of a writer's life created from fact and imagination. I read it in bed over two or three days, never wanting the tale to end. Manrique is our Scheherazade."

Manrique novels, poemas and essays have been translated into English, Spanish, Hebrew, Polish, Turkish, Japanese, Chinese, German, Russian, Portuguese, Italian, Dutch, and other languages.

== Personal ideology ==
Jaime Manrique's bilingual background allows him to publish works in both English and Spanish. There is a distinguishing characteristic between Jaime Manrique's works in the two languages. The fictional works written by Jamie Manrique are published in English, and the poetry written by Manrique is published in Spanish. Jaime Manrique separates his writing in this way as writing in each individual language provides different contextual and emotional meaning. Manrique's works published in English tend to categorically fall into areas of a more public domain where the thoughts and ideas presented are meant to be more easily digestible and understood. However, unlike works written in English, Manrique's Spanish written works are in nature more personal and private language. Since Spanish is Jamie Manrique's native language, the thoughts shared in his shared Spanish poetry tend to portray deeper anecdotal values.

== Homosexuality ==
A significant detail of some writings by Jaime Manrique is the choice inclusion of themes of homosexuality and homoerotiscm. Within Jaime Manrique's poetry book, Los Adoradores de la Luna, there are visible expressions of homosexuality. These expressions of homosexuality and homoeroticism stem largely from the speaker of the poems being an androgynous person. The reason for this androgyny is in part due to the structure of the Spanish language. Because of the pronoun forms of the Spanish language, this allows the reader to interpret the sex of the speaker based on individual choice. A particular example of this effect in the poem collection, Los Adoradores de la Luna, is in the use of the words "te amaba" which could be perceived as spoken from a male or female since this form hold both the masculine and feminine parts of speech.

Another factor that attributes to the visibility of homosexuality and queer representation is through the embodiment of a metaphysical love. This abstract form of love takes shape in multiple ways within poems written by Manrique. Commonly, these states and figures share Manrique's views on the complexities of love and the emotions surrounding it. The love resembles how queer individuals of this time might feel whether the feelings are positive or negative. An example of this is in the poem, "Los lobos", which focuses on wolves as seen by the title. The wolves express tones of danger and darkness which portrays how Manrique seeks to share some enchanting features of love. However, the wolves serve as two toned symbols as they can be seen as guides through the darkness and function on the trust of the pack. As well, the use of wolves is not the only example of how Manrique writes of complex love in queer culture.

Although the poem collections are the primary example where homosexuality and homoerotiscm can be seen in Jaime Manrique's work. This does not exclude his novels as well. The diction and emotion are paralleled in his poetry and his books. However, there are some key differences in the way the material is presented. Manrique's work is a combination of his current culture and upbringing which shines through the Spanish poetry and English written texts uniquely. The ability of Manrique as author to write in both languages and also create unified and individualistic themes distinguishes his work.

== Teaching career ==
He has taught at The New School for Social Research, 1978-1980 (Writer in Residence); Mount Holyoke College, 1995 (Writer in Residence in the Spanish Department); Columbia University, 2002 – 2008 (Associate Professor in The MFA in Writing); Rutgers University, 2009 (Visiting Writer in the MFA Program in Writing); and The City College of New York, 2012 – to the present (Distinguished Lecturer in the Department of Classic and modern Languages and Literatures)

== Works ==
- Like This Afternoon Forever, 2019
- Como esta tarde para siempre, 2018
- El libro de los muertos, poemas selectos 1973-2015, 2016
- Cervantes Street, 2012
- Our Lives Are the Rivers, 2006
- The Autobiography of Bill Sullivan, 2006
- Tarzan My Body Christopher Columbus, 2001
- Eminent Maricones: Arenas, Lorca, Puig, and Me, 1999
- Mi cuerpo y otros poemas, 1999
- Twilight at the Equator, 1997
- Sor Juana's Love Poems, 1997
- My Night with Federico García Lorca, 1995
- Latin Moon in Manhattan, 1992
- Scarecrow, 1990
- Colombian Gold: A Novel of Power and Corruption, 1983
- El cadáver de papá, 1980
- Notas de cine: confesiones de un crítico amateur, 1979
- Los adoradores de la luna, 1977

== Prizes and awards ==
- 2019: Bill Whitehead Award for Lifetime Achievement for Like This Afternoon Forever

== See also ==
- LGBT culture in New York City
- List of Colombian writers
- List of LGBT writers
- List of LGBT people from New York City
- NYC Pride March

=== Bibliography ===
- Manrique, Jaime. "Jaime Manrique" (Interview). Interviewed by Grossman, Edith.
- Manrique, Jaime. "An Interview With Jaime Manrique" (Interview). Interviewed by Jackson, Jared.
- Machado, Alfonso Aldana; Sanjuan, Jessica Ivonne Atencia. "Analisis Hermeneutico De La Expresion Homoerotica En Los Adoradores De La Luna De Jaime Manrique". Universidad de Cartagena.
- Mier, Ariel Castillo. "El Carnaval a Cuestas De Jaime Manrique Ardila". Poligramas 31.
- Sandoval, Bolano. "Infierno, Tiempo e Historia: La Narrativa Purificatoria De Jaime Manrique Ardila". Colegio Americano.
- Sandoval, Adalberto Bolano. "Jaime Manrique Ardila: Entre El Paraíso Perdido y La Liberación De Los Deseos". Cuadernos de Literatura del Caribe e Hispanoamerica: 132–176. ISSN 1794-8290.
- Manrique, Jaime (1976). Volume 1 of Colección Casa de la cultura Latino literature: Los adoradores de la luna. Instituto de Cultura y Bellas Artes.

=== External links ===
- Official Website
