= United Shoe and Leather Workers' Union =

The United Shoe and Leather Workers' Union (USLWU) was a labor union representing shoe and bootmakers in the United States.

The union was founded in 1933, when the Shoe Workers' Protective Union (SWPU) merged with the National Shoe Workers' Association, the Shoe and Leather Workers' Industrial Union, and some local unions. However, a substantial minority of the SWPU objected to the merger and continued under the SWPU name.

The union was led by the Lovestoneite Israel Zimmerman. The main opposition force was aligned with the Communist Party USA, which unsuccessfully tried to have the union's whole executive recalled at the 1934 convention. However, in 1937, the Lovestoneites were defeated when, inspired by the formation of the Congress of Industrial Organizations, the USLWU merged with the St Louis branch of the SWPU, and some other local unions, to form the United Shoe Workers of America.
