= Aristodimos Kaldis =

Aristodimos Kaldis (August 15, 1899 in Dikeli, Ottoman Empire – May, 1979) was an artist and left-wing activist in New York.

Aristodimos Kaldis was influential in the gallery and museum scene during the 1950s. His friendship with leading members of the New York School dated from the 1930s. During the 1940s he supported himself by giving lectures on art and archaeology in a room at Carnegie Hall - with Willem de Kooning at the slide projector. These lectures were attended by large numbers of New York artists.

Also during the 1930s he participated with Communist League of America in organizing the 1934 New York Hotel Strike with B. J. Field and Ben Gitlow. When the union leadership under the latter accepted concessions that were not acceptable to the CLA leadership they were expelled and joined Gitlow's sect, the Workers Communist League, to form a new group called the League for a Revolutionary Workers Party.

Kaldis was also a painter, and since 1979, there have been numerous exhibitions of his work, including one in 1985 at the Artists' Choice Museum, which had the unique distinction of misnaming Phillip Pavia as Franz Kline in a picture of Kaldis and Pavia.
