= Alliance of Figurative Artists =

Artistic discussion group in 1970s New York City

The Alliance of Figurative Artists was an artist-run discussion group frequented by a majority of the figurative and realist painters and sculptors in New York City in the 1970s, including artists such as Alice Neel, Philip Pearlstein, Rackstraw Downes, Paul Georges, Lois Dodd, Gabriel Laderman, Richard Miller, Rosemarie Beck, Larry Faden, Sam Thurston, and Howard Kalish. It was held in New York City from February 14, 1969, until the 1980s. The first three meetings were held in artists' lofts and studios and thereafter at the Educational Alliance, 197 East Broadway, NYC. Although open to all without membership, it was intended as a forum for figurative and realistic painters and sculptors who felt isolated in an art world dominated by abstract and pop styles. The panels and individual speakers were usually artists. Bring work nights were also held. The organization was close to “anarchistic” (Tillim) and the discussions were often contentious to the point of driving people away. Philip Pearlstein noted “Between two and three hundred people showed up at these meetings. I started going there regularly. It was very exciting. All they wanted to do was to have panels and guest speakers, and just talk about the problems of figurative art representation, and the battles became terrific. It was mostly a split between the intellectuals and the expressionists; the ‘heads and the guts’”. The Artist's Choice Museum grew out of the Alliance.
