= History of American Trotskyism, 1928–38 =

1940s book by James P. Cannon

History of American Trotskyism, 1928–38: Report of a Participant is a biographical book written by the Communist James P. Cannon, founder and leader of the Socialist Workers Party. The book is based on twelve speeches given by Cannon in 1942 explaining about his expulsion from the Communist Party USA as a Trotskyist in 1928 and the efforts to build a new, non-Stalinist communist movement in the United States.
