= Artists' Choice Museum =

Defunct art gallery in New York City

Coordinates: 40°43′27.24″N 74°0′9.1″W

Artists’ Choice Museum in New York City was started in 1976 by many of the same younger artists who were active in the Alliance of Figurative Artists and the Figurative Coops. The first exhibition, a survey of 146 contemporary figurative artists was selected and organized by the artists of the Green Mountain, Bowery, Prince Street, and First Street Galleries - although it was a broad survey and did not exhibit just artists from those galleries. After the first show older artists were brought into its structure. Other group shows followed in clusters of galleries on 57th street and in museums: “Benefit Exhibit” in 1979 (40 artists), “Younger Artists: Benefit Exhibit” in 1980 (61 artists), “Intimate Visions” in 1982 (14 artists), “Narrative Sculpture” in 1982 (12 Artists), “Painted Light” in 1983 (90 artists) and “Bodies and Souls” in 1983 (156 artists) to name some. By 1980 The Museum was publishing a bimonthly newsletter and by 1982 a magazine. By 1984 the Museum finally had a home; a building on West Broadway. This space only lasted until 1986 when the organization ceased to exist.

== Artists’ Choice Museum Publications ==
- ACM Newsletter April 1980 to December 1981 (bimonthly)
- Journal of the Artists’ Choice Museum Spring 1982 to Winter 1986 (quarterly)
- Artists' Choice Museum Exhibition Catalogues
- Artists' Choice Museum Benefit Exhibition (1979)
- Artists’ Choice Museum Younger Artists: Benefit Exhibition (1980)
- Painted Light (Traveling Exhibition 1982–83)
- Narrative Sculpture (1982)
- Bodies and Souls (1983)
- The First Eight Years (1984)
- Richard McDermott Miller—The Nude in Bronze: Twenty Years of Sculpture (1984)
- Art and Friendship (15 Friends of Fairfield Porter) (1984)
- George McNeil—Expressionism 1954-1984 (1984)
- Paul Resika (1985)
- Aristodimos Kaldis (1985)
- Robert Barnes: Retrospective 1956-1984 (1985)
- The Figure in the Landscape (1985)
- Artists Choosing Artists (1985)
- Rueben Kadish: Survey 1935-1985 (1986)

== Foundation Members ==
Board of Artists: Paul Georges (chairman), William Bailey, Jack Beal, Joseph Giordano, Stephen Grillo, Howard Kalish, Marjorie Kramer, Tomar Levine, Richard Mc Dermott Miller, Donald Perlis, Marjorie Portnow, Paul Resika, Janet Schneider, Bill Sullivan, Sam Thurston.

Board of Trustees: Hans van den Houten ( chairman), Franz Skyranz, Steven W. Wolfe, Patricia J. Murphy, Ann Leven, and Janet Schneider.

Museum Director: Robert Godfrey

The whole idea was Paul Georges' but, as you know and has been stated, it was given the necessary spark by the 1976 exhibit organized by the co-op galleries. The boards were established in 1979, and in that year an inaugural exhibit featuring leading figurative artists was staged in six major New York Galleries. By then, the CCF ( Cultural Council Foundation of New York) had become the museum's fiscal manager and through the CCF the ACM began functioning as a tax-exempt, not-for-profit organization. In 1980 the Board of Regents of the State of New York granted Museum Status to the organization.

== The Manifesto ==
In the Spring of 1979 director Robert Godfrey and the Board of Artists drafted the first mission statement of the newly structured museum.

We are artists who have joined together to create a Museum which will be directed by artists. This effort is based on the belief that in viewing contemporary art, artists are the true “experts.” That it is their eyes which are the most knowing and sure in selection of works which deserve the public’s attention; that the core of the museum is not the building or administrative structure but the art it houses; and that the public deserves an unobstructed view through the vision of the artists to art they have created. We have been called figurative, representational, realist, genre, narrative and other labels. We are all these and more -- we do not accept these definitions as limitations. Rather, to assure the exposure of such art and others, we are structuring the Artists’ Choice Museum to reflect the interests and involvement of a broad range of artists and to attract the largest number of viewers and participants.To this end, the Artists’ Choice Museum will be a not-for-profit organization governed by a Board of Artists (serving self-limited terms) and with the aid and support of a Board of Trustees and two Advisory Boards. Our objectives include acquiring permanent space in New York City, mounting major Artists’ Choice exhibitions, assembling a permanent collection, organizing major shows by younger artists and touring travelling shows which have not received wide exposure. We take this responsibility with enthusiasm because art is now being made which as a strength and ambition greater than any of the individuals involved -- a cumulative force whose objectives are beyond the reach of the art world that now exists. Joining us in our endeavor are distinguished members of the business, financial and art communities. As founding members of the ARTISTS’ CHOICE MUSEUM, we welcome the support of fellow artists, patrons and the public in this significant and unique undertaking.

== Articles and Reviews 1976 to 1988 ==
- Ashbery, John. “Two Worlds and Their Way.” New York Magazine, Sept. 24, 1979.
- Bass, Ruth. “Artists’ Choose: Figurative/Realist Art, A Benefit Exhibition for the Artists’ Choice Museum.” Art News Magazine 78.10 (Dec. 1979).
- Berlind, Robert. “Recent Realism and the Artists’ Choice Museum.” Art Journal of the College Art Association 41.2 (Summer 1981): 176-180.
- Brenson, Michael. “Art: Expressionism and George McNeil at Artists’ Choice Museum.” The New York Times, Oct. 5, 1984.

--- "Aristodimos Kaldis at Artists’ Choice Museum.” The New York Times, Feb. 1, 1985.

- Crane, Diana. The Transformation of the Avant-Garde: The New York Art World, 1940-1985, The University of Chicago Press, 1987.
- de Kooning, Elaine. “A. Kaldis Remembered at Artists’ Choice Museum.” Art World, New York 9.4 Jan. 15-Feb. 15, 1985.
- Gallo, Hank. “Artists, Choice Museum: Nude in Bronze,” New York Daily News, April 25, 1984.
- Godfrey, Robert. “Have Museums Slighted Certain Types of Art, Particularly Figurative Art?” American Artist Magazine (Oct. 1979) 14.
- Haggerty, Gerard. “Art and Friendship--Artists’ Choice Museum.” Art News Magazine 83.9 (Nov. 1984).
- Harnett, Lila. “Realists’ Choice.” New York Cue Magazine, Sept. 22, 1979.
- Iovine, Julie. “Old Fashioned Art.” Connoisseur (April 1985).
- Kramer, Hilton. “Soho: Figures at an Exhibition.” The New York Times, Dec. 10, 1976.

--- “Six Gallery Show.” The New York Times, Sept. 14, 1979.

--- “Art: Five-Gallery Realist Show.” The New York Times, Sept. 12, 1980.

- Marzorati, Gerald . “Artful Dodger.” SoHo Weekly News, Aug. 2-8 1979.
- Muchnic, Suzanne. “Insurgent Artists Draw the Line.” Los Angeles Times, Jan. 2, 1980.
- Perreault, John. “New Museum? For Real? It Figures...” SoHo Weekly News, Sept. 20, 1979.
- Phillips, Deborah. “Artists’ Choice Museum Younger Artists.” Art News Magazine, Dec. 1980.
- Pieszak, Devonna. “Figurative Painting --Can it Rescue Art?” The New Art Examiner 7.2 (Nov. 1978) 1–9.
- Raynor, Vivian. “Painting; by 15 Friends of Fairfield Porter at Artists’ Choice Museum.” The New York Times, Aug. 3, 1984.
- Talmer, Jerry “Kitchen for the Realists.” New York Post, Aug. 25, 1979.
- Thornton, Gene. “Artists’ Choice: Figure.” Art World, New York 4.1 Sept. 22-Oct. 17, 1979.
