= Bertram Wolfe =

American scholar and left-wing activist (1896–1977)

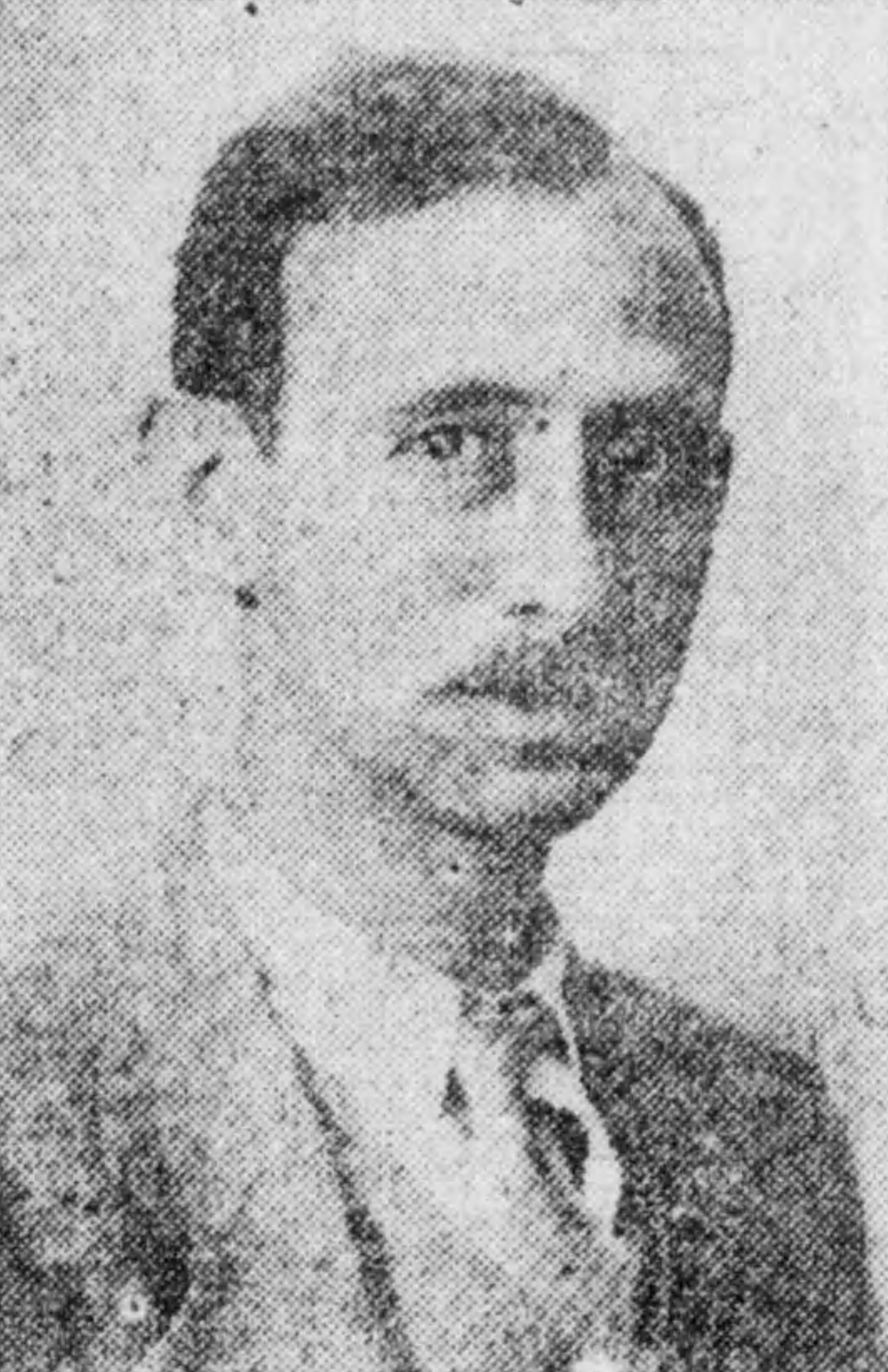
- Wolfe c. 1928
- Born: January 19, 1896; Brooklyn, New York, USA
- Died: February 21, 1977 (aged 81)
- Education: City College of New York; Columbia University; University of Mexico
- Spouse: Ella Wolfe (m. 1917)

Bertram David Wolfe (January 19, 1896 – February 21, 1977) was an American scholar, leading communist, and later a leading anti-communist. He authored many works related to communism, including biographical studies of Vladimir Lenin, Joseph Stalin, Leon Trotsky, and Diego Rivera. With his wife Ella Wolfe he cofounded the Communist Party of America in 1919, but later became disenchanted with communism and aligned himself with American political conservatism.

== Background ==
Bertram Wolfe was born January 19, 1896, in Brooklyn, New York. His mother was a native-born American and his father was an ethnic Jewish immigrant from Germany who had arrived in the United States as a boy of 13.

Wolfe studied to teach English literature and writing and received degrees from the College of the City of New York, Columbia University, and the University of Mexico.

== Career ==
=== Communist Party ===
Wolfe was active with the Socialist Party of America in his youth and was an active participant in the Left Wing Section which emerged in 1919. Wolfe attended the June 1919 National Conference of the Left Wing and was elected by that body to its nine-member National Council. He helped draft the manifesto of that organization, together with Louis C. Fraina and John Reed.

In 1919 Wolfe became a founding member of the Communist Party of America (CPA). Together with Maximilian Cohen, Wolfe was responsible for The Communist World, the CPA's first newspaper in New York City.

During the period of repression of leading Communists in New York conducted by the Lusk Committee, Wolfe fled to California. In 1920 he became a member of the San Francisco Cooks' Union. He also edited a left wing trade union paper called Labor Unity from 1920 to 1922. Wolfe was a delegate to the ill-fated August 1922 convention of the underground CPA held in Bridgman, Michigan, for which he was indicted under Michigan's "criminal syndicalism" law.

In 1923, Wolfe departed for Mexico, where he became active in the trade union movement there. He became a member of the Executive Committee of the Communist Party of Mexico and was a delegate of that organization to the 5th World Congress of the Communist International, held in Moscow in 1924. Wolfe was also a leading member of the Red International of Labor Unions (Profintern) from 1924 to 1928, sitting on that body's Executive Committee.

Wolfe was ultimately deported from Mexico to the United States in July 1925 for activities related to a strike of Mexican railway workers. Upon his return to America, Wolfe took over as head of the Party's New York Workers School, located at 26 Union Square and offering 70 courses in the social sciences to some 1500 students.

After his return to the United States, Wolfe became a close political associate of factional leader Jay Lovestone, who became the leader of the American Communist Party following the death of C.E. Ruthenberg in 1927. He was editor of The Communist, the official theoretical journal of the Communist Party, in 1927 and 1928.

Wolfe was chosen as a delegate of the American Communist Party to the Sixth World Congress of the Comintern in 1928.

In 1928, Wolfe was made the national director of agitation and propaganda for the Workers (Communist) Party of America. He also ran for U.S. Congress as a Communist in the 10th Congressional District of New York.

Late in December 1928, with the election campaign at an end, Wolfe was dispatched by the Lovestone-dominated Central Executive Committee of the American Communist Party to serve as it delegate to the Executive Committee of the Communist International (ECCI), where he replaced J. Louis Engdahl. In that capacity, he became involved in the attempt of Jay Lovestone to maintain control of the American organization over the growing opposition of Joseph Stalin and Vyacheslav Molotov, who ultimately supported the rival faction headed by William Z. Foster and Alexander Bittelman.

According to Benjamin Gitlow's 1940 memoir, I Confess, Wolfe was directed by the Comintern in April 1929 to be removed from his post in Moscow and to instead accept a dangerous assignment to Korea - at the time under Japanese rule - as part of the campaign against the Lovestone group in the American Communist Party. Wolfe refused the assignment, providing a long statement of his reasons to ECCI for this decision, according to Gitlow.

In June 1929, Wolfe was expelled from the Communist Party, USA for refusing to support the Comintern's decisions regarding the American Communist Party, which effectively removed Lovestone from power.

=== Communist Party (Opposition) ===
Upon returning to the United States, he and Lovestone, who had also been expelled from the party, formed the Communist Party (Opposition) to further their views. Having expected a majority of American Communists to join them, they were disappointed at only being able to attract a few hundred followers. Wolfe became editor of the CP(O)'s newspaper Worker's Age and its chief theorist. Initially, Lovestone and Wolfe hoped to eventually be welcomed back into the Communist movement but when changes in the Comintern's line failed to result in a rapprochement, the CP(O) moved further and further away from communism. Wolfe and Lovestone were sympathisers of Nikolai Bukharin and helped found the International Communist Opposition (also known as the International Right Opposition) which for a time had some influence before petering out.

In the 1930s, Wolfe and his wife, Ella Goldberg Wolfe, travelled around the world visiting Diego Rivera and Frida Kahlo in Mexico City in 1933 and spending time in Spain prior to the outbreak of the Spanish Civil War. By 1940, the Wolfes were living in Provincetown, Massachusetts where they befriended Alfred Kazin and introduced him to Mary McCarthy and the writers of the Partisan Review.

The CP(O) meanwhile moved further away from the left and went through several name changes finally becoming the Independent Labor League of America in 1938 before dissolving at the end of 1940 in part because of a break between Lovestone and Wolfe on their interpretation of World War II - with Lovestone favoring American intervention and Wolfe opposing support for what he argued was an imperialist war.

=== Cold War ===
Wolfe's political perspective changed with time, however, and during the Cold War was a leading anti-Communist. In the 1950s, he worked as ideological advisor to the State Department's International Broadcasting Office which was in charge of Voice of America. In his autobiography, "A Life in Two Centuries," Bertram wrote: "When I went to work for the Voice of America in the period from 1950 to 1954, religious leaders and believers were being framed, tortured, and sent to concentration camps in all the countries under Communist rule in Eastern Europe. After trying to get my script writers to write effective radio broadcasts to defend the religious freedom of the churchmen and devout believers who were being thus persecuted, I found that I had write the scripts myself to get the requisite feeling into them. I did not believe what the persecuted believe, but I did believe in their right to freedom to harbor and practice their beliefs without interference." He then joined Stanford University's Hoover Institution on War, Revolution and Peace's library as senior fellow in Slavic studies and, in 1966, became a senior research fellow at the institution. He also served as a visiting professor at Columbia University and the University of California. In 1973 Wolfe was one of the signers of the Humanist Manifesto II.

== Personal life and death ==
In 1917, Wolfe married Ella Goldberg (May 10, 1896 – January 8, 2000).

Wolfe died on February 21, 1977, from burns he suffered when his bathrobe caught fire. He was 81 years old at the time of his death.

== Works ==
- Our Heritage from 1776: A Working Class View of the First American Revolution. With Jay Lovestone and William F. Dunne, New York: The Workers School, n.d. [1926] alternate link
- How class collaboration works Chicago: Daily Worker, 1926 (Little red library #9)
- Revolution in Latin America New York: Workers Library Publishers, 1928
- The Trotsky opposition: its significance for American workers New York: Workers Library Publishers, 1928 (Workers library #5)
- Economics of present day capitalism New York: New Workers school 1930s
- The nature of capitalist crisis New York: New Workers school 1930s
- What is the communist opposition? New York: Workers Age Pub. Ass'n. 1933
- Marx and America New York: John Day Co. 1934
- Things We Want to Know New York: Workers Age Pub. Association. 1934
- Marxian Economics: An Outline of Twelve Lectures. New York: New Workers school 1934
- Economics of Present Day Capitalism. New York: New Workers School, n.d. [1930s].
- Portrait of America (with Diego Rivera) New York: Covici, Friede 1934
- Portrait of Mexico (with Diego Rivera) New York: Covici, Friede 1937
- Civil war in Spain (with Andrés Nin) New York: Workers Age Publishers 1937
- The Truth about the Barcelona events by Lambda (Introduction) New York: Workers Age 1937
- Keep America out of war, a program (with Norman Thomas) New York: Frederick A. Stokes 1939
- Diego Rivera: his life and times New York: A.A. Knopf 1939
- The Russian Revolution by Rosa Luxemburg Intro. and trans. by Bertram D. Wolfe. New York: Workers Age 1940
- Poland, acid test for a people's peace New York: Polish Labor Group 1945
- Diego Rivera Washington: Pan American Union 1947
- Three who made a revolution, a biographical history Washington: Dial Press 1948
- Operation rewrite; the agony of Soviet historians New York, N.Y.?: Council on Foreign Relations?, 1948
- An exclusive radio interview with Stalin on peace and war: based on a series of three broadcasts by the Voice of America, October, 1951(with Catharine de Bary) S.l. : Distributed by the United States Information Service, 1951
- Six keys to the Soviet system Boston: Beacon Press 1956
- Khrushchev and Stalin's ghost; text, background, and meaning of Khrushchev's secret report to the Twentieth Congress on the night of February 24-25, 1956. New York: Praeger 1957
- The durability of despotism in the Soviet system; Changes in Soviet Society, conference under the auspices of St. Anthony's College in association with the Congress for Cultural Freedom (June 24-29, 1957) Oxford: St. Anthony's College 1957
- The Russian Revolution, and Leninism or Marxism? by Rosa Luxemburg (new introduction) Ann Arbor: University of Michigan Press 1961
- The Fabulous Life of Diego Rivera (1963)
- Leninism Palo Alto, Calif.: Hoover Institution on War, Revolution, and Peace 1964
- Strange Communists I have known New York: Stein and Day 1965
- Marxism, one hundred years in the life of a doctrine New York, Dial Press 1965
- The bridge and the abyss; the troubled friendship of Maxim Gorky and V.I. Lenin New York, Published for the Hoover Institution on War, Revolution and Peace, Stanford University, Stanford, Calif. by F.A. Praeger 1967
- An ideology in power; reflections on the Russian revolution New York: Stein and Day 1969
- Lenin: notes for a biographer by Leon Trotsky (introduction) New York: Capricorn Books 1971
- Revolution and reality: essays on the origin and fate of the Soviet system Chapel Hill: University of North Carolina Press 1981
- A life in two centuries: an autobiography New York: Stein and Day 1981
- Lenin and the twentieth century: a Bertram D. Wolfe retrospective Stanford, Calif.:Hoover Institution Press, Stanford University 1984
- Breaking with communism: the intellectual odyssey of Bertram D. Wolfe edited and with an introduction by Robert Hessen Stanford, Calif.: Hoover Institution Press, Stanford University 1990

== See also ==
- Ella Goldberg Wolfe
- Benjamin Gitlow
- Jay Lovestone
- New York Workers School
- New Workers School
