= Paul Georges =

American painter (1923–2002)

- Born: Paul Gordon Georges; June 16, 1923; Portland, Multnomah County, Oregon, US
- Died: April 16, 2002 (aged 78); Isigny-sur-Mer, Lower Normandy, France
- Known for: Allegory, self-portraits

Paul Gordon Georges (June 15, 1923 – April 16, 2002) was an American painter. He painted large-scale figurative allegories and numerous self-portraits.

== Biography ==
In January 1966, the cover of Art News featured Georges' painting In The Studio, now in the collection of the Whitney Museum of American Art. Works were included in Whitney Museum Annuals of 1961, 1963, 1967 & 1969. Paintings by Georges are also in the collections of The Portland Art Museum, Oregon; Smart Museum University of Chicago; National Academy Museum, NYC; Rose Art Museum, Massachusetts; Weatherspoon Art Museum; Virginia Art Museum; Parrish Art Museum Southampton, Guild Hall Museum East Hampton and numerous others across America.

He was in 1976 the founder and until 1985 the chairman of the Artists' Choice Museum in New York City. He was a student of Fernande Leger in Paris 1949–52, and Hans Hofmann during 1947 in Provincetown with Larry Rivers, Wolf Kahn, Jane Freilicher and many other artists who became lifelong friends. He married Lisette Blumenfeld (daughter of photographer Erwin Blumenfeld) in 1950 after meeting at a party in Brâncuși's studio in the Passage Ronsin, Paris. They had two children Paulette Théodore of Marseille and Yvette Blumenfeld Georges Deeton of NYC who since 1989 Directs and manages Paul Georges Studio.

He died at his home at Isigny-sur-Mer, Normandy, France, aged 78.

== Education ==
- 1943 – Oregon State College
- 1943-45 – World War II Pacific Theater - awarded Purple Heart, Silver Star, Bronze Star, and more
- 1946-47 – University of Oregon at Eugene
- 1947 – Hans Hofmann School Provincetown, Mass. (summer)
- 1948 – solo exhibition at Reed College in Portland, Oregon
- 1949 – Académie de la Grande Chaumière
- 1949-52 – Atelier Fernand Léger
- 1952 – back in the USA he sold a painting by Alfred Sisley to help neighbor Mme. Mac Guffie a widow from France. Her husband was a dentist from Scotland who traded paintings from his customers who were Impressionist painters. Hansa Gallery cancelled his solo exhibition in 1954, but the exhibition was reviewed in Art News Magazine by Frank O'Hara. 'Selected by Clement Greenberg for 'Emerging Talent'' exhibition at the Kootz gallery in January 1954.
- 1955 – solo exhibition at the Tibor de Nagy Gallery in New York City.
- 1981 – elected to the National Academy of Design
