= Ella Wolfe =

American political activist (1896–2000)

- Born: Ella Goldberg; May 10, 1896; Kherson, Russia (present-day Ukraine)
- Died: 8 January 2000 (aged 103); Palo Alto, California, USA
- Education: Columbia University
- Known for: Co-founder of Communist Party USA
- Spouse: Bertram Wolfe (m. 1917; died 1977)

Ella Goldberg Wolfe (May 10, 1896 – January 8, 2000) was a Ukrainian-born American political activist and educator, who, with husband Bertram Wolfe, co-founded the Communist Party USA in 1919. She later became disenchanted with communism and aligned herself with American political conservatism and anti-communism.

== Background ==
Ella Goldberg was born on May 10, 1896, in Kherson, Ukraine and came to Williamsburg, Brooklyn with her parents in 1906.

== Career ==
Ella Goldberg Wolfe and Bertram Wolfe worked at the Rand School. After the passage of the Sedition Act of 1918, they were forced to go underground, living under assumed names. They lived for a time in Mexico City, where their circle of friends included Frida Kahlo and Diego Rivera. In 1929, they moved to Moscow but fell out with Stalin; they left two years later and returned to Brooklyn. Wolfe earned a degree in Spanish from Columbia University and went on to teach Spanish literature at Hunter College and in public schools in New York City.

After Stalin aligned himself with Hitler in 1939, Wolfe and her husband abandoned communism and became anti-communists. At the time, the couple found themselves hated by the left and distrusted by the political right.

In 1966, Wolfe moved to the Hoover Institution at Stanford University, where she spent her time editing her husband's papers and providing eyewitness accounts to researchers of the historic times in which she lived. Wolfe was consulted by researchers for the film "Reds".

== Personal life and death ==
In 1910, Goldberg met Bertram Wolfe. They married in 1917.

She became politically conservative and was a supporter of Ronald Reagan. She also became friends with Edward Teller, who was strongly anti-communist.

Ella Goldberg Wolfe died age 103 on January 8, 2000, at home in Palo Alto.
