= Herbert Zam =

American socialist activist and trade unionist (1900–1992)

Herbert Zam (October 21, 1900 – January 14, 1992) was an American socialist activist and trade unionist.

== Biography ==
Zam was born on the Lower East Side of Manhattan, and joined the Young People's Socialist League while in high school. Zam became a follower of Jay Lovestone, joining the Communist Party (Opposition) in 1929 after Lovestone's expulsion from the Communist Party. In 1935, Zam broke with the Lovestoneites and joined the Socialist Party.

Within the Socialist Party, Zam was a member of the Clarity faction, which opposed collaboration with the American Labor Party. He became the main editor of Socialist Review, the Party's official journal. In 1936, following discussions with members of the Communist Party, Zam helped to merge a Socialist union with a Communist supporting labor union, resulting in the creation of the United Office and Professional Workers Union. In the late 1930s, Zam left the Socialist Party. Zam later worked for the International Ladies Garment Workers Union, managing its Retirement Fund.
