= Shoe Workers' Protective Union =

Former American trade union

The Shoe Workers' Protective Union (SWPU) was a trade union representing workers involved in making footwear in the United States.

The union was founded in 1899, when the Boot and Shoe Workers' Union's Haverhill, Massachusetts branch split away. In 1917, it absorbed several small unions and thereafter opened admission to all workers in the industry. In 1924, it was joined by the United Shoe Workers of America union. Over the following years, it gradually absorbed the Amalgamated Shoe Workers of America union, one city at a time. By 1926, the union had 16,000 members.

In 1933, the union merged with the National Shoe Workers' Association, the Shoe and Leather Workers' Industrial Union, and some local unions, to form the United Shoe and Leather Workers' Union (USLWU). However, a substantial minority of the union disagreed with the merger and continued as the SWPU. In 1937, this merged with the USLWU, to form the United Shoe Workers of America.
