= United Shoe Workers of America =

Former American trade union

The United Shoe Workers of America (USWA) was a trade union representing workers involved in making shoes and other leather goods.

== History ==
The union was founded in 1937, when the United Shoe and Leather Workers' Union merged with the Shoe Workers' Protective Union. It was affiliated with the Congress of Industrial Organizations, and by 1953, it had around 60,000 members. In 1955, it transferred to the newly merged AFL–CIO.

The union's membership declined during the 1970s, in line with employment in the industry, and by 1979 was down to 25,000. It negotiated a merger with the independent Brotherhood of Shoe and Allied Craftsmen, the idea being that the resulting union would itself affiliate to the Retail Clerks International Union. However, the unions could not agree on how power would be distributed in the new shoe section. Instead, in 1979, it merged into the Amalgamated Clothing and Textile Workers' Union.

== Presidents ==
1937: Powers Hapgood
1939: Frank R. McGrath
1947: Raymond Swansen
1948: Rocco Francheschini
1949: William Thornton
1952: Russell J. Taylor
1956: George Fecteau
