= John L. Childs =

American educator (1899–1985)

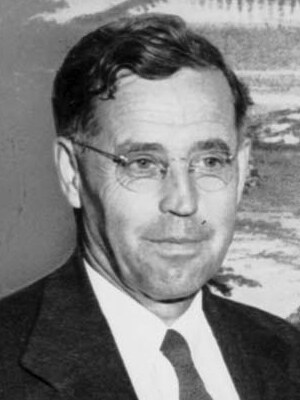
- Childs c. 1944
- Born: John Lawrence Childs; January 11, 1899; Eau Claire, Wisconsin, U.S.
- Died: January 31, 1985 (aged 86); Rockford, Illinois, U.S.
- Education: University of Wisconsin–Madison
- Occupations: Educator; Author
- Spouse: Grace Mary Fowler (m. 1915)

John Lawrence Childs (January 11, 1899 – January 31, 1985) was a 20th-century American educator, disciple of John Dewey, and author of The Educational Frontier who taught at Teachers College of Columbia University and took part in the progressive New York movement from the 1930s to the 1960s.

== Background ==
John Lawrence Childs was born in Eau Claire, Wisconsin. He graduated from the University of Wisconsin at Madison with a Journalism degree in 1911. He also began working with YMCA then.

== Career ==
From 1912 to 1915, Childs headed YMCA's Midwest chapter in Kankakee, Illinois. In 1916, he worked in Peking, China as a YMCA missionary. John Dewey stayed at Childs' home during his own visit to China. In 1922, Childs returned to the U.S.. In 1923, he began graduate studies at Union Theological Seminary (UTC): one of his professors at the Teachers College was W. H. Kilpatrick. In 1924, he went back to China. In 1927, he returned to States to study for a doctorate.

In 1931, Dr. Childs joined the faculty of Teachers College. In 1935, he became associate professor and, in 1938.

In 1935, Childs also joined the American Federation of Teachers (AFT) but in 1937 resigned due to rise in Communist influence. (His departure followed election of Jerome Davis, a colleague at UTC and in YMCA.)

In 1944, he was elected state chair of the Liberal Party of New York. On January 5, 1947, he resigned to give more time to his job as director of education at Columbia's Teachers College. At the time of his resignation, the Liberal Party of New York was expected to become the political agency of Americans for Democratic Action, whose formation was announced days before Child's resignation.

== Personal and death ==
In 1915, Childs married Grace Mary Fowler.

In 1985, he died at his home in Rockford, Illinois.

== Works ==
- Education and the Philosophy of Experimentalism (1931)
- America, Russia, and the Communist Party in the Postwar World with Georges Counts (1943)
- Education and Morals: An Experimentalist Philosophy of Education (1950)
- American Pragmatism and Education: An Interpretation and Criticism (1956)

== See also ==
- John Dewey
- Liberal Party of New York

== External sources ==
- Dennis, Lawrence (1992). From Prayer to Pragmatism: A Biography of John L. Childs. Carbondale and Edwardsville: Southern Illinois University Press.
- Dennis, Lawrence. "John L. Childs (1889-1985)". Education Encyclopedia.
- Teachers College Record
